= John Mitchel =

Irish writer (1815–1875)

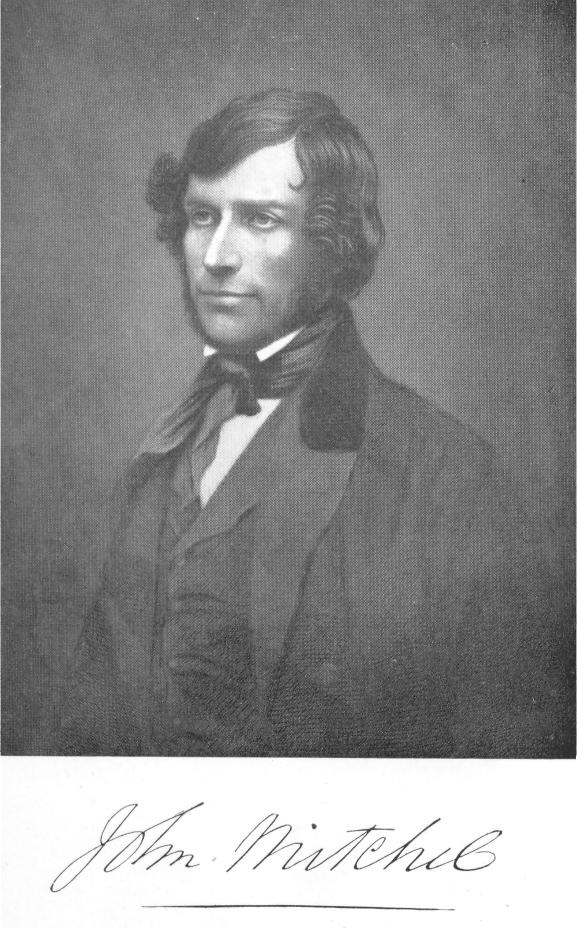
- Born: 3 November 1815; Camnish, County Londonderry, Ireland.
- Died: 20 March 1875 (aged 59); Newry, Ireland
- Occupations: Journalist; author
- Employers: The Nation (Dublin); The United Irishman (Dublin); Irish Citizen (New York City); Southern Citizen (Knoxville, Tennessee); Daily Enquirer (Richmond, Virginia); Richmond Examiner (Richmond, Virginia); New York Daily News
- Known for: Militant Irish republicanism and, in the United States, support for slavery and southern secession
- Movement: Young Ireland; Repeal Association; Irish Confederation; Fenian Brotherhood
- Spouse: Jane Verner (m. 1837)
- Relatives: William Irvine (nephew); John Purroy Mitchel (grandson)

John Mitchel (Irish: Seán Mistéal; 3 November 1815 – 20 March 1875) was an Irish republican writer and journalist chiefly renowned for his indictment of British policy in Ireland during the years of the Great Famine. Concluding that, in Ireland, legal and constitutional agitation was a "delusion", Mitchel broke first with Daniel O'Connell's Repeal Association and then with his Young Ireland colleagues at the paper The Nation. In 1848, as editor of his own journal, United Irishman, he was convicted of a treason felony and sentenced to 14-years penal transportation after advocating James Fintan Lalor's programme of co-ordinated resistance to landlords and to the continued shipment of harvests to England.

Controversially for a republican tradition that has viewed Mitchel, in the words of Pádraic Pearse, as a "fierce" and "sublime" apostle, in American exile into which he escaped in 1853 Mitchel was an uncompromising pro-slavery partisan of the Southern secessionist cause. Embracing the illiberal and racial views of Thomas Carlyle, he was also opposed in Europe to Jewish emancipation.

In his last year, 1875, and while still resident in the United States, Mitchel was elected twice to the British Parliament from County Tipperary on an abstentionist platform of Irish self-government, tenant rights and free education. Exposing, as he saw it, the "fraudulent" nature of Irish representation at Westminster, on both occasions the results were set aside on the grounds of his previous felony.

== Early life ==
Jenny Verner

John Mitchel was born at Camnish near Dungiven in County Londonderry, in the province of Ulster. His father, Rev. John Mitchel, was a Non-subscribing Presbyterian minister of Unitarian sympathies, and his mother was Mary (née Haslett) from Maghera. From 1823 until his death in 1840, John Sr. was minister in Newry, County Down. In Newry, Mitchel attended a school kept by a Dr David Henderson whose encouragement and support laid the foundation for classical scholarship that at age 15 gained him entry to Trinity College Dublin. After taking his degree at age 19 he worked briefly as a bank clerk in Derry, before entering legal practice in the office of a Newry solicitor, a friend of his father.

In early 1836 Mitchel met Jane "Jenny" Verner, the only daughter of Captain James Verner. Despite family opposition, they became engaged later in the year and were married in February 1837.

The couple's first child, John, was born in January the following year. Their second, James, (who was to be the father of the New York Mayor John Purroy Mitchel) was born in February 1840. Two further children were born, Henrietta in October 1842, and William in May 1844, in Banbridge, County Down, where as a qualified attorney Mitchel opened a new office for the Newry legal practice.

== Early politics ==
One of Mitchel's first steps into Irish politics was to face down threats of Orange Order retaliation by helping arrange, in September 1839, a public dinner in Newry for Daniel O'Connell. O'Connell was the leader of the campaign to repeal the 1800 Acts of Union and restore an Irish Parliament.

Until his marriage, John Mitchel had by and large taken his politics from his father who, according to Mitchel's early biographer William Dillon, had "begun to comprehend the degradation of his countrymen". Soon after the granting of Catholic emancipation in 1829, the O'Connellites challenged the Protestant Ascendancy in Newry by running a Catholic parliamentary candidate. Many members of the Rev. Mitchel's congregation took an active part in the elections on the side of the Ascendancy, and pressed the Rev. Mitchel to do the same. His refusal to do earned him the nickname "Papist Mitchel".

In Banbridge, Mitchel was often employed by the Catholics in the legal proceedings arising from provocative, sometimes violent, Orange incursions into their districts. Seeing how cases were handled by magistrates, who were themselves often Orangemen, enraged Mitchel's sense of justice and spurred his interest in national politics and reform.

In October 1842, his friend John Martin sent Mitchel the first copy of The Nation produced in Dublin by Charles Gavan Duffy, who had previously been editor of the O'Connellite journal, The Vindicator, in Belfast, and by Thomas Osborne Davis, and John Blake Dillon. Martin and Davis were both, like Mitchel himself, Protestants and graduates of Trinity College. "I think The Nation will do very well", he wrote Martin, while adding that he knew how the country "ought to take" news that an additional 20,000 troops were to be deployed to Ireland but would not put it on paper for fear of being arrested.

== The Nation ==
=== Succeeding Thomas Davis ===
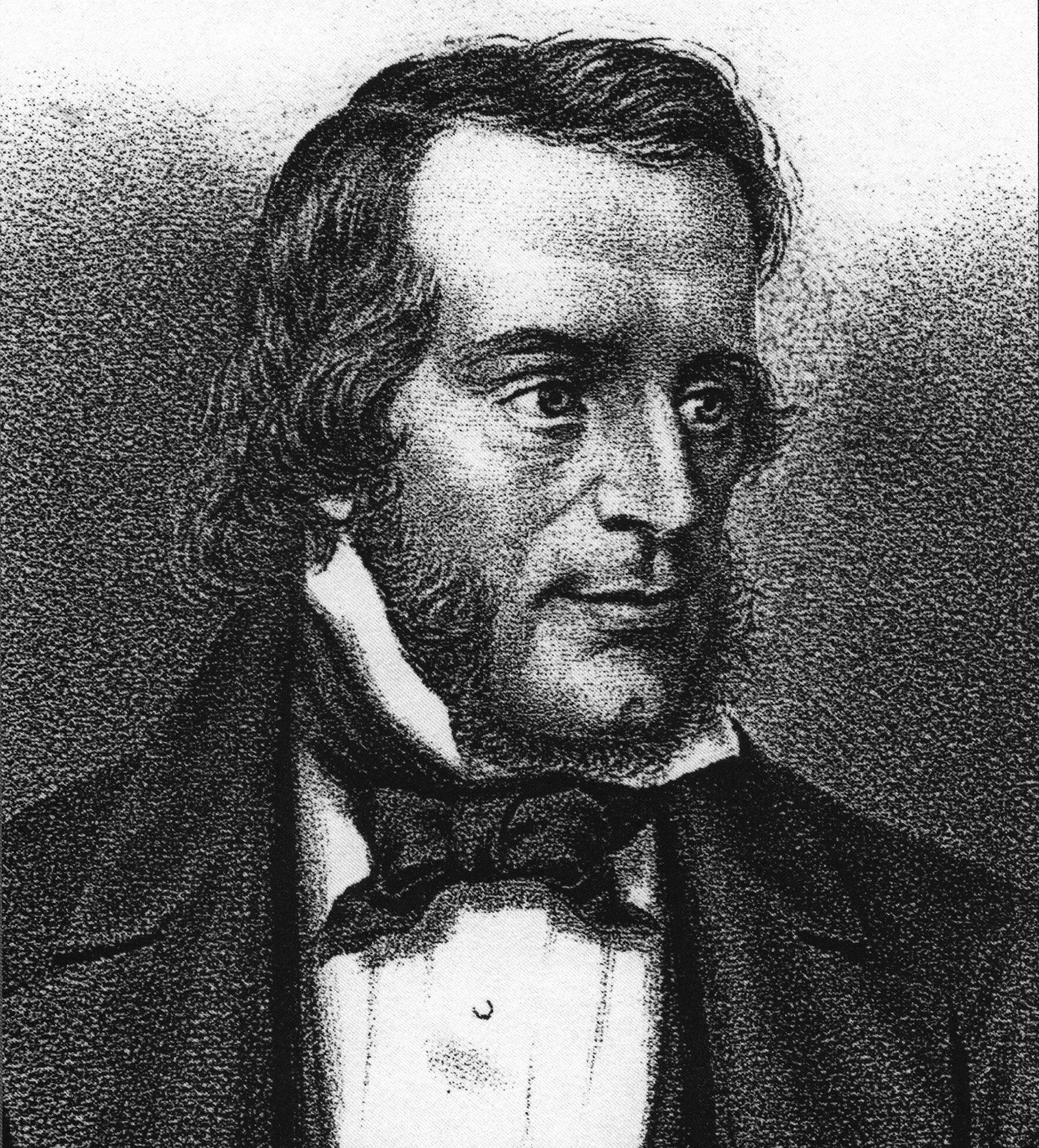
Thomas Davis

Mitchel began to write for the Nation in February 1843. He co-authored an editorial with Thomas Davis, "the Anti-Irish Catholics", in which he embraced Davis's promotion of the Irish language and of Gaelic tradition as a non-sectarian basis for a common Irish nationality. Mitchel, however, did not share Davis's anti-clericalism, declining to support Davis as he sought to reverse O'Connell's opposition to the government's secular, or as O'Connell proposed "Godless", Colleges Bill.

Mitchel insisted that the government, aware that it would cause dissension, had introduced their bill for non-religious higher education to divide the national movement. But he also argued that religion is integral to education; that "all subjects of human knowledge and speculation (except abstract science)—and history most of all—are necessarily regarded from either a Catholic or a Protestant point of view, and cannot be understood or conceived at all if looked at from either, or from both". For Mitchel a cultural nationalism based on Ireland's Gaelic heritage was intended not to displace the two religious traditions but rather serve as common ground between them.

When in September 1845, Davis unexpectedly died of scarlet fever, Duffy asked Mitchel to join The Nation as chief editorial writer. He left his legal practice in Newry, and brought his wife and children to live in Dublin, eventually settling in Rathmines. For the next two years Mitchel wrote both political and historical articles and reviews for The Nation. He reviewed the Speeches of John Philpot Curran, a pamphlet by Isaac Butt on The Protection of Home Industry, The Age of Pitt and Fox, and later on The Poets and Dramatists of Ireland, edited by Denis Florence MacCarthy (4 April 1846); The Industrial History of Free Nations, by Torrens McCullagh, and Father Meehan's The Confederation of Kilkenny (8 August 1846).

=== Response to the Famine ===
Mitchel blamed the British government for the famine. He wrote: "The Almighty, indeed, sent the potato blight, but the English created the Famine ... and a million and a half men, women and children were carefully, prudently and peacefully slain by the English government".

On 25 October 1845, in an article entitled "The People's Food", Mitchel pointed to the failure of the potato crop, and warned landlords that pursuing their tenants for rents would force them to sell their other crops and starve. On 8 November, in "The Detectives", he wrote, "The people are beginning to fear that the Irish Government is merely a machinery for their destruction; ... that it is unable, or unwilling, to take a single step for the prevention of famine, for the encouragement of manufactures, or providing fields of industry, and is only active in promoting, by high premiums and bounties, the horrible manufacture of crimes!".

On 14 February 1846 Mitchel wrote again of the consequences of the previous autumn's potato crop losses, condemning the Government's inadequate response, and questioning whether it recognised that millions of people in Ireland who would soon have nothing to eat. On 28 February, he observed that the Coercion Bill, then going through the House of Lords, was "the only kind of legislation for Ireland that is sure to meet with no obstruction in that House". However they may differ about feeding the Irish people, the one thing all English parties were agreed upon was "the policy of taxing, prosecuting and ruining them".

In an article on "English Rule" on 7 March 1846, Mitchel wrote:

The Irish People are expecting famine day by day ... and they ascribe it unanimously, not so much to the rule of heaven as to the greedy and cruel policy of England. ... They behold their own wretched food melting in rottenness off the face of the earth, and they see heavy-laden ships, freighted with the yellow corn their own hands have sown and reaped, spreading all sail for England; they see it and with every grain of that corn goes a heavy curse.

=== Lalor and the break with O'Connell ===
James Fintan Lalor

In June 1846 the Whigs, with whom O'Connell had worked against the Conservative ministry of Robert Peel, returned to office under Lord John Russell. Invoking new laissez-faire doctrines of political economy, they immediately set about dismantling Peel's limited, but practical, efforts to provide Ireland with food relief. O'Connell was left to plead for his country from the floor of the House of Commons: "She is in your hands—in your power. If you do not save her, she cannot save herself. One-fourth of her population will perish unless Parliament comes to their relief". A broken man, on the advice of his doctors O'Connell took himself to the continent where, en route to Rome, he died in May 1847.

In the months before O'Connell's death, Duffy circulated letters received from James Fintan Lalor in which he argued that independence could be pursued only in a popular struggle for the land. While Lalor proposed that this should begin with a campaign to withhold rent, he suggested more might be required. Parts of the country were already in a state of semi-insurrection. Tenants conspirators, in the tradition of the Whiteboys and Ribbonmen, were attacking process servers, intimidating land agents, and resisting evictions. Lalor advised only against a general uprising, as he believed the Irish people could not overthrow British rule in Ireland with military force.

Having abandoned the hopes he had entertained with Duffy that landlords might rally to Repeal, and notwithstanding that his own ideas of agrarian reform extended little further than Tenant Right, Mitchel embraced Lalor's vision of agrarian agitation as the cutting edge of a national struggle. When the London Standard observed that the new Irish railways could be used to transport government troops to quickly curb agrarian unrest, Mitchel responded that the tracks could be turned into pikes and trains ambushed. O'Connell publicly distanced himself from The Nation, appearing to some to set up Duffy, as the editor, for prosecution. In the case that followed, Mitchel successfully defended Duffy in court. O'Connell and his son John were determined to press the issue. On the threat of their own resignations, they carried a resolution in the Repeal Association declaring that under no circumstances was a nation justified in asserting its liberties by force of arms.

The grouping around the Nation that O'Connell had taken to calling "Young Ireland", a reference to Giuseppe Mazzini's anti-clerical and insurrectionist Young Italy, withdrew from the Repeal Association. In January 1847, they formed themselves anew as the Irish Confederation with, in Michael Doheny words, the "independence of the Irish nation" the objective and "no means to attain that end abjured, save such as were inconsistent with honour, morality and reason". But unable to secure a pronouncement in favour of Lalor's policy of building a campaign of resistance around tenant grievances, Mitchel soon broke with his confederates.

== Admiration for Carlyle, and opposition to black and Jewish emancipation ==
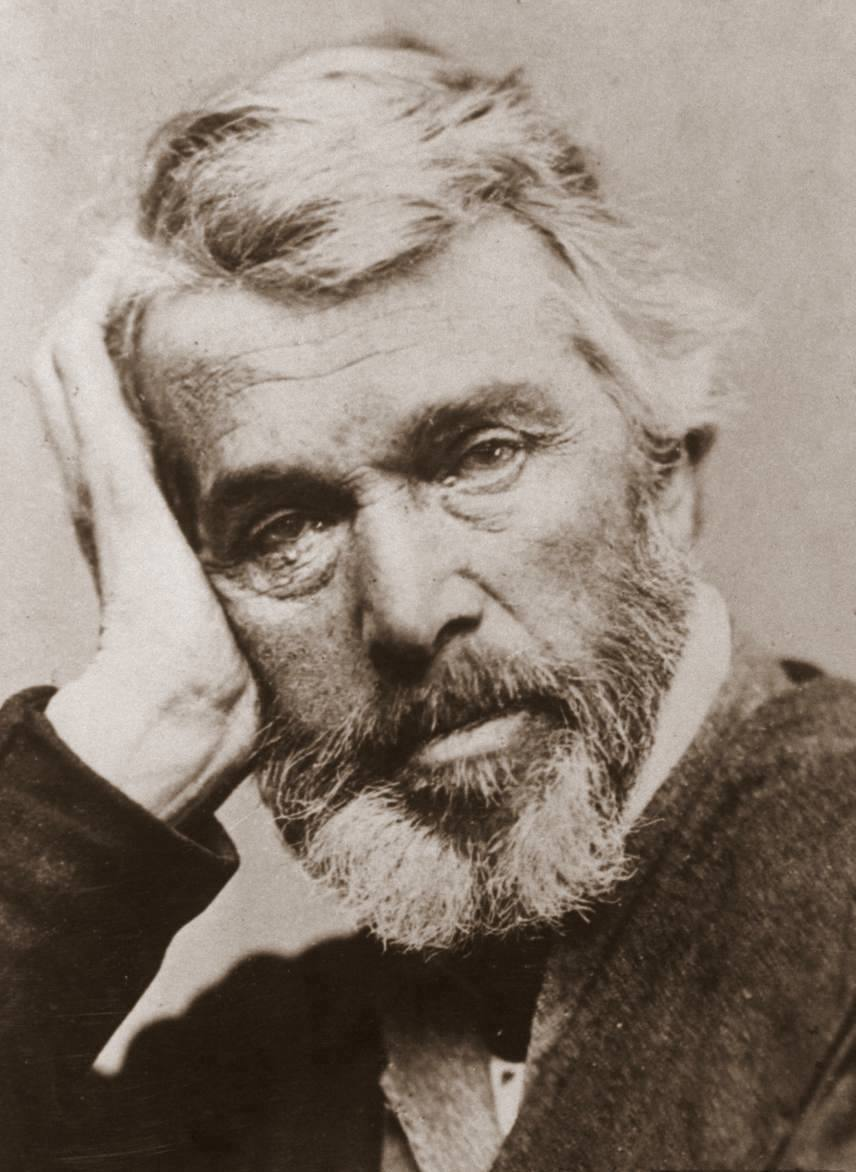
Thomas Carlyle

Duffy suggests that Mitchel had already been on a path that would see him break not only with O'Connell but also with Duffy himself and other Young Irelanders. Mitchel had fallen under the influence of Scottish essayist, historian and philosopher Thomas Carlyle, a High Tory notorious for his antipathy toward liberal notions of enlightenment and progress.

In the Nation of 10 January 1846, Mitchel reviewed Oliver Cromwell's Letters and Speeches (1845), a book by Carlyle that had been publicly condemned by O'Connell only two weeks prior. Despite Mitchel himself waxing indignant at Oliver Cromwell's conduct in Ireland, Carlyle was pleased: he believed Mitchel had conceded Cromwell's essential greatness. Mitchel had just published his own hagiography of the Ulster rebel chieftain Hugh O'Neill, which both Duffy and Davis had found excessively "Carlylean". Mitchel's book was a success: "an early incursion of Carlylean thought into the romantic construction of the Irish nation that was to dominate militant Irish politics for a century". It embraced views which Carlyle had espoused in On Heroes, Hero-Worship, & the Heroic in History (1841) and denounced British rule in Ireland, perceiving it to be suppressing Irish culture "in the name of Civilisation".

When in May 1846 Mitchel first met Carlyle in a delegation with Duffy in London, he wrote to John Martin describing the historian's presence as "royal, almost Godlike", and did so even while acknowledging Carlyle's unbending unionism. Hosted by Mitchel in September 1846 in Dublin, Carlyle recalled "a fine elastic-spirited young fellow" but upon whom Carlyle's own arguments "were thrown away". This might have been true with regard to the value of the union. But when Carlyle drew derogatory comparisons (as other commentators had done) between Irish cottiers and the allegedly-indolent descendants of enslaved Afro-Caribbeans, Mitchel's response was not to join O'Connell in proclaiming himself "the friend of liberty in every clime, class and colour". Rather, it was to insist on a racial distinction between the Irish and the "negro". This Duffy had discovered in 1847 when he conceded temporary editorship of The Nation to Mitchel.

Duffy found that he had lent a journal, "recognised throughout the world as the mouthpiece of Irish rights", to "the monstrous task of applauding negro slavery and of denouncing the emancipation of the Jews", another of O'Connell's liberal causes against which Mitchel stood with Carlyle. It was not only that Mitchel claimed (as others had done) that Irish cottiers were treated worse than black slaves. Nor was it that Mitchel decried as inopportune O'Connell's harping upon "the vile union" in the United States "of republicanism and slavery". Duffy himself was fearful of the impact of O'Connell's vocal abolitionism upon American support and funding. It was that Mitchel argued (with Carlyle) that slavery was "the best state of existence for the negro".

According to Duffy, when he confronted Carlyle with Mitchel's overt racism, Carlyle responded that Mitchel "would be found to be right in the end; the black man could not be emancipated from the laws of nature, which had pronounced a very decided decree on the question, and neither could the Jew".

== The United Irishman ==
John Mitchel c. 1848

At the end of 1847 Mitchel resigned his position as leader writer on The Nation. He later explained that he had come to regard as "absolutely necessary a more vigorous policy against the English Government than that which William Smith O'Brien, Charles Gavan Duffy and other Young Ireland leaders were willing to pursue". He "had watched the progress of the famine policy of the Government, and could see nothing in it but a machinery, deliberately devised, and skilfully worked, for the entire subjugation of the island—the slaughter of a portion of the people, and the pauperization of the rest", and he had therefore "come to the conclusion that the whole system ought to be met with resistance at every point".

He was convinced too, that rendered acute by the famine, the agrarian question had the potential to surmount the north-south sectarian division, and to realise the unity that had been sought in 1798. As "An Ulsterman for Ireland", he ridiculed the Orangeism of the landed Ascendancy, reminding "the farmers, labourers and artisans of the north of Ireland" that:

My Lord Enniskillen ... is apprehensive not lest you be evicted by landlords, and sent to the poorhouse, but lest purgatory and the Seven Sacraments be down your throats. ... The Seven Sacraments are, to be sure, very dangerous, but the quarter-acre-clause [conditioning access to poor relief] touches you more nearly ... [B]end all your energies to resisting the "encroachments of Popery" you thereby perpetuate British dominion in Ireland and keep the "Empire" going yet a little while. Irish landlordism has made a covenant with British government in these terms—"Keep down for me my tenantry, my peasantry, my 'masses' in due submission with your troops and laws, and I will garrison the island for you and hold it as your liege-man and vassal for ever."

While decrying the "fatal cant of moral force", and admitting no principle that distinguished his position from the "conspirators of Ninety-Eight" (the original United Irishmen), Mitchel emphasised that he was not recommending "an immediate insurrection": in the "present broken and divided condition" of the country "the people would be butchered". With Fintan Lalor he urged "passive resistance". The people should "obstruct and render impossible the transport and shipment of Irish provisions" and, by intimidation, suppress bidding for grain or cattle if brought "to auction under distress"—a method that had demonstrated its effectiveness in the Tithe War. Such actions would be illegal, but such was his opposition to British rule that in Mitchel's view, no opinion in Ireland was "worth a farthing which is not illegal".

The first number of Mitchel's own paper, United Irishman, appeared on 12 February 1848. The Prospectus announced that as editor Mitchel would be "aided by Thomas Devin Reilly, John Martin of Loughorne and other competent contributors" who were likewise convinced that "Ireland really and truly wants to be freed from English dominion". No other object defined their purpose: if he was a republican now, Mitchel privately confessed that it was "only because this spirit democratic spirit is the most formidable enemy to British dominion in Ireland". He was "no bigot as to forms of government".

Under a masthead that included Wolfe Tone's caution that "if the men of property" failed in their allegiance to the national cause, it could yet triumph with "the aid of that numerous and respectable class of the community, the men of no property", The United Irishman declared:

That the Irish people had a distinct and indefeasible right to their country, and to all the moral and material wealth and resources thereof, ... as a distinct Sovereign State ...;

That the property of the farmers and labourers of Ireland is as sacred as the property of all the noblemen and gentlemen in Ireland, and also immeasurably more valuable;

That the custom called 'Tenant Right,' which prevails partially in the North of Ireland, is a just and salutary custom both for North and South ...;

That every man in Ireland who shall hereafter pay taxes for the support of the State, shall have a just right to an equal voice with every other man in the government ...

That all 'legal and constitutional agitation' in Ireland is a delusion;

That every freeman, and every man who desired to become free, ought to have arms, and to practise the use of them.

That no combination of classes in Ireland is desirable, just, or possible, save on the terms of the rights of the industrious classes being acknowledged and secured; [and]

That no good thing can come from the English Parliament, or the English Government.

In the first editorial, addressed to "The Right Hon. the Earl of Clarendon, Englishman, calling himself Her Majesty's Lord Lieutenant – General and General Governor of Ireland", Mitchel stated that the purpose of the journal was to resume the struggle which had been waged by Tone and Emmet, the Holy War to sweep this Island clear of the English name and nation." Lord Clarendon was also addressed as "Her Majesty's Executioner-General and General Butcher of Ireland".

Commenting on this first edition of The United Irishman, Lord Stanley in the House of Lords, on 24 February 1848, maintained that the paper pursued "the purpose of exciting sedition and rebellion among her Majesty's subjects in Ireland ..., and to promote civil war for the purpose of exterminating every Englishman in Ireland". He allowed that the publishers were "honest" men: "they are not the kind of men who make their patriotism the means of barter for place or pension. They are not to be bought off by the Government of the day for a colonial place, or by a snug situation in the customs or excise. No; they honestly repudiate this course; they are rebels at heart, and they are rebels avowed, who are in earnest in what they say and propose to do".

Only 16 editions of The United Irishman had been produced when Mitchel was arrested, and the paper suppressed. Mitchel concluded his last article in The United Irishman, from Newgate prison, entitled "A Letter to Farmers",

[My] gallant Confederates ... have marched past my prison windows to let me know that there are ten thousand fighting men in Dublin—'felons' in heart and soul. I thank God for it. The game is afoot, at last. The liberty of Ireland may come sooner or come later, by peaceful negotiation or bloody conflict—but it is sure; and wherever between the poles I may chance to be, I will hear the crash of the down fall of the thrice-accursed British Empire.

== Arrest and deportation ==
On 15 April 1848, a grand jury was called on to indict not only Mitchel, but also his former associates on the Nation O'Brien and Thomas Francis Meagher for "seditious libels". When the cases against O'Brien and Meagher fell through, thanks in part to Isaac Butt's able defence, under new legislation the government replaced the charges against Mitchel with treason felony, punishable by transportation for life. To justify the severity of the new measures, under which Mitchel was arrested in May, the Home Secretary thought it sufficient to read extracts from Mitchel's articles and speeches.

Convicted in June by a jury he dismissed as "packed" (as "not empanelled even according to the law of England"), Mitchel was sentenced to be "transported beyond the seas for the term of fourteen years". From the dock he declared that he was satisfied that he had "shown what the law is made of in Ireland", and that he regretted nothing: "the course which I have opened is only commenced". Others would follow.

Accommodated as a gentleman rather than as a common criminal, Mitchel was carried aboard the sloop HMS Scourge to Ireland Island in the "Imperial fortress" of Bermuda. After a year of acute ill health aboard the prison hulk HMS Dromedary, he was re-embarked for the Cape Colony on the Nautilus. Once the Nautilus reached the Cape it was refused docking or supply during the convict crisis of 1849 and remained anchored off the coast for five months before sailing on to the penal colony of Van Diemen's Land (modern-day Tasmania, Australia) to which O'Brien, Martin, Meagher, and other Young Irelanders, had been transported in the wake of their abortive July 1848 rising.

Aboard ship, he began writing his Jail Journal, in which he reiterated his call for national unity and resistance. Accepting a ticket of leave in Tasmania, he and Martin lived together at Bothwell, in a house still known as Mitchel's Cottage. His wife and children joined him in Bothwell in June 1851. In August, they move onto a two hundred-acre farm which they worked with convict labour. While he admitted to "living as peacefully as they ever did in Banbridge", after Meagher broke his parole in January 1852 and reached New York, Mitchel determined to join him.

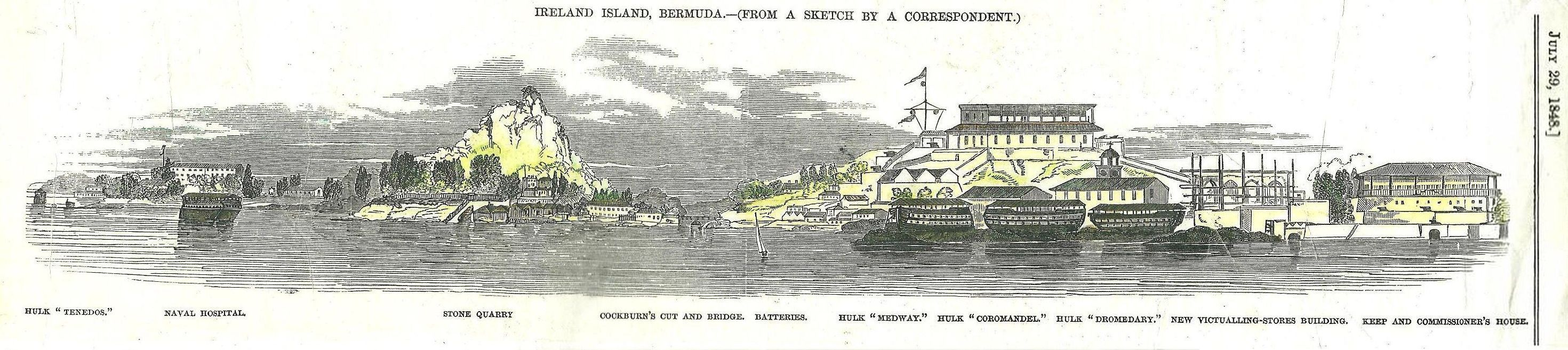
An 1848 woodcut of HMD Bermuda, Ireland Island, Bermuda.

== United States ==
Assisted by Patrick James ("Nicaragua") Smyth, an agent of the New York Irish Directory, in June 1853 Mitchel escaped from Van Diemen's Land and made his way (via Tahiti, San Francisco, Nicaragua and Cuba) to New York City. He soon outlived the hero's welcome he received. Among his contributions to the Irish Citizen (a joint venture with Meagher) was a defence of slavery in the southern states that occasioned "much surprise and general rebuke".

=== Pro-slavery Confederate ===
Once in the United States, Mitchel did not hesitate to repeat the claim that negroes were "an innately inferior people". In what was only the second edition the Irish Citizen, he declared that it was not a crime "or even a peccadillo to hold slaves, to buy slaves, to keep slaves to their work by flogging or other needful correction", and that he himself, might wish for "a good plantation well-stocked with healthy negroes in Alabama". Subject to widely-circulated broadsides from the abolitionist Henry Ward Beecher and the French republican exile Alexandre Holinski, the remarks triggered a public furore. In Dublin, the Irish Confederation convened an emergency meeting to protest reports in American and British press outlets which "erroneously attributed" Mitchel's proslavery thought "to the Young Ireland party".

Provoked by the nativist hostility they encountered in the United States, Mitchel was to further distance his countrymen from African Americans by elevating them within the white race. In 1858 he told an audience in New York that "nearly all the great men which Europe has produced have been Celts".

In correspondence with his friend, the Roman Catholic priest John Kenyon, Mitchel revealed his wish to make the people of the US "proud and fond of [slavery] as a national institution, and [to] advocate its extension by re-opening the trade in Negroes". Slavery he promoted for "its own sake". It was "good in itself" for "to enslave [Africans] is impossible or to set them free either. They are born and bred slaves". The Catholic Church might condemn the "enslavement of men", but this censure could not apply to "negro slaves".

The value and virtue of slavery, "both for negroes and white men", Mitchel maintained from 1857 in the pages of the Southern Citizen, a paper he moved in 1859 from Knoxville, Tennessee to Washington D.C. The paper circulated widely through Hibernian societies of the south. Among these it was commonplace to propose that the American slave had nothing to envy in the freedom of the Irish tenant-at-will, the cottier family in Ireland that the landlord might set out in the roadside ditch. In 1854, in a widely reported address to the graduating class of University of Virginia, he had linked Britain's abolitionism to her laissez-faire indifference to the Irish famine. He had also credited slavery with the contrast between southern gentility and Yankee brusqueness.

Mitchel's wife, Jenny, had her reservations. Nothing, she said, would induce her "to become the mistress of a slave household". Her objection to slavery was "the injury it does to the white masters". There is no record or suggestion of Mitchel, himself, holding any person in bondage. When he briefly farmed in eastern Tennessee it was from a log cabin and, reportedly, with a "colored man" employed only "if he could not get a white man to work".

While championing the South, in the summer of 1859 Mitchel detected the possibility of a breach between France and England, from which Ireland might benefit. He travelled to Paris as an American correspondent, but found the talk of war had been much exaggerated. After the secession from the American Union of several Southern states in February 1861 and the bombardment of Fort Sumter (during which his son John commanded a South Carolina battery), Mitchel was anxious to return. He reached New York in September and made his way to the Confederate capital, Richmond, Virginia. There he edited the Daily Enquirer, the semi-official organ of secessionists' president, Jefferson Davis.

Mitchel drew a parallel between the American South and Ireland: both were agricultural economies tied to an unjust union. The Union States and England were "the commercial, manufacturing and money-broking power ... greedy, grabbing, griping and grovelling". Abraham Lincoln he described as "an ignoramus and a boor; not an apostle at all; no grand reformer, not so much as an abolitionist, except by accident – a man of very small account in every way".

The Mitchels lost both their youngest son Willie in the Battle of Gettysburg in July 1863, and their son John, who returned to Fort Sumter, in July the following year.

After the reverse at Gettysburg, Mitchel became increasingly disillusioned with Davis's leadership. In December 1863 he resigned from the Enquirer and became the leader writer for the Richmond Examiner, regularly attacking Davis for what he saw as misplaced chivalry, especially his failure to retaliate in kind for Federal attacks on civilians.

On slavery, Mitchel remained uncompromising. As the South's manpower reserves depleted, Generals Robert E. Lee and Patrick Cleburne (a native of County Cork) proposed that slaves should be offered their freedom in return for military service. Although he had been among the first to claim that slavery had not been the cause of the conflict but simply the pretext for northern aggression, Mitchel objected: to allow blacks their freedom was to concede that the South had been in the wrong from the start. His biographer Anthony Russell notes that it was "with no trace of irony at all", that Mitchel wrote:

... if freedom be a reward for negroes – that is, if freedom be a good thing for negroes – why, then it is, and always was, a grievous wrong and crime to hold them in slavery at all. If it be true that the state of slavery keeps these people depressed below the condition to which they could develop their nature, their intelligence, and their capacity for enjoyment, and what we call "progress" then every hour of their bondage for generations is a black stain upon the white race.

This might have suggested that Mitchel was open to revising his view of slavery. But he remained defiant to the end, going so far as to "raise the blasphemous doubt" as to whether General Robert E. Lee was "a 'good Southerner'; that is whether he is thoroughly satisfied of the justice and beneficence of negro slavery".

Mitchel would make no allowances. After the war a Union officer who claimed to have "loved John Mitchel, the Irish patriot, with a purer devotion" than any in Ireland, reported to a Boston paper that, as prisoners in Richmond, he and a fellow Irishman contacted his former idol. Not only did Mitchel refuse to have anything to do with "Lincoln's hirelings", but in the next issue of the Examiner he "directed the citizens to treat this human fungi not as prisoners of war, but as 'robbers, murderers and assassins!'"

Frederick Douglass, who in visiting Ireland believed her dispossessed were bound in sorrow at their circumstances with the enslaved in America, accounted Mitchel a "vulgar traitor to liberty". For his part, Mitchell would admit no contradiction between championing Irish freedom and justifying the enslavement of Africans. If asked whether he would like "an Irish Republic with an accompaniment of slave plantations", he suggested he would answer "Yes, very much".

=== At odds with Irish America ===
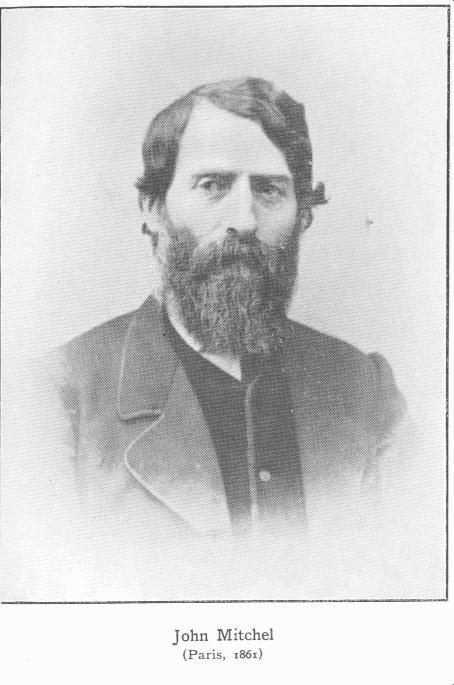
John Mitchel, Paris, 1861

At war's end in 1865 Mitchel moved to New York and edited the New York Daily News. That same year, his continued defence of southern secession caused him to be arrested in the offices of the paper and interned at Fort Monroe, Virginia, where Jefferson Davis and Senator Clement Claiborne Clay (accused of conspiracy to assassinate Lincoln) were the only other prisoners. A new Irish republican organisation, the Fenian Brotherhood, lobbied for his release which was secured on condition that he left America. Mitchel returned to Paris where he acted as Fenians' financial agent.

Following their raids into Ontario and New Brunswick in June 1866, opposing Fenian factions proposed to unite under Mitchel's leadership. But Mitchel objected to asking people for large contributions under the delusion that, with England at peace, further military operations could be mounted whether in Canada or in Ireland. He resigned from the Brotherhood, and returned to New York where, after writing for the Daily News, he resumed publication of the Irish Citizen.

Mitchel's anti-Reconstruction, pro-Democratic editorial line was opposed in New York by another Ulster Protestant, the IRB exile David Bell. Bell's "Journal of Liberty, Literature, and Social Progress", Irish Republic, cautioned readers "interested in the labor question" from associating themselves with John Mitchel. Mitchel, a "miserable man", was the proponent of a "diabolical" Democratic Party plan to impose upon blacks in the South, "as a substitute for chattel slavery, a system of serfdom scarcely less hateful than the institution it is intended to practically prolong". The policy was nothing less than "an attempt to attach to the laborer in America those medieval conditions which even Russia has rejected", referring to the emancipation of the serfs in 1861.

The revived Citizen failed to attract readers and folded in July 1872; Bell's Irish Republic followed a year later. Neither paper was in sympathy with the ethnic-minority Catholicism powerfully represented by the city's Tammany Hall Democratic Party political machine and, until his death in 1864, by the authority of a third Ulsterman, Archbishop John Hughes. Mitchel dedicated his paper to "aspirants to the privileges of American citizenship", arguing that the more integrated (or "more lost") among American citizens the Irish in America were "the better".

Already In 1854, for comments critical of the Pope's temporal powers, Mitchel had earned "wrath" of the Archbishop. But, like Mitchel, Hughes had suggested that the conditions of "starving laborers" in the North were often worse than that of slaves in the South, and in 1842 he had urged his flock not to sign O'Connell's abolitionist petition ("An Address of the People of Ireland to their Countrymen and Countrywomen in America") which he regarded as unnecessarily provocative. Nonetheless, Hughes used Mitchel's stance on slavery to discredit him: as Mitchel saw it, "copying the abolition press to cast an Alabama plantation" in his "teeth".

== Final campaign: Tipperary elections ==
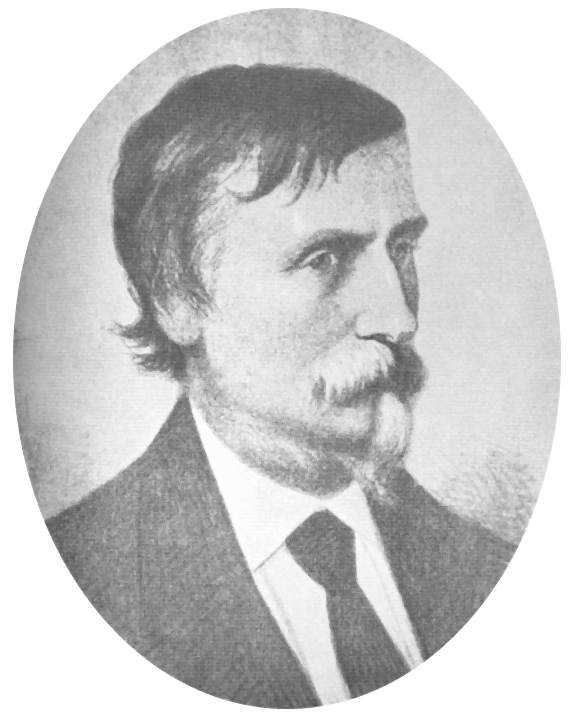
John Mitchel, last portrait 1875

In July 1874 Mitchel received an enthusiastic reception in Ireland (a procession of ten thousand people escorted him to his hotel in Cork). The Freeman’s Journal opined that: "After the lapse of a quarter of a century – after the loss of two of his sons ... John Mitchel again treads his native land, a prematurely aged, enfeebled man. Whatever the opinions as to the wisdom of his course ... none can deny the respect due to honest of purpose and fearlessness of heart".

Back in New York City on 8 December 1874, Mitchel lectured on "Ireland Revisited" at the Cooper Institute, an event organised by the Clan-na-Gael and attended by among other prominent nationalists Jeremiah O'Donovan Rossa. While his visit to Ireland was ostensibly private, Mitchel revealed that he had been pressed to stand for British Parliament and that it was his intention, if any vacancy should occur, to offer himself as a candidate so that he might "get the Irish members to put in operation the plan suggested by O’Connell at one time, of declining to attend in Parliament altogether, that is, to try to discredit and explode the fraudulent pretence of representation in the Parliament of Britain". In the same speech, Mitchel dismissed the Irish Home Rule movement: "the fact that this Home Rule League [his friend John Martin among them] goes to Parliament and sets it hope therein, puts me in indignation against the Home Rule League ... they are not Home Rulers but Foreign Rulers. Now it is painful for me to say even so much in disparagement of so excellent a body of men as they are ... after a little while they will be bought".

The call from Ireland came sooner than expected. In January 1875 a by-election was called for a parliamentary seat in County Tipperary. Stung by his remarks in New York, the Irish Parliamentary Party was reluctant to endorse Mitchel's nomination, although they may have been confused as to his position. Before re-embarking for Ireland, Mitchel issued an election address in which he declared for Home Rule—but, straddling positions, defining this as "sovereign independence for Ireland"—together with free education, universal tenant rights, and the freeing of Fenian prisoners. As it was, on 17 February, while still approaching the Irish shore, Mitchel was elected unopposed. As had been the case for O'Donovan Rossa who had been returned for very same constituency in 1869, his election was unavailing. On the motion of Benjamin Disraeli, the House of Commons by a large majority declared Mitchel, as a felon, ineligible. Mitchel ran again as an Independent Nationalist in the resulting March by-election, and in a contest took 80 percent of the vote.

== Death and commemoration ==
Mitchel died at Drumalane, his parents' house in Newry, on 20 March 1875. His last letter, published on St. Patrick's Day, 17 March 1875, expressed his gratitude to the voters of Tipperary for supporting him in exposing the 'fraudulent' system of Irish representation in Parliament. An election petition had been lodged. Observing that voters in Tipperary had known that Mitchel was ineligible, the courts awarded the seat to Mitchel's Conservative opponent.

Mitchel was survived, in the United States, by his wife and his son James (father of John Purroy Mitchel who was to be a reform-minded mayor of New York City). At Mitchel's funeral in Newry, his friend John Martin collapsed, and died a week later (he was succeeded as MP for County Meath by Charles Stewart Parnell).

On the day Mitchel died, the Tipperary paper The Nenagh Guardian offered "An American View of John Mitchel": a syndicated piece from the Chicago Tribune that declared Mitchel a "recreant to liberty", a defender of slavery and secession with whom "the Union masses of the American people" could have "little sympathy". Obituaries for Mitchel looked elsewhere to qualify their acknowledgement of his patriotic devotion.

The Home-Rule Freeman’s Journal wrote of Mitchel: "we may lament his persistence in certain lines of action which his intelligence must have suggested to him could have but been futile issue ... his love for Ireland may have been imprudent. But he loved her with a devotion unexcelled". The Standard, with which Mitchel had contended in 1847, concluded: "His powers through life, however, were marred by want of judgment, obstinate opinionativeness [sic], and a factiousness which disabled him from ever acting long enough with any set of men".

Pádraic Pearse placed Mitchel in succession to Theobald Wolfe Tone, Thomas Davis, and James Fintan Lalor and hailed Mitchel's "gospel of Irish nationalism" as the "fiercest and most sublime". Sinn Féin leader Arthur Griffith was adamant that it detracted nothing from Mitchel's greatness that he severed "the case for Irish independence from theories of humanitarianism and universalism". No excuse was needed "for an Irish Nationalist declining to hold the negro his peer in right".

Comparing him to Thomas Davis, W. B. Yeats concluded that a "harsh Ulster character, made hasher still by the tragedy of the famine, and the rhetoric of Carlyle" had a political influence that was "almost wholly mischievous". Mitchel "played upon international suspicion and exalted hatred of England above the love of Ireland that Davis would have taught us".

In the decades following his death, branches of the Irish National Land League were named in Mitchel's honour. There are at least ten Gaelic Athletic Association clubs named after Mitchel, including one based in his home town, Newry and two in County Londonderry, his county of birth – one in Claudy and another in Glenullin. Mitchel Park is named after him in Dungiven, near his birthplace, as is Mitchell County, Iowa, in the United States. Fort Mitchel on Spike Island, Cork, from which he was transported in 1848, is named in his honour.

During the movement to remove statues following the 2020 murder of George Floyd in the United States, a petition receiving over 1,200 signatures called for the statue in John Mitchel Place, Newry, to be removed and the site renamed "Black Lives Matter Plaza". Newry, Mourne and Down District Council agreed only to "proceed to clarify responsibility for the John Mitchel statue, develop options for an education programme, identify the origins of John Mitchel Place and give consideration as to other potential issues in relation to slavery within the council area".

Mitchel's recent biographer, Anthony Russell, argues that Mitchel's stand on slavery was not an aberration. His rejection of philanthropic liberalism was equal to his disdain for "free labour" political economy. In his Jail Journal Mitchel urged capital punishment for crimes such as burglary, forgery and robbery. The "reformation of offenders" was not, he argued, "the reasonable object of criminal punishment": "Why hang them, hang them ... you have no right to make the honest people support the rogues ... and for 'ventilation' ... I would ventilate the rascals in front of the county jails at the end of a rope".

As for slavery in the American South, in his biography William Dillon proposes that for Mitchel it was a "practical issue". Faced with the alternative of a social system of the North in which the relation of master to servant was regulated by competition, "He took his stand in favour of the system that seemed to him the better of the two; and as was his habit, he took it decisively".

Mitchel is remembered for his involvement in radical nationalism, and in particular for writings such as Jail Journal, The Last Conquest of Ireland (Perhaps), The History of Ireland, An Apology for the British Government in Ireland, and the less well known The Life and times of Hugh O'Neill. He was described by Charles Gavan Duffy as "a trumpet to awake the slothful to the call of duty; and the Irish people".

== Books by John Mitchel ==
- The Life and Times of Hugh O'Neill, James Duffy, 1845
- 1641: A Reply to the Falsification of History by James Anthony Froude, Entitled 'The English in Ireland', Cameron & Ferguson, Glasgow, 1847?.
- Jail Journal, or, Five Years in British Prisons, Office of the "Citizen", New York, 1854
- Poems of James Clarence Mangan (Introduction), P. M. Haverty, New York, 1859
- An Apology for the British Government in Ireland, Irish National Publishing Association, 1860
- The History of Ireland, from the Treaty of Limerick to the Present Time, Cameron & Ferguson, Glasgow, 1864
- The Poems of Thomas Davis (Introduction), D. & J. Sadlier & Co., New York, 1866
- The Last Conquest of Ireland (Perhaps), Lynch, Cole & Meehan 1873 (originally appeared in the Southern Citizen, 1858)
- The Crusade of the Period, Lynch, Cole & Meehan 1873
- Mitchel, John (1917), MacNeill, Eoin (ed.), An Ulsterman for Ireland: being letters to the Protestant farmers, labourers and artisans of the north of Ireland (1st ed.), Dublin: The Candle Press, Wikidata Q113950397

Parliament of the United Kingdom
Preceded by Charles William White; William O'Callaghan	Member of Parliament for County Tipperary; 1875; Served alongside: William O'Callaghan	Succeeded by Stephen Moore; William O'Callaghan
