= 1870 County Tipperary by-election =

UK Parliamentary by-election

The 1870 County Tipperary by-election was fought on 28 February 1870. The by-election was fought due to the disqualification (convicted felon) of the incumbent Independent Nationalist MP, Jeremiah O'Donovan Rossa. It was won by the Liberal candidate Denis Caulfield Heron.
