= William Frederick Ormonde O'Callaghan =

Irish politician (1852–1877)

William O'Callaghan

Member of Parliament for County Tipperary
- In office 14 February 1874 – 20 April 1877 Serving with: Stephen Moore; John Mitchel; Charles William White
- Preceded by: Denis Caulfield Heron; Charles William White
- Succeeded by: Stephen Moore; Edmund Dwyer Gray

Personal details
- Born: 14 November 1852
- Died: 20 April 1877 (aged 24)
- Party: Home Rule

The Hon. William Frederick Ormonde O'Callaghan (14 November 1852 – 20 April 1877) was an Irish Home Rule League politician.

Born in London, he was the second son of George O'Callaghan, 2nd Viscount Lismore and his wife, Mary Norbury. He was educated at Eton.

He was elected one of two Member of Parliaments (MPs) for County Tipperary in 1874, but died in 1877 before completing a full term.

He died at his home in London after a week's illness. He was buried at Kensal Green Cemetery.

Parliament of the United Kingdom
Preceded by Denis Caulfield Heron; Charles William White	Member of Parliament for County Tipperary; 1874–1877; With: Stephen Moore (1875–1877); John Mitchel (1875–1875); Charles William White (1874–1875)	Succeeded by Stephen Moore; Edmund Dwyer Gray
