= February 1875 County Tipperary by-election =

UK parliamentary by-election

The February 1875 County Tipperary by-election took place on 16 February 1875. The by-election, to one of two seats in the UK House of Commons constituency of County Tipperary, arose due to the resignation of the incumbent MP, Charles William White of the Home Rule League.

Immediately on news of White's resignation, there was speculation that John Mitchel, the Fenian campaigner, would be a candidate. Mitchel had been convicted of treason in 1848 on the basis of writings which were considered seditious, and sentenced to transportation for 14 years. Sent to Bermuda, he had escaped in 1853 to the United States. On 3 February, he announced that he would sail for Ireland, and issued an election address to the electors of Tipperary, saying he was in favour of Home Rule, total overthrow of the established Church, free education, universal tenant rights, and the freeing of Fenian prisoners. This met with a mixed reception; the Irishman newspaper announced that 'By electing John Mitchel, Tipperary will prove to our rulers that Ireland is neither dead nor dying.' The Daily Express on the other hand insisted that as he was a felon who had broken his parole, his election would be regarded as 'a defiance to England and an incentive to disaffection'.

Mitchel's candidacy raised mixed feelings on the Nationalist side. It was reported that the Nation, a pro-Home Rule paper, which Mitchel had written for years before, while accepting that he would be elected, was uneasy with his radicalism. It was clear that Mitchel's election was likely and that it would very probably be uncontested - another Fenian, Jeremiah O'Donovan Rossa, had been elected for the constituency in a by-election in 1869, only for his election to be invalidated as he was a felon. Charles Kickham, the prominent Fenian writer, told the voters that it was unlikely the British government would render Mitchel's election void, but rather would seek support for a candidate of their own, hoping to get the Roman Catholic clergy to advise against electing Mitchel.

On 16 February 1875, no other nominations having been received, John Mitchel was declared elected, unopposed, as Member of Parliament for Tipperary. The next day, the House of Commons directed that a new writ be issued, as Mitchel was disqualified as an undischarged felon.
