= Patrick James Smyth =

Irish politician and journalist

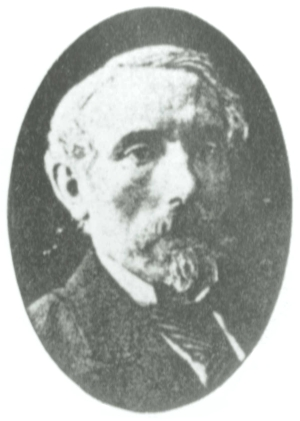
- Smyth, c. 1880s

Member of Parliament
- In office 1871–1880
- Preceded by: William Pollard-Urquhart and Algernon Greville
- Succeeded by: Timothy Daniel Sullivan and Henry Joseph Gill
- Constituency: County Westmeath
- In office 1885 – January 1885
- Preceded by: Stephen Moore and Edmund Dwyer Gray
- Succeeded by: John O'Connor and Thomas Mayne
- Constituency: Tipperary

Personal details
- Born: 1823/1826 Waterford, Ireland
- Died: 12 January 1885 15 Belgrave Square East, Rathmines, Dublin, Ireland
- Resting place: Glasnevin cemetery, Dublin, Ireland
- Party: Home Government Association; Home Rule League; Irish Parliamentary Party
- Awards: Legion of Honour (Chevalier)

Patrick James Smyth (Irish name O'Gowan or Mac Gabhainn; 1823/1826 – 12 January 1885), also known as Nicaragua Smyth, was an Irish politician and journalist. A Young Irelander in 1848, and subsequently a journalist in American exile, from 1871 he was an Irish Home Rule Member of the United Kingdom Parliament for County Westmeath and from 1880 for County Tipperary.

== Biography ==
Smyth was born in Dublin in either 1823 or 1826, the son of James Smyth, of County Cavan, by Anne, daughter of Maurice Bruton of Portane, County Meath. His father was a tanner in Dublin. Smyth was educated at Clongowes Wood College where he became friends with Thomas Francis Meagher, with whom he joined Daniel O'Connell's Repeal Association in 1844, which sought to repeal the Act of Union between the United Kingdom and Ireland which had, amongst other things, ended the autonomous Parliament of Ireland.

=== Young Ireland ===
Smyth left the Repeal Association when the Young Irelanders seceded from the organisation to go their own way in July 1846. Smyth was named a member of the council of the Irish Confederation on its foundation in January 1847. During the Young Irelander Rebellion of 1848, Smyth was assigned by William Smith O'Brien to organise insurrections in counties Dublin, Meath, and Louth, but his effort was for nought as the rebellion was generally a disaster.

=== Exile ===
Following his involvement in the Young Irelander Rebellion, Smyth fled to New York City alongside John Blake Dillon. Smyth would take up work as a journalist, becoming political editor of the Irish Advocate in 1850 as well as becoming involved in the New York Irish Directory.

Upon the death of his father Smyth inherited considerable property and wealth. Smyth used this newfound fortune to fund a daring plan: To rescue fellow Young Irelander John Mitchel from Van Diemen's Land (now Tasmania), where the British had banished him to for his part in the rebellion. Smyth funded the chartering of a ship and sailed on it personally in June 1853. Not only did Symth successfully break Mitchel out of Van Diemen's Land, but Symth also met and married local woman Jeannie Regan during his time there. Smyth's role in Mitchel's escape brought him fame and made him a hero in Irish-American circles, who held numerous banquets in his honour.

=== Return to Ireland ===
Smyth returned to Ireland in 1856, where he settled in Dublin and began studying the law. He was qualified as a barrister by 1858 but after just a short stint in the profession seemed to lose interest in it. In 1860 he became the owner and operator of the Irishman, a newspaper. Under Smyth's guidance, the paper adopted a pro-Union stance upon the outbreak of the American Civil War and criticised British support for the CSA.

In September 1865 British authorities in Ireland suppressed and arrested anyone associated with the Irish People, a newspaper with strong links to the Irish Republican Brotherhood, and Smyth fled Ireland for a time fearing a similar fate. By the late 1860s, following the failure of the Fenian Rising of 1867, Smyth had lost faith in the belief of Irish Independence by violent rebellion. Nonetheless, he continued to support Irish Nationalists. He attempted to rally support for the Manchester martyrs, who in 1867 was arrested and charged with murdering a British police officer when they rescued Irish Republican Brotherhood leaders Thomas J. Kelly and Timothy Deasy from imprisonment in England. Smyth even offered to represent them in the court, although the offer was turned down.

=== Electoral Politics ===
Smyth stood for election to the British Parliament as an independent nationalist candidate for Wexford in 1870, and lost by just 8 votes. Following the outbreak of the Franco-Prussian War that same year, Smyth helped organise an Irish ambulance unit for the French army. Smyth also suggested to the French government that they should form an Irish brigade, given how many Irish veterans of the American Civil War were available. In recognition of this effort on behalf of France during the war, Smyth was made chevalier of the Légion d'honneur in 1871.

Smyth was a founding member of Isaac Butt's Home Government Association in May 1870 and was elected under their banner as a Member of Parliament (MP) for County Westmeath at a by-election on 17 June 1871, and was reelected in 1874. At the 1880 general election, he did not seek re-election in Westmeath, but stood instead in County Tipperary, where he was elected unopposed. During his time as an MP Smyth is described as having been "an entertaining, if not always effective, orator". Over time Smyth became disenchanted with Butt's approach of simply seeking home rule for Ireland and began to advocate for outright repeal of the Act of Union. In early 1874 Smyth formed the ’82 clubs, a breakaway movement from the Home Rule League (established in November 1873 as a successor to the Home Government Association), to agitate for repeal. The '82 clubs enjoyed the support of the Irish Republican Brotherhood but failed to make much headway outside of the Dublin area. In June 1876 Smyth decried home rule as a "vile conspiracy against the life of the Irish nation". In the 1880 general election Smyth stood in Tipperary on behalf of the Irish Parliamentary Party and won, however Smyth became uneasy within the party upon the election of Charles Stewart Parnell as chairman in May 1880. Smyth disliked what he viewed as Parnell's autocratic style and, as the Land war intensified, he denounced the Land League as the ‘League of Hell’. By January 1881 he formally seceded from the party, which resulted in the party mounting a vigorous campaign to force him to resign his seat. In late 1881 Michael Davitt described Smyth as "Our Irish National Don Quixote; eccentric, rhetorical and most thoroughly impracticable". He left the House of Commons at the end of 1884, when he was appointed as Secretary to the Irish Loan Fund Board. This made Smyth the last Irish MP who had been elected as a nationalist to accept a place in government, and it further eroded Smyth's popularity.

Smyth died only weeks after his appointment, on 12 January 1885, at his home at 15 Belgrave Square East, Rathmines, Dublin, and was buried in Glasnevin cemetery.

== Notes ==
Parliament of the United Kingdom
Preceded by William Pollard-Urquhart; Algernon Greville	Member of Parliament for County Westmeath; 1871 – 1880; With: Algernon Greville 1871–1874; Lord Robert Montagu 1874–1880	Succeeded by Timothy Daniel Sullivan; Henry Joseph Gill
Preceded by Stephen Moore; Edmund Dwyer Gray	Member of Parliament for County Tipperary; 1880 – January 1885; With: John Dillon to 1883; Thomas Mayne from 1883	Succeeded by John O'Connor; Thomas Mayne
