= Daniel O'Donoghue (Irish politician) =

Irish politician

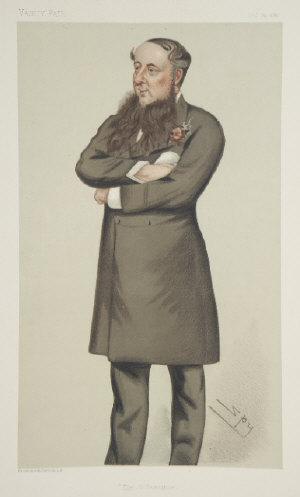
"The O'Donoghue" as caricatured by Spy (Leslie Ward in Vanity Fair, October 1880

Daniel O'Donoghue (1833 – 7 October 1889) was an Irish politician. He served in the British Parliament from 1857 to 1865 as Member of Parliament (MP) for County Tipperary, and from 1865 to 1885 as MP for Tralee.

There is a tomb inside Muckross Abbey near Killarney in County Kerry which bears the inscription "O'Donoghue of the Glens": this may be Daniel O'Donoghue's final resting place.

== Notes ==
Parliament of the United Kingdom
| Preceded by Francis Scully; James Sadleir | Member of Parliament for County Tipperary; 1857 – 1865; With: Francis Scully 1857; Laurence Waldron 1857–1865 | Succeeded by Charles Moore; Laurence Waldron |
| Preceded by Thomas O'Hagan | Member of Parliament for Tralee; 1865 – 1885 | Constituency abolished |
