= Laurence Waldron =

Member of Parliament for County Tipperary
- In office 14 April 1857 – 24 July 1865 Serving with Charles Moore (February 1865–July 1865); Daniel O'Donoghue (1857–1865)
- Preceded by: Francis Scully; Daniel O'Donoghue
- Succeeded by: Charles Moore; John Blake Dillon

Personal details
- Born: 1811
- Died: 3 April 1875 (aged 63)
- Party: Liberal
- Other political affiliations: Whig
- Spouse: Anne White
- Children: Laurence Ambrose Waldron

Laurence Waldron (1811 – 3 April 1875) was an Irish Independent Liberal, Liberal and Whig politician. He sat in the House of Commons of the United Kingdom from 1857 to 1865 as one of the two Members of Parliament (MPs) for County Tipperary.

Waldron married Anne White, daughter of Francis White. He had at least one son, Laurence Ambrose Waldron, who was an Irish Parliamentary Party MP for Dublin St Stephen's Green from 1904 to 1910.

Waldron first stood for Parliament as a Whig at a by-election in County Tipperary, caused by the expulsion of James Sadleir from the House of Commons. Unsuccessful on this occasion, he was elected as a Whig for the same seat just a month later at the 1857 general election, holding the seat — standing as a Liberal in 1859 — until he stood down in 1865. Upon the death of John Blake Dillon in 1866, he stood for the seat again, this time as an Independent Liberal, but was unsuccessful.

He was also at some point a Deputy Lieutenant.

Parliament of the United Kingdom
Preceded by Francis Scully; Daniel O'Donoghue	Member of Parliament for County Tipperary; 1857 – 1865; With: Charles Moore (February 1865–July 1865); Daniel O'Donoghue (1857–1865)	Succeeded by Charles Moore; John Blake Dillon
