= Evening Telegraph (Dublin) =

Irish newspaper (1871–1924)

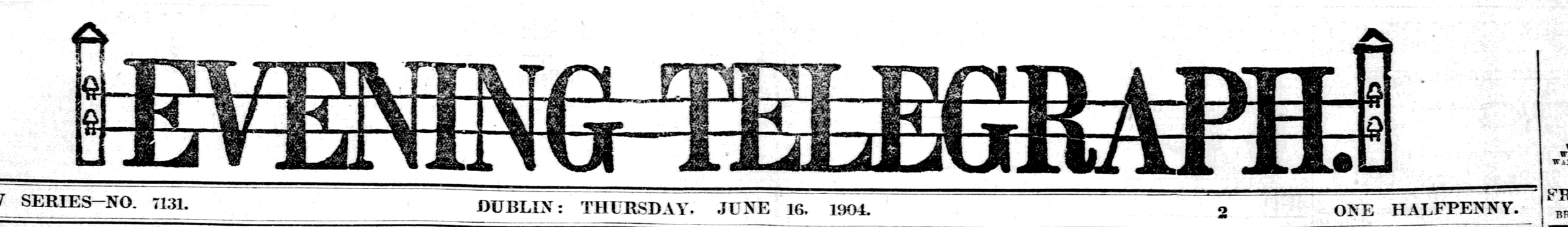

- Evening Telegraph, 16 June 1904
- Type: Newspaper, Private
- Format: Broadsheet
- Founder: Edmund Dwyer Gray
- Editor: unknown
- Founded: 1871
- Ceased publication: 1924
- Political alignment: moderate Irish nationalist
- Headquarters: unknown

The Evening Telegraph was for most of its existence Ireland's leading evening newspaper. It was published in Dublin between 1871 and 1924. Its main rivals were the widely read Dublin Evening Mail and the less widely read Evening Herald.

== History and legacy ==
=== Launch ===
The Evening Telegraph was launched in 1871 by a former Irish nationalist Lord Mayor of Dublin Edmund Dwyer Gray. The newspaper was unavowedly Irish nationalist in its politics. It was originally a weekly newspaper but soon became daily (except Sundays).

It was particularly famous for the attention it paid to covering social events, and for its use of drawings as illustrations.

A project is currently underway to help restore a 16 June 1904 edition.

=== Distinctive pink colour ===
The paper was published on distinctive pink newsprint, which marked it out visually from the buff (brownish-yellow) paper colour used by one of its Dublin rivals, the Dublin Evening Mail.

=== Literary association ===
Leopold Bloom sells advertising for the Evening Telegraph in James Joyce's novel Ulysses.

=== Closure in 1924 ===
The paper was published between 1871 and 1924. It closed in the same year as the main daily Nationalist newspaper, the Freeman's Journal. It is unclear whether the elimination of the Irish Parliamentary Party in the 1918 general election, and the achievement of dominion status as opposed to the IPP's desired home rule, undermined the need for the old Nationalist newspapers attached to a political order that had been swept away between 1916 and 1922.
