= March 1875 County Tipperary by-election =

UK parliamentary by-election

The March 1875 County Tipperary by-election took place on 11 March 1875. The by-election, to one of two seats in the UK House of Commons constituency of County Tipperary, arose due to the disqualification of the recently elected member, John Mitchel, who had won an uncontested by-election the previous month.

At a meeting of the Mitchell Committee on 21 February in the Hibernian Hotel Tipperary, it was resolved that "no honourable course was open to the constituency but to re-nominate John Mitchel as the candidate of the people's choice". Mitchel made it clear that, if he was elected, he had no intention of going to Parliament. Although it was widely expected that no other candidate would be nominated, at the last moment, a Conservative, Captain Stephen Moore, put himself forward. It was expected that he would be defeated in the vote, but since Mitchel was bound to be disqualified again it was anticipated that Moore would then be awarded the seat by default. As expected, Mitchel won a comfortable majority. His majority was over 2,300, with around 500 spoilt votes.

Having complained of ill-health during the campaign, Mitchel died unexpectedly on 20 March 1875. As expected, the courts subsequently invalidated his election and awarded the seat to Moore, who remained as MP until the next election, in 1880, when he retired.

March 1875 County Tipperary by-election
Party	Candidate	Votes	%	±%
Ind. Nationalist	John Mitchel	3,114	80.7	N/A
Conservative	Stephen Moore	746	19.3	New
Majority		2,368	61.4	N/A
Turnout		3,860	37.4	N/A
Registered electors		10,315		
Conservative gain from Ind. Nationalist				
