= 1877 County Tipperary by-election =

UK Parliamentary by-election

The 1877 County Tipperary by-election was fought on 15 May 1877. The by-election was fought due to the death of the incumbent Home Rule MP, William Frederick Ormonde O'Callaghan. It was won by the Home Rule candidate Edmund Dwyer Gray.
