= Phoenix National and Literary Society =

The Phoenix National and Literary Society (or Phoenix Society) was an 1856–1859 Irish nationalist organisation based in West Cork. It was established in Skibbereen in December 1856 by Jeremiah O'Donovan Rossa, as a revival of the Young Ireland movement suppressed after its 1848 rebellion. Its aim was to encourage intellectuals to become nationalists and vice versa as well as to encourage a Gaelic revival. It was suppressed as seditious in 1859 following action by Magistrates under the direction of the Chief Secretary of Ireland.

== History ==
O'Donovan describes the origin of the society's name in his memoirs:

I remember the night we met to give it a name. Some proposed that it be called the Emmet Monument Association, others proposed other names. I proposed that it be called the Phoenix National and Literary Society — the word Phoenix signifying that the Irish cause was again to rise from the ashes of our martyred nationality. My resolution was carried, and that is how the word Phoenix comes into Irish national history.

(An "Emmet Monument Association", named after Robert Emmet, had been formed in New York in February 1855.)

Originally the Phoenix Society met overtly, with elements of a mechanics' institute and drinking club, attracting scores of young men from West Cork and Kerry. It subscribed to nationalist newspapers and had meeting rooms, first in the drug store of physician Jerrie Crowley, and after his death in Morty "the Second" Downing's. It also began secretly organising paramilitary drills. In January 1858 an account of the speeches at its first-anniversary meeting was published in the Dundalk Democrat; it was later republished elsewhere, coming to the attention of James Stephens and John O'Mahony. Stephens visited the society in May 1858 and persuaded many members to become part of his inchoate Irish Republican Brotherhood (IRB), a secret society bound by unlawful oaths.

There was a wave of concern in late 1858 about alleged "Phoenix Societies", encompassing not only that centred on Skibbereen, but also unnamed proto-IRB groups established elsewhere by Stephens. On 8 December, 15 members were arrested in Cork and Kerry. In Tralee at the 1859 Kerry Spring Assizes, Daniel O'Sullivan Agreem was sentenced to ten years' imprisonment for treason felony despite an exhaustive defence by Thomas O'Hagan. O'Donovan Rossa, Mortimer Moynahan, and William O'Shea were remanded in Cork County Gaol until the Cork Summer Assizes, and the other arrestees released on bail. Moynahan was the clerk of McCarthy Downing, who was the defendants' solicitor and chair of Skibbereen town commissioners. The "Phoenix trials" relied largely on the evidence of Daniel O'Sullivan Goula, an informer hired by Moynahan who turned Queen's evidence, a dishonourable act which stirred support for the defendants. The moderate nationalist press, which had originally presented them as misguided hotheads, switched to regarding them as entrapped innocents. After the 1859 UK election the three Cork detainees agreed with the new Liberal government to plead guilty on condition that they and Agreem would be released for emigration. The Phoenix name was commemorated in New York City, by John O'Mahony and John O'Leary's newspaper The Phoenix and by O'Mahony's "Phoenix Zouaves", a Fenian Brotherhood militia which became part of the 69th Infantry Regiment in the American Civil War.

== Sources ==
- Fleming, N. C.; O'Day, Alan (30 November 2017). Ireland and Anglo-Irish Relations since 1800: Critical Essays: Volume I: Union to the Land War. Routledge. ISBN 978-1-351-15531-1.
- Kennedy, Padraic (September 2010). ""The Indispensable Informer": Daniel O'Sullivan Goula and the Phoenix Society, 1858–59". Éire-Ireland. 45 (3–4): 147–183. doi:10.1353/eir.2010.0015. Project MUSE 444354.
- O'Donovan Rossa, Jeremiah (1898). Rossa's Recollections, 1838 to 1898. Mariner's Harbor, New York: O'Donovan Rossa.
- O'Leary, John (1896). Recollections of Fenians and Fenianism. Vol. I. London: Downey & Company.
- Steward, Patrick; McGovern, Bryan P. (17 July 2013). The Fenians: Irish Rebellion in the North Atlantic World, 1858–1876. Univ. of Tennessee Press. ISBN 978-1-57233-979-8.
- Sullivan, Alexander Martin (1862). The Phœnix Societies in Ireland and America, 1858 and 1862. Dublin: Alexander Martin Sullivan.
