= 1869 County Tipperary by-election =

UK Parliamentary by-election

The 1869 County Tipperary by-election was fought on 27 November 1869. The by-election was fought due to the death of the incumbent MP of the Liberal Party, Charles Moore. It was won by the Independent Nationalist candidate Jeremiah O'Donovan Rossa.
