= 1886 County Carlow by-election =

UK Parliamentary by-election

The 1886 County Carlow by-election was a parliamentary by-election held for the United Kingdom House of Commons constituency of County Carlow on 29 January 1886. The sitting member, Edmund Dwyer Gray had been re-elected in the general election of 1885, but having run and been elected also in the new constituency of Dublin St Stephen's Green, he chose to sit for the latter. The County Carlow seat thus became vacant, and in the ensuing by-election, another Irish Nationalist candidate, John Aloysius Blake, was elected unopposed.
