= County Tipperary (UK Parliament constituency) =

UK parliamentary constituency in Ireland, 1801–1885

- Former county constituency for the House of Commons
- County: County Tipperary

1801–1885
- Seats: 2
- Created from: County Tipperary (IHC)
- Replaced by: East Tipperary; Mid Tipperary; North Tipperary; South Tipperary

County Tipperary was a parliamentary constituency in Ireland, which from 1801 to 1885 returned two Members of Parliament (MPs) to the House of Commons of the United Kingdom.

== Boundaries ==
This constituency comprised the whole of County Tipperary, except the parliamentary boroughs of Cashel (1801–1870) and Clonmel (1801–1885). After the Sligo and Cashel Disfranchisement Act 1870, the borough of Cashel ceased to have separate representation, and eligible voters were added to the roll for the county constituency.

In 1885, the constituency was divided into East Tipperary, Mid Tipperary, North Tipperary, and South Tipperary.

== Members of Parliament ==
Year	1st Member	1st Party	2nd Member	2nd Party
1801	Francis Mathew, Viscount Mathew		John Bagwell	
17 Nov 1806	Montague James Mathew	Whig	Francis Aldborough Prittie	Whig
17 Jul 1818	Montague James Mathew	Whig	Richard Butler, Viscount Cahir	
2 Mar 1819	Montague James Mathew	Whig	William Bagwell	Tory
8 Apr 1819	Francis Aldborough Prittie	Whig	William Bagwell	Tory
28 Jun 1826	Francis Aldborough Prittie	Whig	John Hely-Hutchinson	Whig
21 Aug 1830	Francis Aldborough Prittie	Whig	Thomas Wyse	Whig
12 May 1831	John Hely-Hutchinson	Whig	Thomas Wyse	Whig
8 Aug 1832	Robert Otway-Cave	Whig	Thomas Wyse	Whig
17 Dec 1832	Cornelius O'Callaghan	Whig	Richard Lalor Sheil	Repealer
21 Jan 1835	Robert Otway-Cave	Whig	Richard Lalor Sheil	Repealer
14 Jul 1841	Robert Otway-Cave	Whig	Valentine Maher	Whig
10 Feb 1844	Robert Otway-Cave	Whig	Nicholas Maher	Repealer
21 Feb 1845	Richard Albert Fitzgerald	Repealer	Nicholas Maher	Repealer
11 Aug 1847	Francis Scully	Repealer	Nicholas Maher	Repealer
26 Jul 1852	Francis Scully	Ind. Irish	James Sadleir	Ind. Irish
16 Mar 1857	Francis Scully	Ind. Irish	Daniel O'Donoghue	Ind. Irish
14 Apr 1857	Laurence Waldron	Whig	Daniel O'Donoghue	Ind. Irish
10 May 1859	Laurence Waldron	Liberal	Daniel O'Donoghue	Liberal
24 Feb 1865	Laurence Waldron	Liberal	Charles Moore	Liberal
24 Jul 1865	John Blake Dillon	Liberal	Charles Moore	Liberal
17 Oct 1866	Charles William White	Liberal	Charles Moore	Liberal
27 Nov 1869	Charles William White	Liberal	Jeremiah O'Donovan Rossa	Independent Nationalist
23 Feb 1870	Charles William White	Liberal	Denis Caulfield Heron	Liberal
14 Feb 1874	Charles William White	Home Rule League	William Frederick Ormonde O'Callaghan	Home Rule League
16 Feb 1875	John Mitchel	Independent Nationalist	William Frederick Ormonde O'Callaghan	Home Rule League
27 May 1875	Stephen Moore	Conservative	William Frederick Ormonde O'Callaghan	Home Rule League
16 May 1877	Stephen Moore	Conservative	Edmund Dwyer Gray	Home Rule League
8 Apr 1880	Patrick James Smyth	Home Rule League	John Dillon	Parnellite Home Rule League
Oct 1882	Patrick James Smyth	Irish Parliamentary	John Dillon	Irish Parliamentary
23 Mar 1883	Patrick James Smyth	Irish Parliamentary	Thomas Mayne	Irish Parliamentary
12 Jan 1885	John O'Connor	Irish Parliamentary	Thomas Mayne	Irish Parliamentary
1885	Constituency divided: see East Tipperary, Mid Tipperary, North Tipperary and South Tipperary			

== Elections ==
=== Elections in the 1830s ===
General election 1830: Tipperary
Party	Candidate	Votes	%	±%
Whig	Francis Aldborough Prittie	757	40.5	
Whig	Thomas Wyse	577	30.8	
Whig	John Hely-Hutchinson	537	28.7	
Majority		40	2.1	
Turnout		1,098	37.9	
Registered electors		2,900		
Whig hold		Swing		
Whig hold		Swing		

General election 1831: Tipperary
Party	Candidate	Votes	%
Whig	Thomas Wyse	Unopposed	
Whig	John Hely-Hutchinson	Unopposed	
Registered electors		2,900	
Whig hold			
Whig hold			

Hely-Hutchinson succeeded to the peerage, becoming 3rd Earl of Donoughmore and causing a by-election.

By-election, 8 August 1832: Tipperary
Party	Candidate	Votes	%
Whig	Robert Otway-Cave	Unopposed	
Registered electors		2,900	
Whig hold			

General election 1832: Tipperary
Party	Candidate	Votes	%
Whig	Cornelius O'Callaghan	Unopposed	
Repeal	Richard Lalor Sheil	Unopposed	
Registered electors		2,369	
Whig hold			
Repeal gain from Whig			

General election 1835: Tipperary
Party	Candidate	Votes	%
Whig	Robert Otway-Cave	Unopposed	
Repeal (Whig)	Richard Lalor Sheil	Unopposed	
Registered electors		2,369	
Whig hold			
Repeal hold			

General election 1837: Tipperary
Party	Candidate	Votes	%
Repeal (Whig)	Richard Lalor Sheil	1,516	38.2
Whig	Robert Otway-Cave	1,503	37.9
Conservative	William Ponsonby Barker	480	12.1
Conservative	Stephen Moore	471	11.9
Majority		1,023	25.8
Turnout		2,055	65.6
Registered electors		3,135	
Whig hold			
Repeal hold			

Sheil was appointed as Commissioner of Greenwich Hospital, requiring a by-election.

By-election, 27 February 1838: Tipperary
Party	Candidate	Votes	%	±%
Repeal (Whig)	Richard Lalor Sheil	201	72.0	−4.1
Conservative	Samuel William Barton	78	28.0	+4.0
Majority		123	44.0	+18.2
Turnout		279	c. 8.9	c. −56.7
Registered electors		c. 3,135		
Repeal hold		Swing	+4.1	

Sheil was appointed as vice-president of the Board of Trade, requiring a by-election.

By-election, 16 September 1839: Tipperary
Party	Candidate	Votes	%
Repeal (Whig)	Richard Lalor Sheil	Unopposed	
Repeal hold			

=== Elections in the 1840s ===
General election 1841: Tipperary
Party	Candidate	Votes	%	±%
Whig	Valentine Maher	1,039	36.6	−1.6
Whig	Robert Otway-Cave	1,028	36.2	−1.7
Conservative	William Ponsonby Barker	401	14.1	+2.0
Conservative	Cornwallis Maude	374	13.2	+1.3
Majority		627	22.1	−3.7
Turnout		1,445	54.5	−11.1
Registered electors		2,649		
Whig hold		Swing	−1.6	
Whig gain from Repeal		Swing	−1.7	

Maher's death caused a by-election.

By-election, 10 February 1844: Tipperary
Party	Candidate	Votes	%	±%
Repeal	Nicholas Maher	Unopposed		
Repeal gain from Whig				

Otway-Cave's death caused a by-election.

By-election, 21 February 1845: Tipperary
Party	Candidate	Votes	%	±%
Repeal	Richard Albert Fitzgerald	Unopposed		
Repeal gain from Whig				

General election 1847: Tipperary
Party	Candidate	Votes	%	±%
Repeal	Francis Scully	Unopposed		
Repeal	Nicholas Maher	Unopposed		
Registered electors		2,412		
Repeal gain from Whig				
Repeal gain from Whig				

=== Elections in the 1850s ===
General election 1852: Tipperary
Party	Candidate	Votes	%	±%
Independent Irish	Francis Scully	3,512	44.9	N/A
Independent Irish	James Sadleir	3,467	44.3	N/A
Conservative	Robert Jocelyn Otway	789	10.1	New
Conservative	Lorenzo Henry Jephson	53	0.7	New
Majority		2,678	34.2	N/A
Turnout		3,911 (est)	57.9 (est)	N/A
Registered electors		6,760		
Independent Irish gain from Repeal		Swing	N/A	
Independent Irish gain from Repeal		Swing	N/A	

Sadleir was expelled from the House of Commons due to failing to surrender to arrest warrants for his involvement in a fraud, causing a by-election.

By-election, 16 March 1857: Tipperary
Party	Candidate	Votes	%	±%
Independent Irish	Daniel O'Donoghue	3,394	57.8	−31.4
Whig	Laurence Waldron	2,474	42.2	N/A
Majority		920	15.6	−18.4
Turnout		5,868	65.5	+7.6
Registered electors		8,964		
Independent Irish hold		Swing		

General election 1857: Tipperary
Party	Candidate	Votes	%	±%
Independent Irish	Daniel O'Donoghue	Unopposed		
Whig	Laurence Waldron	Unopposed		
Registered electors		8,964		
Independent Irish hold				
Whig gain from Independent Irish				

General election 1859: Tipperary
Party	Candidate	Votes	%	±%
Liberal	Daniel O'Donoghue	Unopposed		
Liberal	Laurence Waldron	Unopposed		
Registered electors		9,526		
Liberal hold				
Liberal hold				

=== Elections in the 1860s ===
O'Donoghue resigned, causing a by-election.

By-election, 24 February 1865: Tipperary
Party	Candidate	Votes	%	±%
Liberal	Charles Moore	2,134	70.1	N/A
Independent Liberal	Peter Edward Gill	909	29.9	New
Majority		1,225	40.2	N/A
Turnout		3,043	33.8	N/A
Registered electors		8,996		
Liberal hold				

General election 1865: Tipperary
Party	Candidate	Votes	%	±%
Liberal	Charles Moore	2,722	43.1	N/A
Liberal	John Blake Dillon	2,662	42.2	N/A
Independent Liberal	Peter Edward Gill	930	14.7	N/A
Majority		1,732	27.5	N/A
Turnout		3,622 (est)	40.3 (est)	N/A
Registered electors		8,996		
Liberal hold				
Liberal hold				

Dillon's death caused a by-election.

By-election, 22 October 1866: Tipperary
Party	Candidate	Votes	%	±%
Liberal	Charles William White	3,419	54.4	−30.9
Independent Liberal	Laurence Waldron	2,865	45.6	N/A
Majority		554	8.8	−18.7
Turnout		6,284	69.9	+29.6
Registered electors		8,996		
Liberal hold		Swing		

General election 1868: Tipperary
Party	Candidate	Votes	%	±%
Liberal	Charles Moore	Unopposed		
Liberal	Charles William White	Unopposed		
Registered electors		9,498		
Liberal hold				
Liberal hold				

Moore's death caused a by-election.

By-election, 27 November 1869: Tipperary
Party	Candidate	Votes	%	±%
Ind. Nationalist	Jeremiah O'Donovan Rossa	1,131	52.1	New
Liberal	Denis Caulfield Heron	1,028	47.4	N/A
Conservative	William Rickford Collett	12	0.6	New
Majority		103	4.7	N/A
Turnout		2,171	22.9	N/A
Registered electors		9,498		
Ind. Nationalist gain from Liberal		Swing	N/A	

=== Elections in the 1870s ===
Rossa was disqualified as he was a convicted felon, causing a by-election.

1870 County Tipperary by-election
Party	Candidate	Votes	%	±%
Liberal	Denis Caulfield Heron	1,668	50.1	N/A
Ind. Nationalist	Charles Kickham	1,664	49.9	N/A
Majority		4	0.2	N/A
Turnout		3,332	35.1	N/A
Registered electors		9,498		
Liberal gain from Ind. Nationalist				

General election 1874: Tipperary
Party	Candidate	Votes	%	±%
Home Rule	Charles William White	3,023	32.9	New
Home Rule	William Frederick Ormonde O'Callaghan	2,755	30.0	New
Ind. Nationalist	John Mitchel	1,788	19.5	N/A
Home Rule	George Roe	705	7.7	New
Ind. Nationalist	Peter Gill	635	6.9	N/A
Liberal	Richard Butler	281	3.1	N/A
Majority		967	10.5	N/A
Turnout		4,594 (est)	48.4 (est)	N/A
Registered electors		9,500		
Home Rule gain from Liberal				
Home Rule gain from Liberal				

White resigned, causing a by-election.

February 1875 County Tipperary by-election
Party	Candidate	Votes	%	±%
Ind. Nationalist	John Mitchel	Unopposed		
Registered electors		10,315		
Ind. Nationalist gain from Home Rule				

Mitchel was declared ineligible, causing a by-election.

March 1875 County Tipperary by-election
Party	Candidate	Votes	%	±%
Ind. Nationalist	John Mitchel	3,114	80.7	N/A
Conservative	Stephen Moore	746	19.3	New
Majority		2,368	61.4	N/A
Turnout		3,860	37.4	N/A
Registered electors		10,315		
Conservative gain from Ind. Nationalist				

Mitchel was again declared ineligible (and died) and, on 26 May 1875, Moore was awarded the seat.

O'Callaghan's death caused a by-election.

1877 County Tipperary by-election
Party	Candidate	Votes	%	±%
Home Rule	Edmund Dwyer Gray	3,852	74.1	N/A
Home Rule	John Sarsfield Casey	1,344	25.9	N/A
Majority		2,508	48.2	N/A
Turnout		5,196	55.9	N/A
Registered electors		9,927		
Home Rule hold				

=== Elections in the 1880s ===
General election 1880: Tipperary
Party	Candidate	Votes	%	±%
Parnellite Home Rule League	John Dillon	Unopposed		
Home Rule	Patrick James Smyth	Unopposed		
Registered electors		9,134		
Home Rule hold				
Home Rule hold				

Dillon resigned, causing a by-election.

1883 County Tipperary by-election
Party	Candidate	Votes	%	±%
Irish Parliamentary	Thomas Mayne	Unopposed		
Registered electors		8,730		
Irish Parliamentary hold				

Smyth was appointed secretary to the Irish loan fund board, causing a by-election.

1885 County Tipperary by-election
Party	Candidate	Votes	%	±%
Irish Parliamentary	John O'Connor	Unopposed		
Irish Parliamentary hold				

== Sources ==
- Leigh Rayment's Historical List of MPs – Constituencies beginning with "T" (part 1)
- The Parliaments of England by Henry Stooks Smith (1st edition published in three volumes 1844–50), 2nd edition edited (in one volume) by F.W.S. Craig (Political Reference Publications 1973)
- Walker, Brian M., ed. (1978). Parliamentary Election Results in Ireland, 1801–1922. Royal Irish Academy.
