= Jane Mitchel =

Irish nationalist

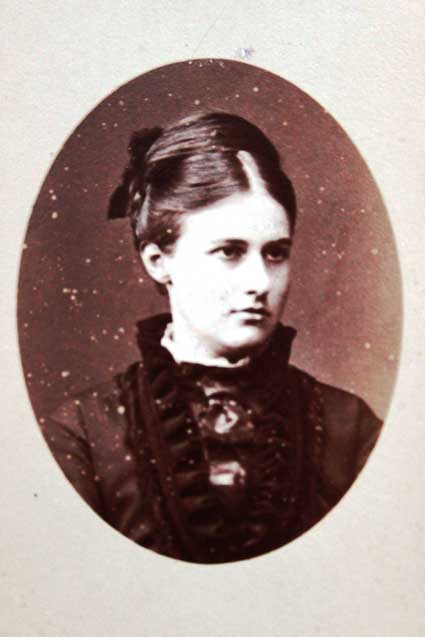
- Mitchel at age 15
- Born: Jane Verner c. 1820 near Newry, County Down
- Died: 31 December 1899 (aged 79); Bedford Park, New York
- Resting place: Woodlawn cemetery, New York
- Spouse: John Mitchel

Jane "Jenny" Mitchel (c. 1820 – 31 December 1899) was an Irish nationalist who joined her husband, John Mitchel, in exile in the United States where, with their sons, they sided on a pro-slavery platform with the secessionist South in the Civil War.

== Early life and family ==
Jane Mitchel was born Jane Verner around 1820 near Newry, County Down. At the time she, her brother and her mother Mary Ward were living with Captain James Verner (1777–1847). James Verner was from a prominent Armagh family, and was involved in the Orange Order, going on to become Orange deputy grandmaster of Ireland in 1824. Although James Verner raised Mitchel, she is not believed to be his child. Mitchel attended Miss Bryden's School for Young Ladies in Newry.

Mitchel met her husband, John Mitchel, when she was 15. The couple eloped in November 1836, but did not marry as James Verner pursued them to Chester and brought her home to Ireland. They eloped again in 1837, and were married at Drumcree Church, near Portadown in the north of County Armagh, on 3 February. At this point Mitchel was disowned by James Verner, and went to live with her in-laws at Dromalane, County Down. They then moved to Banbridge in 1839 where her husband practised law. The couple went on to have six children, three daughters and three sons.

The couple moved to Dublin in October 1845 when John Mitchel became the assistant editor of The Nation. They lived at 8 Ontario Terrace, Rathmines, where there were Young Irelanders met. She was a full supporter of her husband's nationalism. She aided in his work with The Nation, reading other newspapers, keeping and filing reference clippings, going on to become and editor and anonymous contributor to the United Irishman from February 1848. John Mitchel was convicted of treason for inciting insurrection in May 1848, and was sentenced to fourteen years' transportation. Mitchel urged his fellow Young Irelanders to fight his removal, and denounced them when they failed to come out in support of him.

== Exile ==
Due to her standing in the nationalist community, £1,450 was raised to support her and her family. For three years, Mitchel lived in Newry and Dublin, before she joined her husband Van Diemen's Land (Tasmania) in June 1851, where they settled in the village of Bothwell. Their youngest child, Isabel, was born there in 1853.

The Mitchels travelled around the island with her husband, visiting fellow Irish exiles, becoming fond of William Smith O'Brien in particular.

When John Mitchel escaped in July 1853, Mitchel travelled with her children to join him in Sydney, from where they sailed to America. They lived for a time in Brooklyn, New York from 1853 to 1855, rekindling friendships with old friends who were fellow Young Ireland exiles.

In May 1855, the family moved to a remote farm at Tucaleechee Cove in the Allegheny Mountains, Tennessee. Mitchel feared that the isolation and life in a primitive log cabin would be detrimental to their children's education, and at her behest the family moved to Knoxville, Tennessee in September 1856. From here John Mitchel ran a pro-slavery newspaper, the Southern Citizen.

The family moved again in December 1858 to Washington, D.C. Mitchel supported her husband in the Southern cause, albeit with some reservation. Nothing, she said, would induce her "to become the mistress of a slave household". Her objection to slavery was "the injury it does to the white masters".

Mitchel accompanied her husband to Paris in September 1860, and in opposition to some of the family, she supported her daughter Henrietta's conversion to Catholicism and entrance into a convent. She remained in Paris and Ireland with her daughters, while her husband and sons assisted the Confederacy during the American Civil War. Without letting her husband know, Mitchel resolved to return to America when she heard of her youngest son, William's, death at Gettysburg in July 1863. She sailed with her daughters, Mary and Isabel, as Henrietta had died earlier the same year. Whilst their ship ran a blockade by the Union, the ship was shelled, ran aground, and caught fire near the coast of North Carolina. Mitchel and her daughters were unhurt, but lost all of their possessions. By December 1863, Mitchel had joined her husband in Richmond, Virginia, remaining their for the rest of the Civil War. Their eldest son, John, was killed in action in July 1864.

== Later life ==
The family returned to New York after the war, and John Mitchel set up another paper, the Irish Citizen (1867–72). Due to lack of funding for the Irish-American press and her husband's ill health resulted in the family falling into poverty. This was alleviated by a testimonial raised by William and John Dillon in 1873. Mitchel was widowed in March 1875, going on to receive $30,000 from nationalist sympathisers. She invested this money in a photolithographic firm she and her son, James, ran. Mitchel died at home in Bedford Park, New York on 31 December 1899. She is buried in Woodlawn cemetery, New York, with her plot marked with a large Celtic cross. She was survived by two of her children, James (1840–1908) and Mary (1846–1910).
