= Mary Jane O'Donovan Rossa =

Irish nationalist, poet (1845–1916)

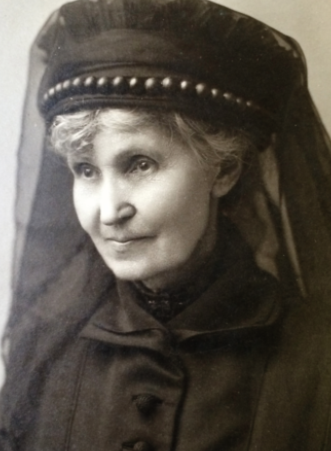
- Pictured in 1915
- Born: Mary Jane Irwin; 27 January 1845; Clonakilty, County Cork
- Died: 18 August 1916 (aged 71); New York City
- Spouse: Jeremiah O'Donovan Rossa

Mary Jane O'Donovan Rossa (27 January 1845 – 18 August 1916) was an Irish poet and political activist.

== Early life and family ==
Mary Jane O'Donovan Rossa, born Mary Jane Irwin, was born in Clonakilty, County Cork on 27 January 1845. She was the daughter of Maxwell Irwin, a merchant, and a member of the Young Ireland movement. She attended boarding school, at the Sacred Heart Convent, Roscrea, and began writing poetry as a child. She married Jeremiah O'Donovan Rossa on 22 August 1864. Her husband swore her brothers in to the IRB. The couple went on to have 13 children, not all of whom survived into adulthood.

== Fenian activities ==
O'Donovan wrote poetry for the Fenian newspaper The Irish People, writing under the pseudonyms "Cliodhna" and "M.J.I.". In 1865, the newspaper was suppressed and her husband was arrested. She became the secretary of the "ladies committee" which was tasked with collecting money for the families of incarcerated Fenians, which went on to raise funds for the nearly 3000 families needing help. O'Donovan resigned from the committee in March 1867 as police suspected she was using the money to fund the IRB. She wrote to William Ewart Gladstone to lobby for her husband's release, but received no reply.

== Life in America ==
Following the advice of her husband, O'Donovan emigrated to New York City. Her fare was paid by Richard Pigott. She supported herself by public speaking, writing, and giving elocution lessons. Her only volume of poetry, Irish lyrical poems, was published in 1868 in New York. Her husband was released from prison in January 1871, and joined her in New York, where they lived for the next 20 years at 1009 Hancock Street, Brooklyn. The family moved to Staten Island after the death of their son Maxwell in 1893.

== Later life ==
O'Donovan was a supporter of female suffrage and Clan na Gael, but also believed that female organisations, such as Cumann na mBan, should take a subservient role to their male counterparts in politics. The couple left America in November 1905 for her husband to take up a position with Cork County Council. Owing to her poor health, O'Donovan returned to America in February 1906, with her husband leaving his job to follow her. From 1910 to his death, her husband was hospitalised due to his failing health. O'Donovan accompanied his remains back to Ireland in August 1915.

When back in Ireland, O'Donovan published a number of articles in the press and several poems. Having returned to America, she reported on events in Ireland for the Gaelic American. In memory of Padraig Pearse, her last poem was written days before her own death. O'Donovan died in New York on 18 August 1916.
