= Edmund Dwyer Gray =

Irish politician (1845–1888)

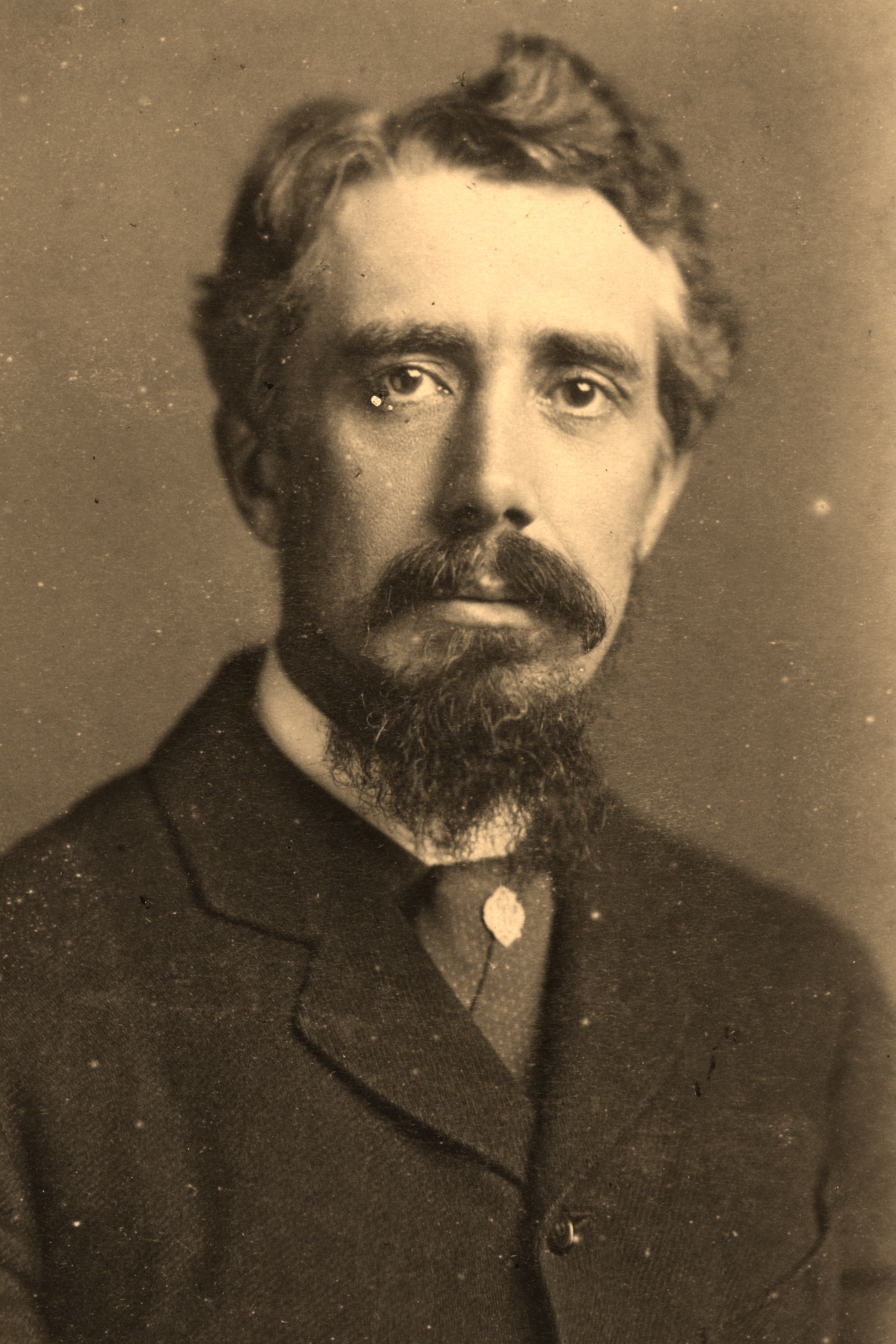
- Gray, c. 1880s

Member of Parliament for Dublin St Stephen's Green
- In office 1885–1888
- Preceded by: New constituency
- Succeeded by: Thomas Alexander Dickson

Member of Parliament for County Carlow
- In office 1880–1886 Serving with Donald Horne Macfarlane
- Preceded by: Henry Bruen; Arthur MacMurrough Kavanagh
- Succeeded by: John Aloysius Blake

Member of Parliament for County Tipperary
- In office 1877–1880 Serving with Stephen Moore
- Preceded by: Stephen Moore; William O'Callaghan
- Succeeded by: Patrick James Smyth; John Dillon

Lord Mayor of Dublin
- In office 1880–1881
- Preceded by: John Barrington
- Succeeded by: George Moyers

Personal details
- Born: 29 December 1845 Dublin, Ireland
- Died: 27 March 1888 (aged 42) Dublin, Ireland
- Resting place: Glasnevin Cemetery, Dublin
- Party: Home Rule League; Irish Parliamentary Party
- Children: Edmund Dwyer-Gray
- Parent(s): Sir John Gray, Anna Dwyer

Edmund William Dwyer Gray (29 December 1845 – 27 March 1888) was an Irish newspaper proprietor, politician and MP in the House of Commons of the United Kingdom of Great Britain and Ireland. He was also Lord Mayor and later High Sheriff of Dublin City and became a strong supporter of Charles Stewart Parnell.

== Early life and family ==
Gray was born on 29 December 1845 in Dublin, the second son of Sir John Gray and his wife, Anna Dwyer. After receiving his education, he joined his father in managing the Freeman's Journal, the oldest nationalist newspaper in Ireland. When his father died in 1875, Gray took over proprietorship of the Journal, and his family's other newspaper properties such as the Belfast Morning News and the Dublin Evening Telegraph.

In 1868, Gray saved five people from drowning in a wrecked schooner at Killiney Bay, an action for which he received the Tayleur Fund Gold Medal for bravery from the Royal Humane Society. By coincidence, the rescue was witnessed by his future wife, Caroline Agnes Gray, whom he would meet shortly afterwards. Agnes was the daughter of Caroline Chisholm (an English humanitarian renowned for her work in female immigrant welfare in Australia), and although Gray was descended from a Protestant family of the Church of Ireland, he converted to Catholicism to marry her. The wedding in London on 17 July 1869 was conducted by the Bishop of Northampton. The couple had one son, Edmund Dwyer-Gray, who would take over from his father as proprietor of his newspapers and would go on to become Premier of Tasmania.

== Political career ==
From 1875 to 1883, Gray served as a member of the Dublin Corporation, and in 1880 served a term as Lord Mayor of Dublin. Unusually for an Irish nationalist politician, Gray was very much focussed on urban rather than rural affairs, and like his father was heavily involved in public health and water provision for Dublin. He also promoted reform in the municipal health system.

Gray unsuccessfully ran for his father's seat of Kilkenny City at Westminster in the 1875 by-election that followed Sir John Gray's death. He won a later by-election in 1877, becoming a Member of Parliament representing County Tipperary for the Home Rule League. At the 1880 general election, he was elected for County Carlow. At the 1885 election, as a member of the Irish Parliamentary Party, he won representation of both County Carlow and the new constituency of Dublin St Stephen's Green, and chose to represent the latter.

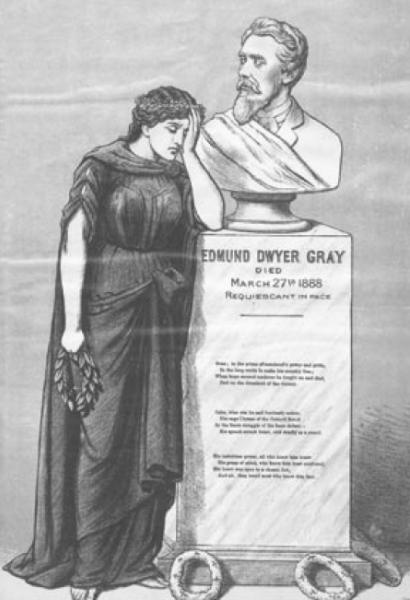
Memorial cartoon depicting Hibernia in mourning, published in Parnell's United Ireland newspaper shortly after Gray's death.

He was imprisoned for six weeks in 1882 for remarks made in the Freeman's Journal with regard to the composition of the jury in the case of a murder trial. (Gray was actually High Sheriff of the City of Dublin at the time of his imprisonment, and – because of the conflict of office – was taken into custody by the city coroner.) The defendant in the case in question was later hanged.

A heavy drinker and asthma sufferer, Gray died aged 42 after a short illness on 27 March 1888, and was buried at Glasnevin Cemetery.

Parliament of the United Kingdom
Preceded by Stephen Moore; William O'Callaghan	Member of Parliament for County Tipperary; 1877–1880; With: Stephen Moore	Succeeded by Patrick James Smyth; John Dillon
Preceded by Henry Bruen; Arthur MacMurrough Kavanagh	Member of Parliament for County Carlow; 1880–1886; With: Donald Horne Macfarlane 1880–1885	Succeeded by John Aloysius Blake
New constituency	Member of Parliament for Dublin St Stephen's Green; 1885–1888	Succeeded by Thomas Alexander Dickson
Civic offices
Preceded by John Barrington	Lord Mayor of Dublin; 1880–1881	Succeeded by George Moyers
