= Charles William White (Irish politician) =

Irish Member of Parliament

Charles William White (9 September 1838 – 15 October 1890) was an Irish Member of Parliament (MP) in the House of Commons of the United Kingdom of Great Britain and Ireland.

He was elected as one of the two MPs for County Tipperary at a by-election in 1866 following the death of the sitting MP John Blake Dillon, who had been one of the founding members of the Young Ireland movement. He was re-elected at the 1868 and 1874 general elections, but resigned from Parliament on 6 February 1875. He gave no explanation for his resignation, although it was speculated at the time that his support for the Home Rule campaign was 'very reluctant' and his 'heart was not in the cause', and that at the same time he had been advised that his advocacy of Home Rule was inconsistent with his position as an officer in the British Army.

He was appointed Lord Lieutenant of Clare in 1872 and held office until 1879.

Parliament of the United Kingdom
Preceded by Charles Moore; John Blake Dillon	Member of Parliament for County Tipperary; 1866–1875; With: Charles Moore 1866–1869; Jeremiah O'Donovan Rossa 1869–1870; Denis Caulfield Heron 1870–1874; William O'Callaghan 1874–1875	Succeeded by William O'Callaghan; John Mitchel
Honorary titles
Preceded by The 13th Lord Inchiquin	Lord Lieutenant of Clare; 1872–1879	Succeeded by The 14th Lord Inchiquin
