= John Blake Dillon =

Irish politician (1814–1866)

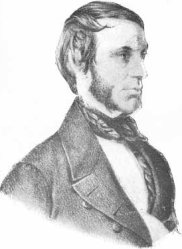
John Blake Dillon (1814 - 1866)

John Blake Dillon (5 May 1814 – 15 September 1866) was an Irish writer and politician who was one of the founding members of the Young Ireland movement.

== Early life and education ==
John Blake Dillon was born in the town of Ballaghaderreen, on the border of counties Mayo and Roscommon. He was a son of Anne Blake and her husband Luke Dillon (d. 1826), who had been a land agent for his cousin Patrick Dillon, 11th Earl of Roscommon. His niece was Anne Deane, who helped to raise his family after his death.

He was educated at St. Patrick's College, Maynooth, leaving after only two years there, having decided that he was not meant for the priesthood. He later studied law at Trinity College, Dublin (TCD), and in London, before being called to the Irish Bar.

It was during his time at TCD that he first met and befriended Thomas Davis.

== Career ==
While working for The Morning Register newspaper he met Charles Gavan Duffy, with whom he and Davis founded The Nation in 1842, which was dedicated to promoting Irish nationalism and all three men became important members of Daniel O'Connell's Repeal Association, which advocated the repeal of the Act of Union 1800 between Great Britain and Ireland.

=== Young Ireland uprising ===
The young wing of the party, of which they were key members with William Smith O'Brien and Thomas Francis Meagher, came to be known as Young Ireland and advocated the threat of force to achieve repeal of the Act of Union. This was in contrast to the committed pacifism of O'Connell's "Old Ireland" wing. This posturing eventually led to the Young Ireland rebellion of 1848 where a countryside devastated by the Great Famine failed to rise up and support the rebels.

According to fellow Irish nationalist, Justin McCarthy:

"...it has been said of him that while he strongly discouraged the idea of armed rebellion, and had no faith in the possibility of Ireland's succeeding by any movement of insurrection, yet when Smith O'Brien risked Ireland's chances in the open field, he cast his lot with his leader and stood by his side in Tipperary."

=== Exile and later return ===
After the failure of Young Ireland's uprising, Dillon fled Ireland, escaping first to France and, eventually, to the United States, where he served the New York Bar.

Dillon returned to Ireland on amnesty in 1855 and in 1865 was elected as a Member of Parliament for County Tipperary. By now he advocated a Federal union of Britain and Ireland and denounced the violent methods advocated by the Irish Republican Brotherhood or Fenian movement.

== Death ==
John Blake Dillon died of cholera in Killiney, Co. Dublin, aged 52, and is buried in Glasnevin Cemetery, Dublin.

== Personal life ==
He was the father of John Dillon, and grandfather of James Dillon.

Parliament of the United Kingdom
| Preceded by Charles Moore; Laurence Waldron | Member of Parliament for County Tipperary; 1865 – 1866; With: Charles Moore | Succeeded by Charles Moore; Charles William White |
