= Stephen Moore (MP) =

Irish politician

Stephen Moore (1836–1897), was an Irish Conservative politician in the Parliament of the United Kingdom of Great Britain and Ireland.

He was born at Barne, Clonmel, County Tipperary. He was the son of Stephen Moore and Anna Pennefather, daughter of Colonel Kingsmill Pennefather and his first wife Rebecca Maria Persse, who was a cousin of the celebrated writer Lady Gregory. Both his parents came from long-established landowning families in Tipperary. The Moores were a branch of the family who held the title Earl Mount Cashell. Richard Moore (1783–1851), Attorney-General for Ireland and later a High Court judge, was Stephen's great-uncle. Stephen married Anna Maria Wilmer, daughter and heiress of Wilmer Wilmer of London, in 1867, and had two sons and four daughters.

Moore, a staunch and lifelong Conservative, was elected to the United Kingdom House of Commons as Member of Parliament (MP) for County Tipperary at a by-election in 1875. He was defeated at the poll in March, but was awarded the seat in May after the victor John Mitchel was declared to be ineligible to enter Parliament, as a convicted felon. Moore then held the seat until the 1880 general election, when he did not stand again.

His wife died in 1886. At his own death in July 1897, which was sudden but not unexpected, from long-standing heart disease, Barne passed to his surviving son, Randall Kingsmill Moore. He was remembered as a good neighbour and a kindly landlord, who prided himself on never evicting a tenant.

Parliament of the United Kingdom
Preceded by John Mitchel; William O'Callaghan	Member of Parliament for County Tipperary; 1875 – 1880; With: William O'Callaghan 1875–1877; Edmund Dwyer Gray 1877–1880	Succeeded by Patrick James Smyth; John Dillon
