= Denis Caulfield Heron =

Irish lawyer and politician (1824–1881)

Denis Caulfield Heron LL.D QC (16 February 1824, Dublin – 15 April 1881, Lough Corrib, County Galway) was an Irish lawyer and politician, who was Catholic Liberal MP for County Tipperary, and a senior legal adviser to the British Crown. He was born in Dublin, the eldest son of William Heron, a merchant, and his wife Mary Maguire of Newry, Co Down. He was educated at Downside School, Stratton-on-the-Fosse, and proceeded to Trinity College Dublin, where he was elected a Scholar.

In December 1845 Heron was the subject of a celebrated hearing at Trinity College Dublin. Heron had previously been examined and, on merit, declared a scholar of the college but had not been allowed to take up his place due to his religion. Heron appealed to the Courts which issued a writ of mandamus requiring the case to be adjudicated by the Archbishop of Dublin and the Primate of Ireland. The decision of Richard Whately and John George Beresford was that Heron would remain excluded from Scholarship.

In 1848 he received his law doctorate, and was called to the Bar. By 1852 Heron was professor of jurisprudence and political economy at Queen's College, Galway. In July 1860 he was appointed Queen's Counsel. He became a Bencher of the King's Inn in 1872. He was Law Adviser to the Lord Lieutenant of Ireland from 1866 to 1868 in which capacity he was much occupied with prosecuting the trials that followed the Fenian Rising of 1867. In 1880 became Third Serjeant-at-law (Ireland). His death the following year put a premature end to a brilliant career.

In the 1869 by-election for County Tipperary constituency, Heron was defeated by 1054 to 898 votes by the incumbent, Jeremiah O'Donovan Rossa. However, the election was declared invalid because Rossa was an imprisoned felon and, in the second election, Heron defeated the Fenian candidate and was returned to the Commons. He held Tipperary until 1874.

He was the author of Constitutional History of the University of Dublin (1847), An Introduction to the History of Jurisprudence (1860), and Principles of Jurisprudence (1873). He was a long-standing member of the Statistical and Social Inquiry Society of Ireland, and served as its vice-president for several years.

Denis Caulfield Heron, who was a keen sportsman, died suddenly of a heart attack while he was salmon fishing in the Corrib River in County Galway in April 1881. He was buried in Glasnevin Cemetery; almost all the leading Irish legal and political figures attended the funeral. He had married Emily FitzGerald, youngest daughter of David and Catherine FitzGerald, and sister of John FitzGerald, Baron FitzGerald; she predeceased him. They had no children.

Parliament of the United Kingdom
Preceded by Charles William White; Jeremiah O'Donovan Rossa	Member of Parliament for County Tipperary; 1870 – 1874; With: Charles William White	Succeeded by Charles William White; William Frederick Ormonde O'Callaghan
