= John Mitchels GAA =

John Mitchels GAA may refer to:

- John Mitchels GAA (Kerry), a sports club in Tralee, Ireland
- John Mitchels GAA (Waterford), a sports club in Kilmacthomas, Ireland
- John Mitchels GAA (Louth), a sports club in the Ardee area of County Louth

== See also ==
- Castlebar Mitchels GAA, a sports club in County Mayo, Ireland
- John Mitchel GFC, a sports club in Newry, County Down
- John Mitchel's Hurling Club, a sports club in Birmingham, England
- John Mitchel's GAC Claudy, a sports club in Claudy
- John Mitchel's GAC Glenullin, a sports club in Glenullin
- Magheracloone Mitchell's GAC, a sports club in County Monaghan, Ireland
