= Jeremiah O'Donovan Rossa =

Irish republican (1831–1915)

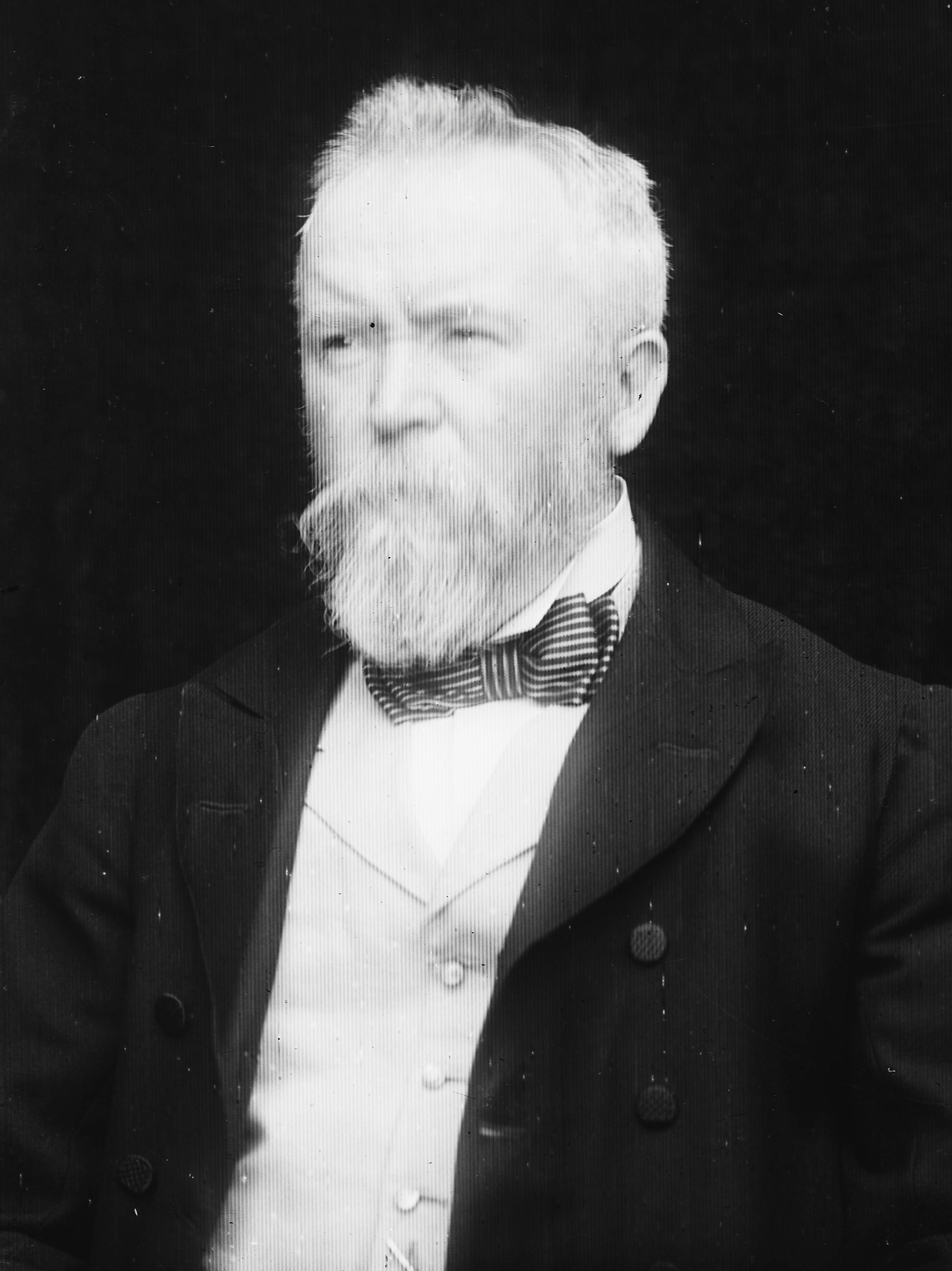
- Rossa, c. 1900

Member of Parliament for County Tipperary
- In office November 1869 – February 1870

Personal details
- Born: Jeremiah Donovan before 4 September 1831 Reanascreena, Rosscarbery, County Cork, Ireland
- Died: 29 June 1915 (aged 83) Staten Island, New York, U.S.
- Spouses: Honora "Nora" Eager; Ellen Buckley (Eileán Ní Bhuachalla); Mary Jane Irwin

Military service
- Allegiance: Fenian Brotherhood; Irish Republican Brotherhood; Clan na Gael; United Irishmen of America
- Years of service: 1858–1915
- Battles/wars: Fenian Rising; Fenian dynamite campaign

Jeremiah O'Donovan Rossa (Irish: Diarmaid Ó Donnabháin Rosa; 4 September 1831 (baptised) – 29 June 1915) was an Irish Fenian leader who was one of the leading members of the Irish Republican Brotherhood (IRB). Born and raised in Rosscarbery, County Cork, he witnessed the Great Famine. Rossa founded the Phoenix National and Literary Society and dedicated his life to working towards the establishment of an independent Irish Republic. He joined the IRB, was arrested by the British and sentenced to life imprisonment. In 1869, he was elected to the British Parliament while in prison. After being exiled to the United States in 1870 as part of the Cuba Five amnesty, Rossa worked with other Irish revolutionary organisations there to oppose British rule in Ireland.

Rossa was one of the primary advocates of physical force Irish republicanism and organised the Fenian dynamite campaign, which saw Irish republican groups carry out bombing attacks in Great Britain, targeting both government and civilian targets. The campaign caused widespread outrage among the British public and Rossa was subject to a failed assassination attempt from an Englishwoman in 1885, the same year the campaign ended. Following his death in 1915, he was buried in Dublin's Glasnevin Cemetery. His funeral served as a rallying point for Irish republicans and is often cited as a direct stepping stone towards the events of the Easter Rising in 1916.

== Early life ==
Jeremiah O'Donovan Rossa was born Jeremiah Donovan in the townland of Reanascreena, Rosscarbery, County Cork, to Denis Donovan and Ellen Driscol, and was baptised on 4 September 1831. His parents were Irish-speaking tenant farmers who raised him in the language. According to the scholar John O'Donovan, with whom Rossa corresponded, Rossa's ancestors belonged to the obscure but ancient sliocht of the MacEnesles or Clan Aneslis O'Donovans. His ancestors had held letters patent in Kilmeen parish in the 17th century before the confiscations, with his agnomen "Rossa" coming from the townland of Rossmore in Kilmeen.

Rossa became a shopkeeper in Skibbereen, where, in 1856, he established the Phoenix National and Literary Society, the aim of which was "the liberation of Ireland by force of arms", This organisation would later become a front for the Irish Republican Brotherhood (IRB), founded two years later in Dublin.

=== Arrest and imprisonment ===
In December 1858, he was arrested and jailed without trial until July 1859. In 1863, he became the business manager of James Stephens' newspaper, The Irish People, which was raided and suppressed in September 1865. As part of the raid, Rossa was arrested and held at Richmond Bridewell prison to await trial by the Special Commission on charges of treason felony. Fanny Parnell, co-founder of the Ladies' Land League with her sister Anna Parnell attended the trial which was thought to have influenced her thinking. He was sentenced to penal servitude for life due to his previous convictions. He served his time in Pentonville, Portland, Millbank and Chatham Convict Prison in England.

Rossa was a defiant prisoner, manacled for 35 straight days for throwing a chamber pot at the prison's warden and thrown into solitary confinement on a bread-and-water diet for three days for refusing to take off his cap in front of the prison's doctor. For most of his time in prison Rossa was denied the right to correspond with his associates in the outside world because he violated prison rules.

In the 1869 County Tipperary by-election, he defeated the Liberal Catholic Denis Caulfield Heron by 1054 to 898 votes. The election was declared invalid because Rossa was an imprisoned felon.

=== Life in the United States ===
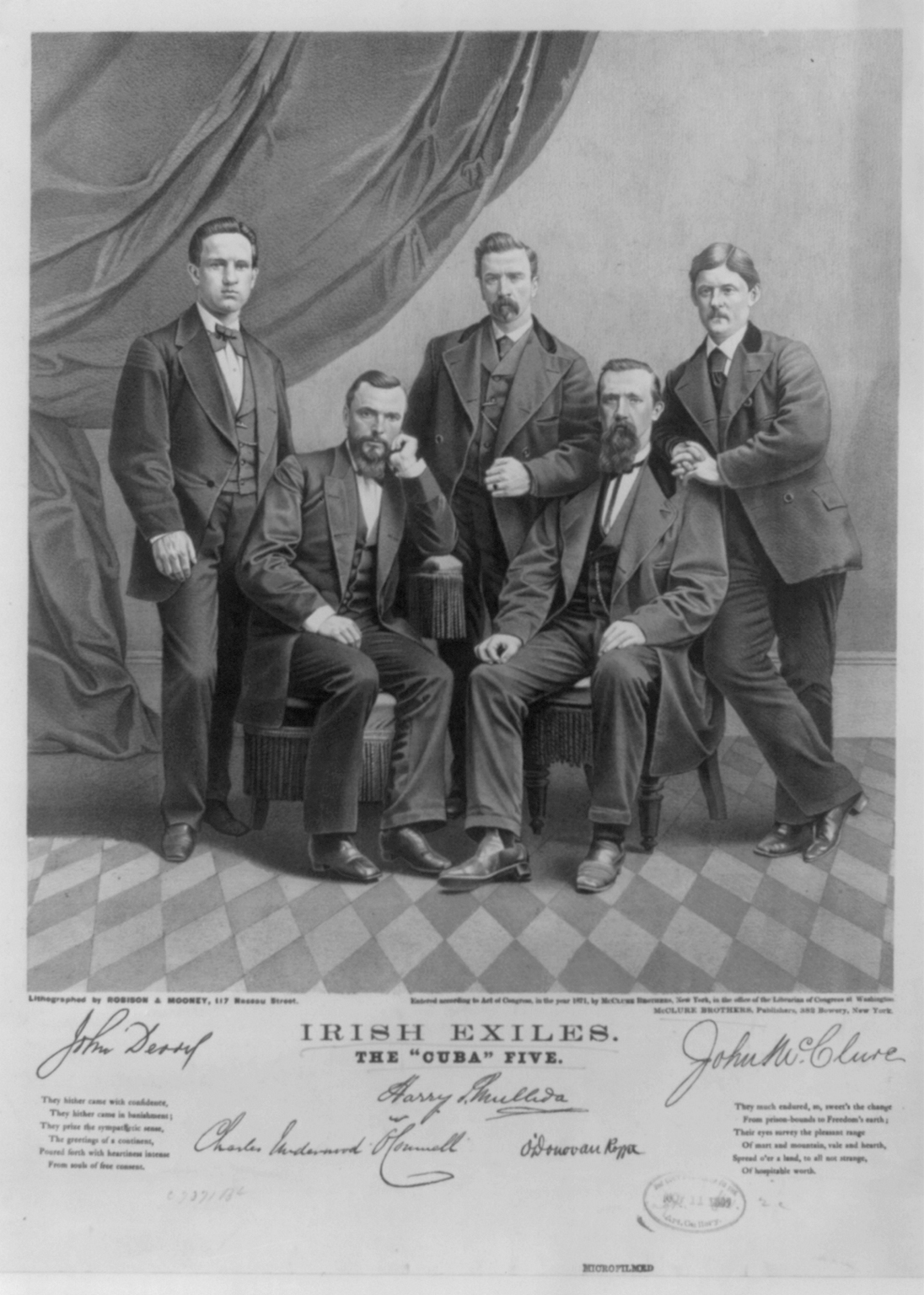
Cuba Five – John Devoy, Charles O'Connell, Henry Mullady, Jeremiah O'Donovan Rossa and John McClure

After giving an understanding that he would not return to Ireland, in effect his exile, Rossa was released as part of the Fenian Amnesty of 1870. Boarding the ship SS Cuba, he left for the United States with his friend John Devoy and three other exiles. Together they were dubbed "The Cuba Five". Rossa took up residence in New York City, where he joined Clan na Gael and the Fenian Brotherhood. Rossa additionally established his own newspaper dedicated to the cause of Irish independence from British rule, The United Irishman. In it, Rossa advocated the use of explosives such as dynamite as a means of overthrowing British rule in Ireland. His paper was used to raise a so-called "resources for civilisation fund," presumably for the purchase of dynamite and other armaments for the Irish struggle.

=== Dynamite campaign ===
Rossa allegedly organised the first-ever bombings by Irish republicans of English and Scottish cities as part of the Fenian dynamite campaign. The campaign lasted through the 1880s and made him infamous in Great Britain. The British government demanded his extradition from America, but without success. Rossa later justified his revolutionary activities in the following manner;

I have myself been called a madman, because I was acting in a way that was not pleasing to England. The longer I live, the more I come to believe that Irishmen will have to go a little mad my way before they go the right way to get any freedom for Ireland.

And why shouldn't an Irishman be mad; when he grows up face to face with the plunderers of his land and race, and sees them looking down upon him as if he were a mere thing of loathing and contempt! They strip him of all that belongs to him and made him a pauper and not only that, but they teach him to look upon the robbers as gentlemen, as beings entirely superior to him. They are called "the nobility," "the quality"; his people are called the "riffraff—the dregs of society."

— Jeremiah O'Donovan Rossa, Rossa Recollections, 1898

=== Failed assassination attempt ===
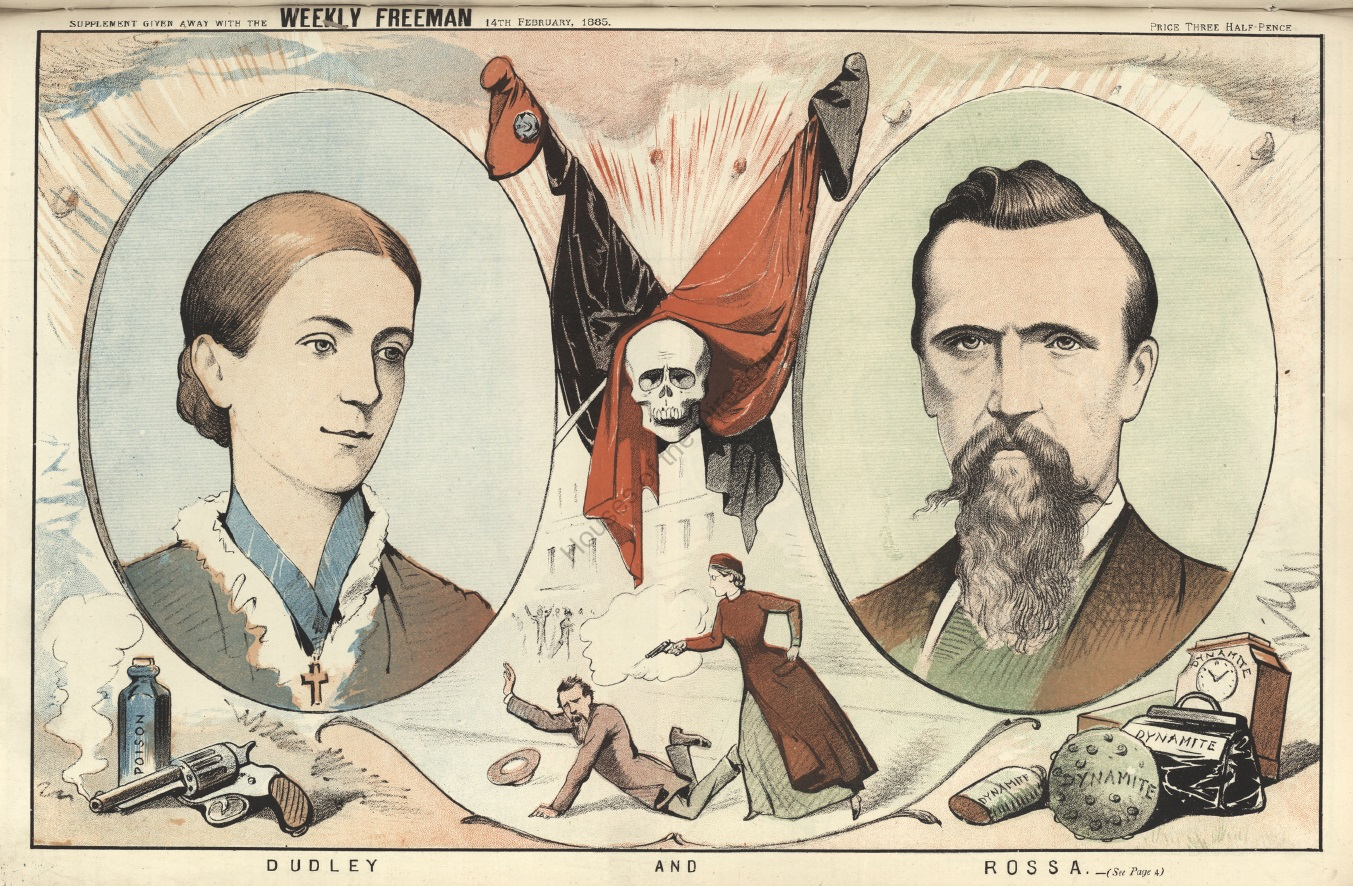
A drawn depiction of a 1885 assassination attempt by Lucille Yseult Dudley on Rossa.

On 2 February 1885, Rossa was shot outside his office near Broadway by an Englishwoman, Lucille Yseult Dudley. He was admitted to the Chambers Street Hospital with gunshot wounds to the back. Even though they were not life-threatening, a ball was to remain embedded there for the rest of his life. "I've been wounded in the war" was Rossa's comment to a friend in the hospital. The British government responded to the incident by stating that Dudley was mentally unstable and not acting on their behalf. Historians have argued that her motivation for the assassination attempt was anger at Rossa's role in the "skirmishing fund", which served as a fundraiser for the dynamite campaign.

== Final years ==
In 1891 Rossa's ban from the United Kingdom expired, and thereafter he undertook lecture tours of Britain and Ireland. While in Ireland in 1894, he allowed himself to be nominated for the office of Dublin City Marshal by supporters, but he was heavily defeated. In 1904 he was made a "Freeman of the City of Cork", and in 1905 he was appointed to a clerkship in the office of the secretary to Cork county council. The role came with an annual salary of £150, badly needed by Rossa at that stage of his life. However, by September 1906 Rossa resigned from the job due to the deteriorating health of his wife. The pair opted instead to return to New York, where Rossa would become an inspector of street openings in Brooklyn. Rossa's own health became increasingly poor from 1910 onwards.

== Death and funeral ==
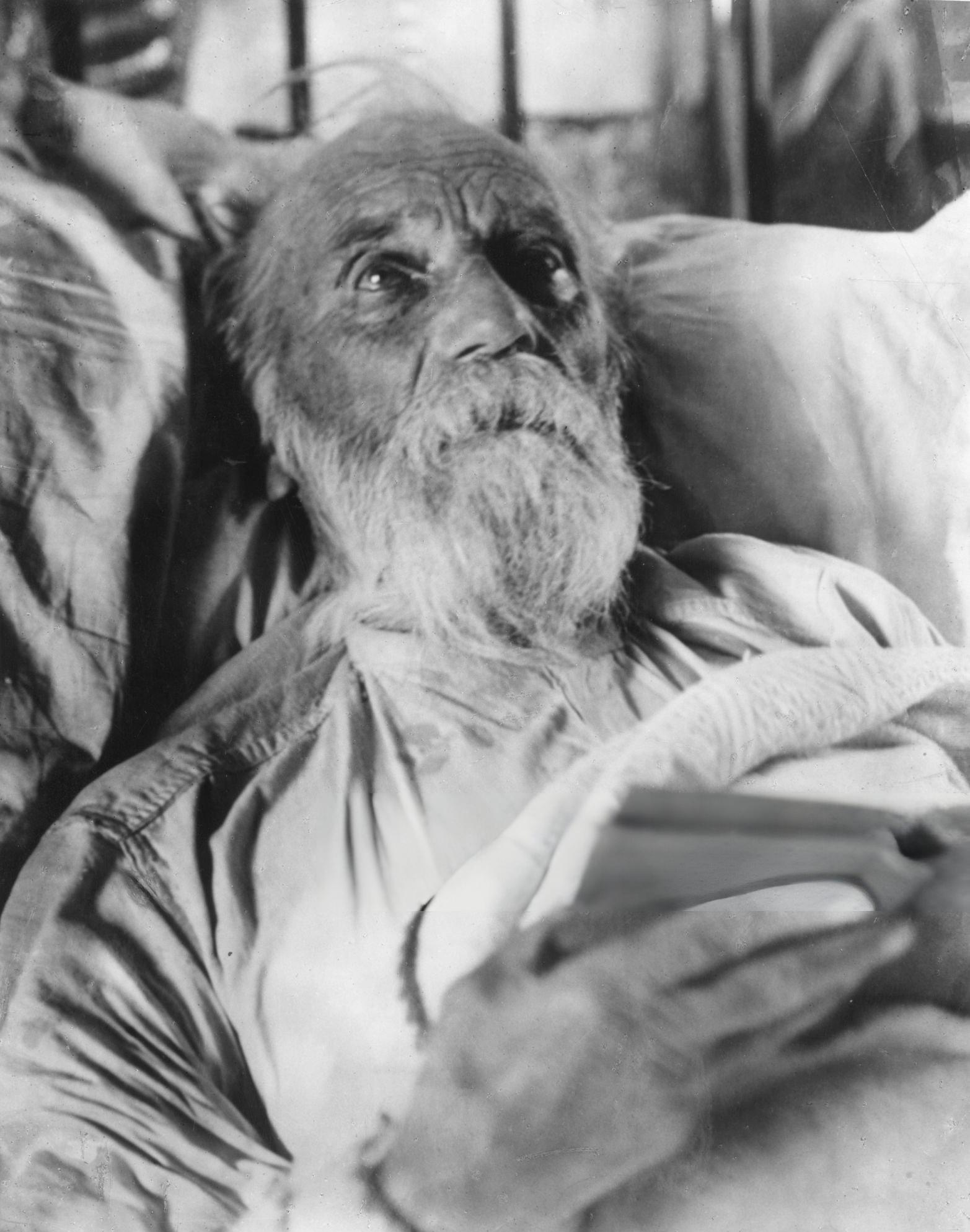
O'Donovan Rossa on his deathbed, June 1915

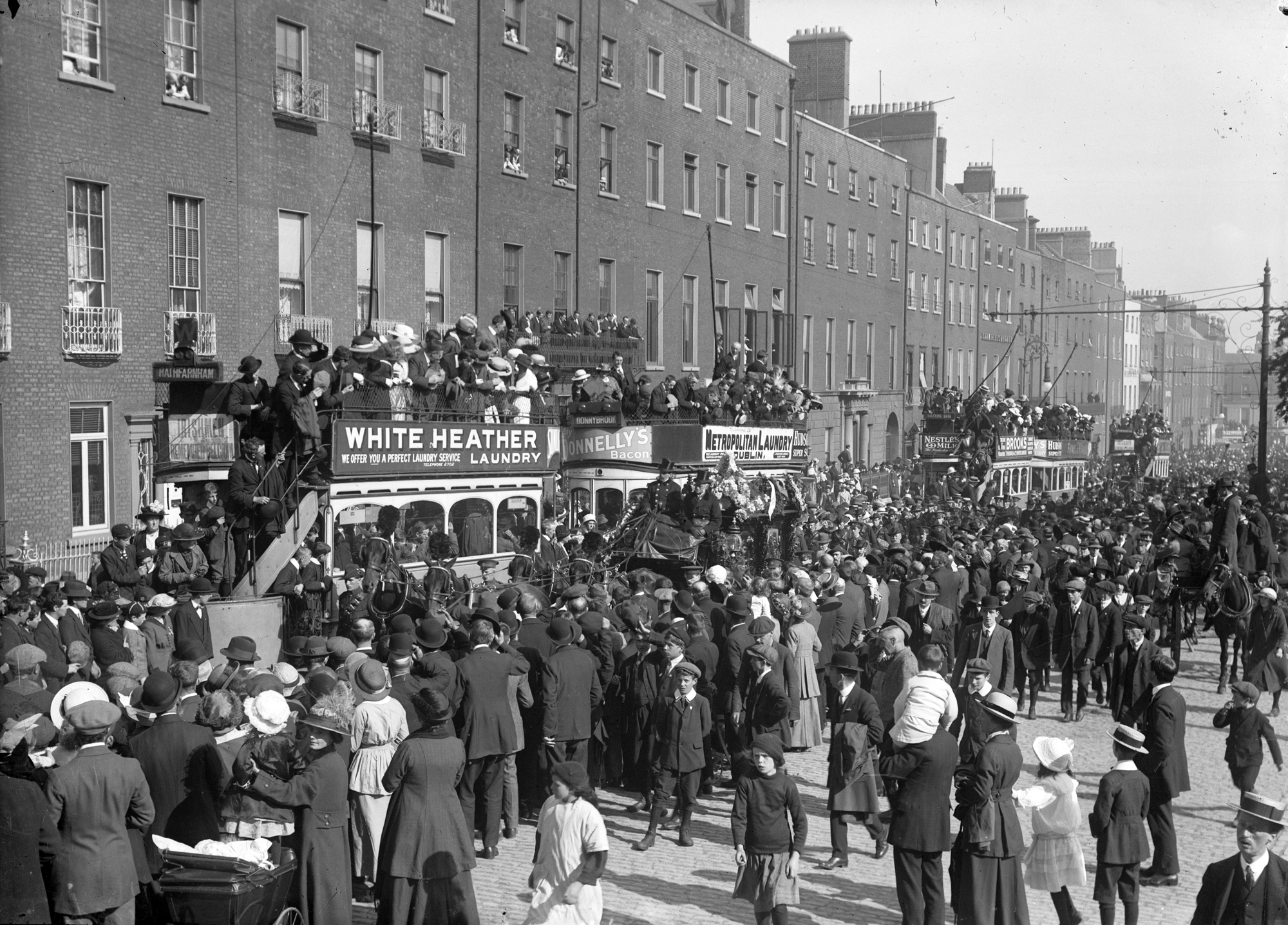
His funeral procession on 1 August 1915

Rossa was seriously ill in his later years; he suffered from senility, which caused him to relive his childhood and his years in prison. Rossa's final years saw him confined to a hospital bed in St. Vincent's Hospital, Staten Island, where he died at the age of 83.

The new republican movement in Ireland was quick to realise the propaganda value of the old Fenian's death, and Tom Clarke cabled to John Devoy the message: "Send his body home at once".

Against Rossa's wishes to be buried with his father and other victims of the Great Famine, his body was returned to Ireland for burial and a hero's welcome. In Dublin, 20,000 people formed his funeral cortege, with thousands lining the streets. The funeral at Glasnevin Cemetery on 1 August 1915 was a huge affair, garnering substantial publicity for the Irish Volunteers and the Irish Republican Brotherhood at a time when a rebellion (later to emerge as the Easter Rising) was being actively planned. The graveside oration, given by Patrick Pearse, remains one of the most famous speeches of the Irish independence movement, stirring his audience to a call to arms. It ended with the lines:

They think that they have pacified Ireland. They think that they have purchased half of us and intimidated the other half. They think that they have foreseen everything, think that they have provided against everything; but, the fools, the fools, the fools! – They have left us our Fenian dead, and while Ireland holds these graves, Ireland unfree shall never be at peace.

His grave was renovated in 1990 by the National Graves Association.

== Personal life ==
Rossa was married three times and had eighteen children. On 6 June 1853, he married Honora "Nora" Eager of Skibbereen, who had four sons (Denis, John, Cornelius Crom and Jeremiah). She died in 1860. In 1861 he married Ellen Buckley (Eileán Ní Bhuachalla) of Castlehaven; they had one son (Florence Stephens; later known as Timothy in the US); Buckley died in July 1863. In November 1864 he married, for the third time, to Mary Jane (Molly) Irwin of Clonakilty. They had thirteen children (James Maxwell, Kate Ellen, Francis Daniel, Maurice, Sheila Mary, Eileen Ellen, Amelia, Jeremiah, Isabella, Mary Jane, Margaret Mary Hamilton, Joseph Ivor and Alexander Aeneas).

The descendants of Jeremiah O'Donovan Rossa made their homes in Staten Island; they include writer William Rossa Cole and New York City Councillor Jerome X. O'Donovan. O'Dovonan Rossa's great-great-grandson is US international rugby union player John Quill.

== Legacy ==
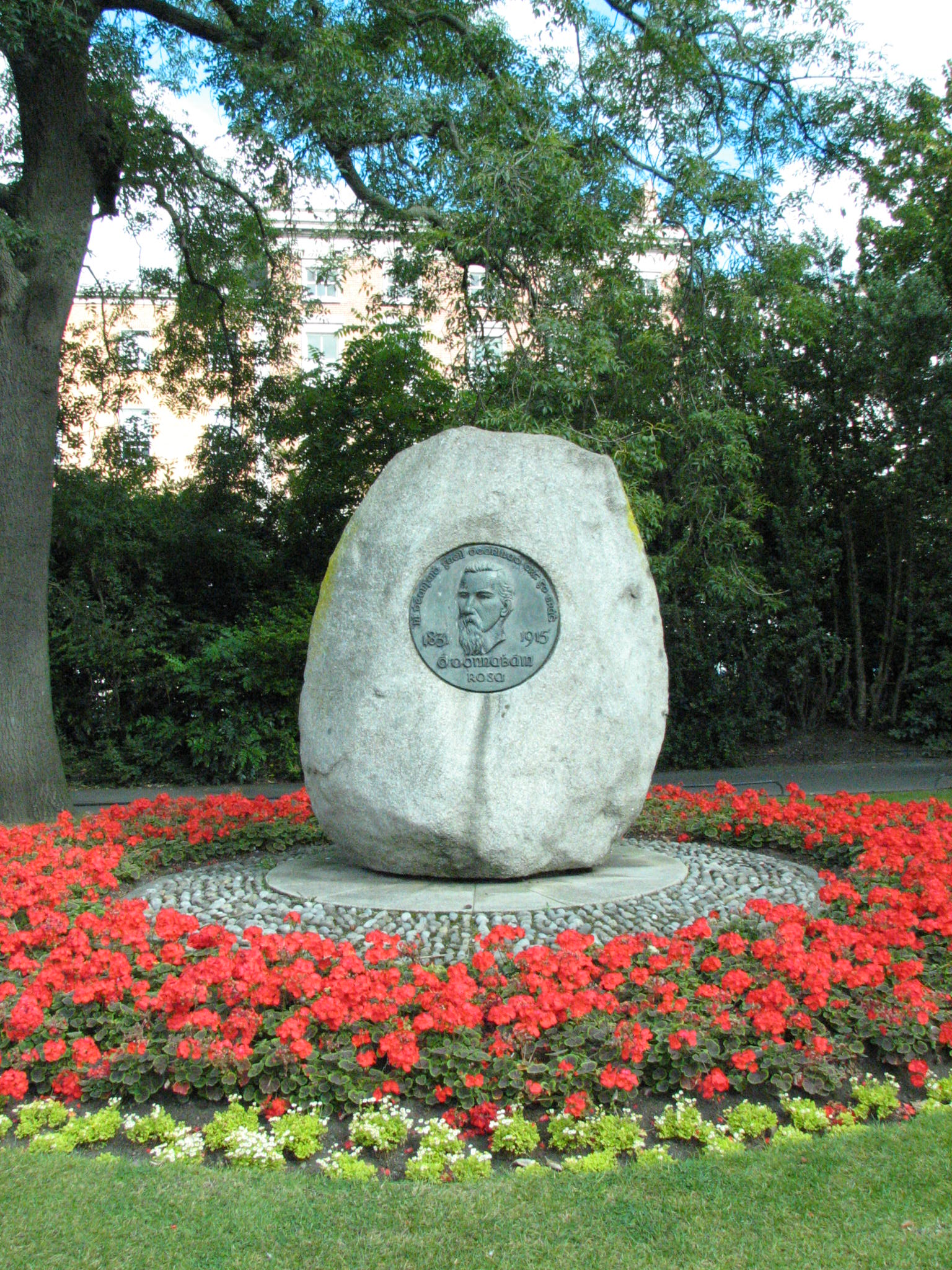
Monument to Jeremiah O'Donovan Rossa, in Dublin's St Stephen's Green

Gravestone in Glasnevin Cemetery

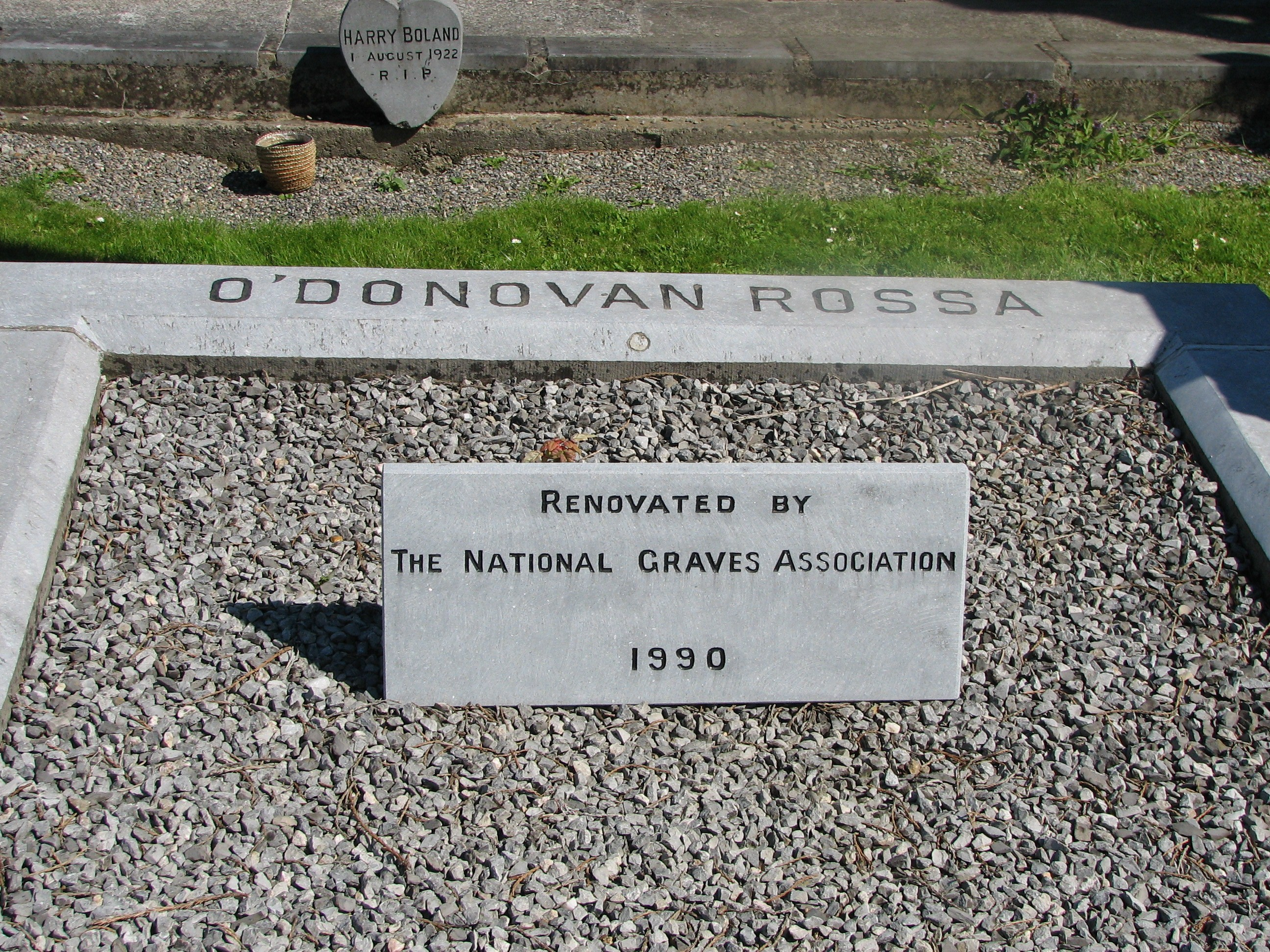
O'Donovan Rossa renovated 1990

Following Rossa's death, political rival Timothy Daniel Sullivan commented that "No more determined or consistent enemy to British rule ever breathed the air of Ireland", while Patrick Pearse praised Rossa as "the most typical" of Fenian leaders who derived "courage and endurance from the Gaelic tradition".

A memorial to Rossa stands in St. Stephen's Green, and a bridge over the River Liffey was renamed in his honour. A street in Cork City bears his name, as does a street in Thurles, County Tipperary – the constituency where he was elected. A park in Skibbereen is also named after him, as is the local Gaelic football team.

A memorial to Rossa stands in the village of Reenascreena, Rosscarbery, County Cork, where his descendants run the local village pub. The funeral casket that was used to ship him home is now on display next to the pub.

Other GAA teams throughout Ireland have also been named after him, including Ard Bó Uí Dhonnabhain Rossa in the Tyrone GAA, O'Donovan Rossa GAC in Belfast, Ó Donnabháin Rosa Magherafelt in the Derry GAA and Uí Donnabháin Rosa Mullach Breac in Armagh GAA, along with Ó Donnabháin Rosa est. in 2018 in Astoria, Queens, New York.

=== In popular culture ===
In James Joyce's "Araby," written between 1905 and 1907, the narrator is walking across Dublin when he hears "the nasal chanting of street-singers, who sang a come-all-you about O'Donovan Rossa".

Rossa appears as a character in Harry Harrison's alternate history Stars and Stripes trilogy.

== Works ==
- O'Donovan Rossa's Prison Life : Six Years in Six English Prisons (1874: New York)
- Rossa's Recollections. 1838 to 1898. (1898: New York).
- Irish Rebels in English Prisons : A Record of Prison Life (1899: New York)

Republications

- Rossa's Recollections 1838 to 1898: Memoirs of an Irish Revolutionary (Globe Pequot, 2004)

== See also ==
- Fenian Rising
- List of people on the postage stamps of Ireland
- O'Donovan family

Parliament of the United Kingdom
| Preceded by Charles William White; Charles Moore | Member of Parliament for County Tipperary; 1869–1870; With: Charles William White | Succeeded by Charles William White; Denis Caulfield Heron |
