= Charles Moore (Irish MP) =

Irish politician (1804–1869)

Charles Moore (1804 – 15 August 1869) was an Irish politician. He served in the British Parliament from 1865 to 1869 as Member of Parliament (MP) for County Tipperary.

== Biography ==
Charles Moore was born 17 June 1804 to Arthur and Mary O'Hara Moore of Crookedstone, County Antrim. He was a partner in the Liverpool merchant firm of Moore Brothers and Company.

He purchased Mooresfort in County Tipperary around 1852 and substantially remodelled the house, reducing it from a three stories to two. He was J.P. for that county. Moore's only known speech in the House of Commons was in a debate on the Habeas Corpus Suspension Bill.

He died 15 August 1869 at his home in Grafton Street.

== Family ==
On 12 January 1835 he married Marian Elizabeth Story of Liverpool. Their children were:

- Henry O'Hara
- Arthur John
- Marian Edith
- Helena Blanche, became a nun
- Laura Mary, married George Augustus Vaughn, partner in her father's firm, and nephew of John Vaughan, 3rd Earl of Lisburne

== Arms ==
Coat of arms of Charles Moore

Notes
Granted 11 November 1856 by Sir John Bernard Burke, Ulster King of Arms.
Crest
Out of a mural crown Proper a Moor's head also Proper wreathed about the temples Argent and Azure and charged on the neck with a rose Gules barbed Vert.
Escutcheon
Azyre on a chief engrailed Or a rose Gules barbed and seeded Proper between two mullets pierced of the third.
Motto
Cedere Non Potest

Parliament of the United Kingdom
Preceded by Laurence Waldron; Daniel O'Donoghue	Member of Parliament for County Tipperary; 1865 – 1869; With: Francis Scully 1865; Laurence Waldron 1865–1869	Succeeded by Charles William White; Jeremiah O'Donovan Rossa
