= Cave-Browne-Cave =

Cave-Browne-Cave is a surname. Notable people with the surname include:

- Any one of the Cave-Browne-Cave baronets
- Beatrice Mabel Cave-Browne-Cave, English mathematician and sister of Frances
- Frances Cave-Browne-Cave, English mathematician
- Genille Cave-Browne-Cave, 12th baronet
- Henry Cave-Browne-Cave, RAF officer
