= Sarah Otway-Cave, 3rd Baroness Braye =

English noblewoman

Sarah Otway-Cave, 3rd Baroness Braye (2 July 1768 – 21 February 1862) was an English noblewoman. The title of Baron Braye, originally created in 1529 for her ancestor Edmund Braye, 1st Baron Braye and abeyant since the death of the second baron in 1557, was called out of abeyance in her favor in 1839.

== Family ==
She was born Sarah Cave, only daughter of Sir Thomas Cave, 6th Baronet of Stanford and his wife Sarah Edwards. Her brother was Sir Thomas Cave, 7th Baronet, who died without issue in 1792. After her brother's death, she inherited the manor of Stanford, but not the baronetcy (which passed through the male line).

== Marriage and children ==
She married Henry Otway, of Castle Otway, brother of Admiral Sir Robert Otway, 1st Baronet. They had five children:

- Robert Otway-Cave (1796–1844)
- Maria Otway-Cave (died 1879)
- Anne Otway-Cave (died 1871)
- Catherine Otway-Cave (died 1875)
- Henrietta Otway-Cave (1809–1879)

Her husband died in 1815. In 1818, she and her children were granted a license to use the surname of Otway-Cave.

== Braye peerage case ==
Otway-Cave was one of the coheirs of the barony of Braye, which had been abeyant since the death of the second Baron Braye in 1557. The second baron, who had no children, was the only son of the first baron, so the title fell into abeyance among his six sisters and their heirs. Otway-Cave was the sole heir of the second sister, Elizabeth, who had married Sir Ralph Verney of Middle Claydon.

In 1835, Otway-Cave petitioned that the title of Baron Braye be called out of abeyance in her favor. Though her claim was contested by several other potential coheirs, the case was ultimately decided in her favor several years later. In 1839, letters patent were issued by Queen Victoria ending the abeyance of the Braye peerage, at which point Otway-Cave became Baroness Braye.

== Stuart collections ==
Otway-Cave acquired a significant collection of Jacobite materials. After the death of Henry Benedict Stuart (known to Jacobites as Henry IX), she purchased a number of Stuart portraits which he had left to a member of the Malatesta family. Most of the portraits remain at the family seat at Stanford. She also acquired a large body of Stuart papers, many of which were later transferred to the British Museum.

== Death and succession ==
Otway-Cave died in 1862 and was buried at Stanford on Avon. Her only son, Robert, had predeceased her in 1844, with no children of his own. As a result, the barony fell once again into abeyance until 1879, when it was called out of abeyance for her youngest daughter Henrietta.

Peerage of England
| Preceded by John Braye; Abeyant 1557 until 1839 | Baron Braye; 1839–1862 | Succeeded by Abeyant; Abeyance terminated 1879 in favor of Henrietta Wyatt-Edgell |
