= Caesar Otway =

Irish clergyman and author

- Born: 1780
- Died: 1842 (aged 61–62)
- Education: Trinity College Dublin
- Occupations: Priest, writer

Caesar Otway (1780–1842) was an Irish writer and clergyman who wanted to study and improve the condition of the poor.

== Life ==
Caesar Otway was born at Castle Otway near Nenagh, County Tipperary, Ireland. His parents were Cooke and Elizabeth Otway and his elder brothers included Admiral Robert Otway and Loftus who became a general. Cooke had been an officer in the Irish Volunteers militia.

Otway matriculated at Trinity College, Dublin, on 6 December 1796, being then 16 years old, and graduated B.A. in 1801. He took holy orders in the Church of Ireland in 1810. He worked as a parish priest for 17 years, before becoming assistant chaplain at the Magdalen Asylum, Leeson Street in Dublin.

Otway was involved in the establishment of a number of journals. With Joseph Henderson Singer, he started, in 1825, the Christian Examiner, the first Irish religious magazine for Anglicans. He was a good friend of the writer William Carleton, who first made his mark in the Examiner. He co-operated with George Petrie in the first volume of the Dublin Penny Journal, where he wrote under the pseudonym "Terence O'Toole." He was also a contributor to the Dublin University Magazine.

Otway died on 16 March 1842 in Dublin, at the age of 63.

== Works ==
Otway is best remembered as a writer of Irish tales. His writings, which display humour and sympathy with the poorer classes in Ireland, include Sketches in Ireland (1827), Sketches in Erris and Tyrawley and A Tour in Connaught (1839). Other works were:

- A Letter the Roman Catholic Priests of Ireland, 1814, as "C. O."
- A Lecture on Miracles...with Appendices, 1823.
- The Intellectuality of Domestic Animals, 1817.

== Family ==
In 1803 Otway married Frances Hastings with whom he had five children: John Hastings Otway, Caesar George Otway, Loftus Otway, Jane Otway and Frances Otway. After Frances died in 1833, he remarried on 17 January 1837; his second wife was Elizabeth la Touche, daughter of James Digges la Touche of Dublin,
