= Castle Otway =

Castle in Ireland

Coordinates: 52.77926°N 8.08151°W

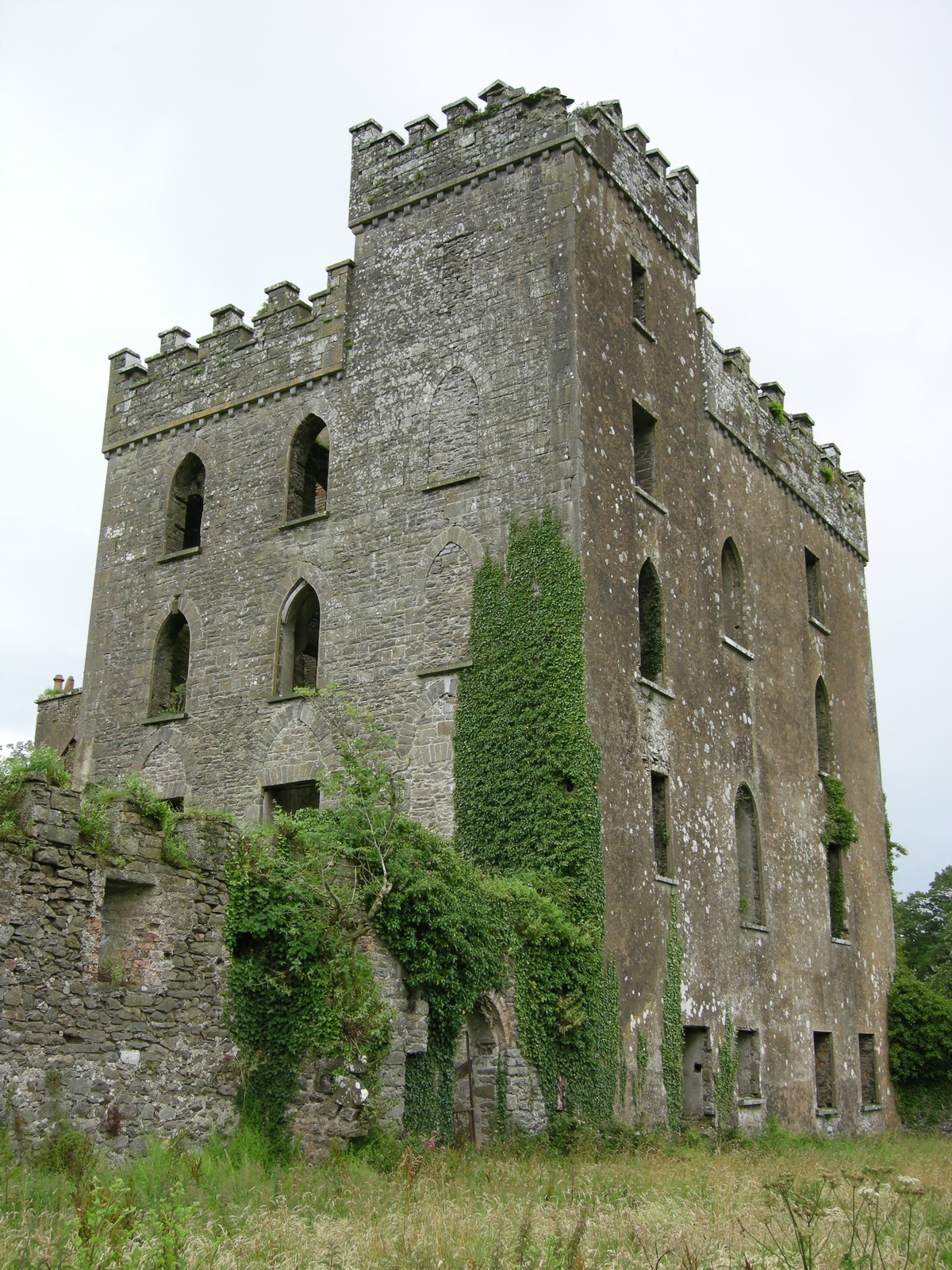
Castle Otway tower

Castle Otway is a former 18th-century country house which stood on a hill on the outskirts of Templederry, near Nenagh in County Tipperary, Ireland.

The house was built in stone up against the ruins of Cloghane Castle in two storeys with a 7-bay frontage, of which the middle three were pedimented. In the 19th century a tower house was attached at the rear based on the ruins of the castle keep. The house was burnt down in 1922 during the Civil War, probably by anti-Treaty Republicans. It now stands as a derelict ruin with the gardens and estate land used for farming.

== History ==
The castle and surrounding land were granted to John Otway in 1685. His descendants included Admiral Sir Robert Otway, 1st Bt., General Sir Loftus William Otway, the author Caesar Otway, and the noted medievalist Annette Jocelyn Otway-Ruthven.

Henry Otway (1768–1815) came to own the castle. He married Sarah Cave of Stanford Hall, Leicestershire, who became Baroness Braye in her own right. After Henry's death both the Baroness and their son Robert adopted the surname Otway-Cave and the property passed to Robert. He died young in 1844 with no children and the house was inherited by a cousin, Vice-Admiral Robert Jocelyn Otway. On the latter's death in 1884 it passed to his Galway-born son-in-law William Clifford Bermingham Ruthven, who adopted the surname Otway-Ruthven. The castle at one time housed the Otway Harp, an ornate late 16th-century instrument which is now the property of Trinity College, Dublin.
