= Stretton en le Field =

Village in Leicestershire, England

Coordinates: 52.704°N 1.550°W

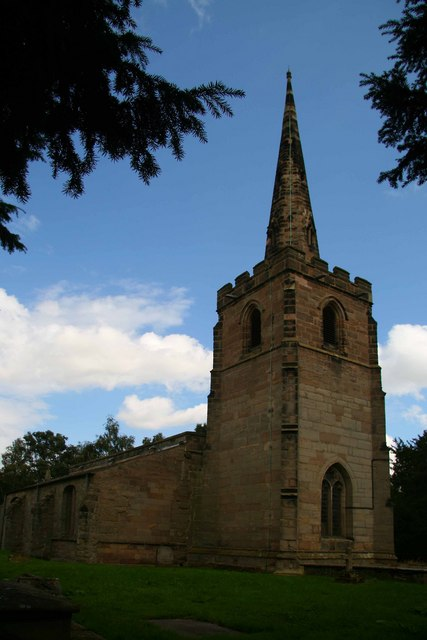
- Stretton Church is redundant

- Location within Leicestershire
- Population: 36 (2001)
- OS grid reference: SK304119
- Civil parish: Stretton en le Field
- District: North West Leicestershire
- Shire county: Leicestershire
- Region: East Midlands
- Country: England
- Sovereign state: United Kingdom
- Post town: Swadlincote
- Postcode district: DE12
- Dialling code: 01283
- Police: Leicestershire
- Fire: Leicestershire
- Ambulance: East Midlands
- UK Parliament: Hinckley and Bosworth

Stretton en le Field is a small village and civil parish in the North West Leicestershire district of Leicestershire, England, about 7 miles/11 km south-west of Ashby de la Zouch, historically an exclave of Derbyshire. According to the 2001 census, the parish had a population of 36. At the 2011 census the population remained under 100 and so was included in the civil parish of Chilcote. Stretton Bridge carries the A444 road across the River Mease, which forms the northern parish boundary. It is among the Thankful Villages, suffering no Great War fatalities in 1914–1918: eleven men went from the village to fight and all returned. The village is featured on Darren Hayman's album, Thankful Villages Volume 2.

== History ==
=== Roman origins ===
The name Stretton-en-le-Field is explained as a settlement ton/tun, lying in open country field/feld, by a Roman road stret/straet; with the influence of French on English history following the Norman Conquest having a clear impact on the village's current name.

Of the seventeen Strettons in England, all but two are situated on Roman Roads. However, the Roman road from which the village gains its name has not yet been positively identified. Evidence supports that both the A444 (Nuneaton–Burton Upon Trent) and the Tamworth Road (formerly the A453; Tamworth–Ashby de la Zouch) were used by the Romans. Although the A444 passes closest to the village, the straightness of Tamworth Road suggest it was the straet from which the village gained its name.

Remains of two Roman buildings have been found on the boundary between Stretton and neighbouring Appleby Magna. Archaeological excavations in advance of building a hotel at the M42/A444 junction revealed the remains of a 4th-century farm. Roman coins were found on the site from the reigns of Emperor Constantine I (307–337) and Emperor Magnentius (350–353), along with 4th-century pottery and roof-tiles. The farm buildings included a corn-drying oven, sunken buildings containing chaff from threshing and fragments of quern-stones. Other finds include a corroded iron knife-blade, copper alloy pins, an iron hobnail, and bones of cattle, sheep, pigs, dogs, cats and other animals. The site was destroyed by the construction of the Appleby Park Hotel; the hotel itself is now to be demolished to make way for the HS2 railway between Birmingham and Sheffield. The farm is thought to have sat adjacent to a Roman Villa; The Old Rectory, also in Appleby Magna, is thought to have been built on these remains. The adjacent Rectory Lane was previously known as The Golden Way Road, and before that as Goldherewey/Goldhordewe, referring to a hoard of Roman coins found there in medieval times.

=== Domesday Book ===
Although now in Leicestershire, Stretton was historically part of Derbyshire. The village has passed between the two several times and on occasions straddled the boundary. The Domesday Book has two listings for Stretton: one part in Leicestershire, one in Derbyshire, both belonging to Henry de Ferrers as tenant-in-chief.

The Leicestershire manor is listed as worth £0.1, with a taxable value of 3 geld units. The Lord is recorded as Roger of Livet (having previously been Aelfric of Bradbourne, Kari, and Leofnoth Sterre in 1066). The Derbyshire manor is the larger, and listed as containing a mill and 10 acres (40,000 m^{2}) of meadow, as the home of four households. The manor was valued at £0.8, with a taxable value of 1 geld unit; the Lord was also Roger of Livet (it had been Aelfric of Bradbourne in 1066).

=== Medieval history ===
St Michael's Church, built in the 14th century in an elevated position in the village, is now redundant, i. e. not used for regular services, but remains consecrated. It is Grade II* listed and maintained by the Churches Conservation Trust. It has historical value for having remained unchanged since medieval times, except for new box pews in the 18th century.

=== 19th century ===
The village used to be much larger than at present; a decline in population was recognized as early as the 1830s. In 1801 the village had a population of 212. By 1831 this had fallen to 109. In the 1891 census, the population had fallen further to 70. The village and parish (with outlying farms and houses) are estimated to have a current population of 36.

Earthworks near the church reveal the location of former buildings of the village, including Stretton Hall, once home to the Lord of the Manor.

In 1835 the parish extended to 1000 acres of what was described as "very rich land, mostly arable", and the village was described as "neat and pleasant". The lord of the manor was Sir John Robert Cave-Browne-Cave, 10th Baronet Cave-Browne-Cave (1798–1855), who lived in Stretton Hall, then described as "a handsome mansion [which] occupies a picturesque romantic situation, with fine views of the country around." By 1891 Stretton Hall had passed to Sir Myles Cave-Browne-Cave, 11th Baronet Cave-Browne-Cave (1822–1907), described as the principal parish landowner. Stretton Hall was seen as "an ancient mansion near the church and surrounded by a shrubbery". After Sir Myles's death, the title passed to his second son Genille (his eldest having died). Sir Genille Cave-Browne-Cave, 12th Baronet (1869–1929), before inheriting his father's title and fortune, had worked in America as a bartender and cowboy (using the assumed name "Mr. Harrison". The New York Times stated Sir Genille's inheritance was 6,000 acres; the article, however, seems inaccurate, calling Stretton Hall "a Norman Castle with accommodation for sixty guests, and a stable that quarters forty horses". After use in World War II to billet soldiers and then house Italian prisoners of war, Stretton Hall was demolished about 1945.

In 1897, Stretton en le Field was transferred from Derbyshire to Leicestershire; where it remains.
