= Gerald Livock =

English officer of the Royal Naval Air Service and Royal Air Force

Gerald Edward Livock
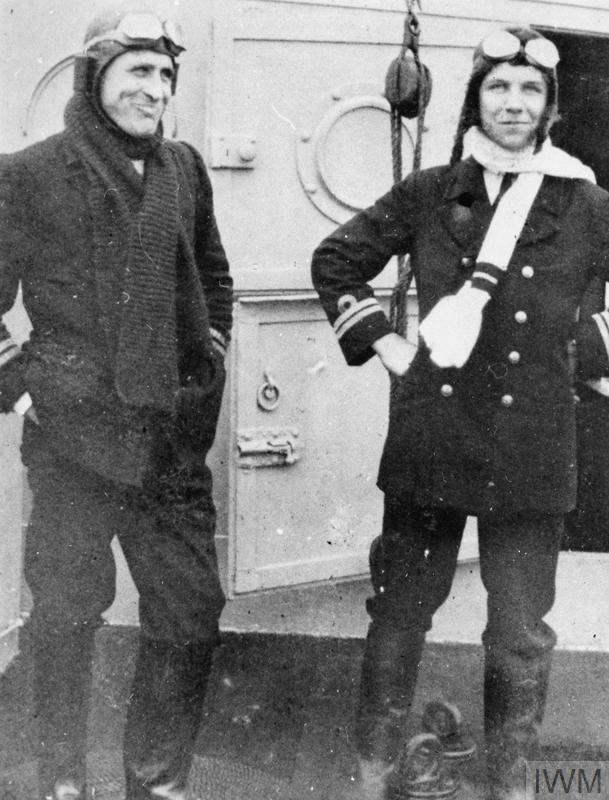
- Lieutenant Gerald Livock (right) with Frederick Rutland on HMS Engadine, 1916
- Born: 11 July 1897; Newmarket, Suffolk, England
- Died: 27 January 1989 (aged 91); Blandford Forum, Dorset, England
- Relatives: Michael Livock (nephew)
- Military career
- Allegiance: United Kingdom
- Branch: Royal Navy; Royal Air Force
- Service years: 1914–1945
- Rank: Group Captain
- Units: HMS Engadine; No. 73 Wing RAF; No. 230 Squadron RAF; HMS Pegasus; No. 24 Squadron RAF; RAF Far East Flight
- Commands: No. 205 Squadron RAF; No. 209 Squadron RAF; No. 10 Flying Training School, RAF Ternhill; RAF Kalafrana, Malta
- Conflicts: World War I North Russia intervention World War II
- Awards: Distinguished Flying Cross; Air Force Cross
- Cricket career

Cricket information
- Batting: Right-handed
- Role: Wicket-keeper

Domestic team information
- Years: Team
- 1923: Lord Cowdray's XI
- 1925–1926: LH Tennyson's XI
- 1925–1927: Middlesex
- 1925–1934: Gentlemen of England
- 1927–1932: Royal Air Force
- 1933: Marylebone Cricket Club (MCC)
- First-class debut: 22 September 1923 Lord Cowdray's XI v Rest of England
- Last First-class: 16 June 1934 Gentlemen of England v Australia

Career statistics
Competition	First-class
Matches	13
Runs scored	403
Batting average	25.18
100s/50s	0/2
Top score	65
Balls bowled	0
Wickets	-
Bowling average	-
5 wickets in innings	-
10 wickets in match	-
Best bowling	-
Catches/stumpings	19/6
- Source: CricketArchive, 15 December 2007

Group Captain Gerald Edward Livock DFC, AFC (11 July 1897 – 27 January 1989) was an English officer of the Royal Naval Air Service and Royal Air Force, who served from the beginning the First World War until the end of Second, and was also an archaeologist and cricketer. A right-handed batsman and wicket-keeper, he played first-class cricket for various teams between 1923 and 1934.

== Early life and background ==
Livock was born in Newmarket, Suffolk, the son of a veterinary surgeon, and was educated at Cheltenham School. He had just turned 17 when the First World War broke out in August 1914, and his father was keen for his son to join him in his practice. However, young Livock had other ideas, and on 27 October 1914 he was commissioned into the Royal Naval Air Service as a probationary flight sub-lieutenant, and was posted to HMS Pembroke, for duty with the RNAS at Hendon. There, at the Grahame-White School, he learned to fly the Grahame-White Type XV biplane, and on 20 December 1914 was granted Royal Aero Club Aviators' Certificate No. 1004.

== World War I and Russia ==
Livock was confirmed in his rank on 27 March 1915, and posted to HMS President, before finally seeing active service aboard the seaplane tender HMS Engadine, based at Rosyth, flying seaplanes on reconnaissance patrols over the North Sea. On 28 June 1915 he was promoted to flight lieutenant. He was still at Rosyth during the Battle of Jutland on 31 May 1916, but was afterwards posted to RNAS Great Yarmouth to pilot flying boats. On 30 June 1917 he was promoted to flight commander, and received a mention in despatches on 1 October.

On 1 April 1918, the Royal Naval Air Service (RNAS) was merged with the Army's Royal Flying Corps to form the Royal Air Force, and the naval units at Great Yarmouth became No. 73 Wing RAF, in which Livock served alongside Egbert Cadbury and Robert Leckie. Livock was promoted to the temporary rank of major on 23 July 1918, and on 20 September was awarded the Distinguished Flying Cross. His citation read:

Captain (Temporary Major) Gerald Edward Livock (Sea Patrol).

Has rendered valuable services on numerous occasions on reconnaissance patrols in enemy waters, in attacks on hostile seaplanes, and in connection with anti-submarine patrol work.

On 1 January 1919 Livock received his second mention in despatches "for distinguished service in war areas". He was then attached to the North Russia Relief Force, flying seaplanes from a base on Lake Onega, during the Russian Civil War, and was again appointed a temporary major between 1 May and 29 June 1919.

== Inter-war career ==
Livock was granted a permanent commission in the RAF on 1 August 1919, with the rank of captain, and received his third mention in despatches "for distinguished services overseas" in December 1919. He served at the Headquarters of No. 10 Group (Coastal Area) until posted to No. 230 Squadron on 15 September 1921, then on 4 May 1922 he was transferred to the Marine Armament Experimental Establishment. Livock was transferred to the Care and Maintenance Party at RAF Cattewater on 7 January 1924, then on 21 March to the aircraft/seaplane carrier HMS Pegasus. On 1 May 1925 he was posted to No. 24 Squadron, a VIP transport squadron based at RAF Kenley, where he was promoted to squadron leader on 1 July. Livock returned to the Marine Aircraft Experimental Establishment at Felixstowe on 14 September 1925.

He was then involved in two long-distance flying boat flights; on 1 July 1926 two Supermarine Southamptons under Livock's command took off from RAF Cattewater, Plymouth, on a flight to Egypt, via Hourtin and Berre in France, then Naples, Valletta, Benghazi and Sollum, arriving at Aboukir on 10 July. From there they flew to Famagusta, Cyprus, via Haifa, and back. On 18 July they left Aboukir, making the return journey via Suda Bay, Corfu and Malta, Italy and France, arriving back at Cattewater on 30 July, having flown 6,000 nautical miles (11,000 km; 6,900 mi). The purpose of the flight was to show that the aircraft were capable of extended operations independent of bases or a parent ship. It also tested the reliability of wireless communications, with both aircraft being in constant communication with land stations for the exchange of location and weather information. On 19 April 1927 Livock was posted to Headquarters, Coastal Area, and on 17 May to the Far East Flight, based at Felixstowe. Livock was sent out to reconnoitre suitable landing places between India and Australia for another long-distance flight, returning to England in September 1927. On 17 October 1927 four Supermarine Southamptons set off from Cattewater. The flight was under the command of Group Captain Henry Cave-Browne-Cave, with Livock as his second-in-command. The aircraft had been fitted with anodized Duralumin hulls and Leitner-Watts steel propellers, rather than the wooden ones of the standard aircraft. They were also fitted with cooking and sleeping facilities inside, and also carried hammocks and awnings for use in tropical climates. They followed the course of the 1926 flight to Egypt, then across Iraq to the Persian Gulf, and followed the northern coast of the Indian Ocean to Karachi, around the coast of India to Ceylon, and around the Bay of Bengal to Burma, and down the Malay Peninsula, finally arriving at Singapore on 28 February. The flight left Singapore on 21 May, flying via Batavia and Surabaya to Kupang in Timor from where on 1 June 1928 they flew to Broome, Western Australia. From there they flew around the coast, accompanied by Wing Commander Lawrence Wackett, RAAF, in his Wackett Widgeon II, to Perth, and then circumnavigated the entire continent via Adelaide, Melbourne, Sydney, Brisbane, and Darwin, before arriving back in Singapore on 15 September. An additional flight was then made, calling at Kuching, Manila, and Hong Kong, returning to Singapore via Tourane and Penang. On 1 March 1929 Livock was awarded the Air Force Cross. The flight remained at Singapore, based at RAF Seletar where it became No. 205 (Flying Boat) Squadron, under the command of Cave-Browne-Cave until 1 January 1930, when Livock took over as Officer Commanding.

Livock eventually returned to England, being posted to the Central Flying School at RAF Wittering on 19 February 1932, also finally receiving his Air Force Cross from the King at Buckingham Palace on 23 February. Livock was promoted to wing commander on 1 July 1933, leaving Wittering on 12 August, and being posted to the Air Staff at Cranwell on 23 October. He was appointed commander of No. 209 (Flying Boat) Squadron, based at RAF Mount Batten on 17 May 1934. In mid-September an attempted flight from Mount Batten to Greenland by two Blackburn Perth flying boats, commanded by Livock, was abandoned after reaching the Faroe Islands because of icing. Livock left No. 209 Squadron in January 1936 to attend a course at the Royal Naval Staff College, Greenwich, until December. On 2 January 1937 he was posted to the Headquarters of No. 16 (Reconnaissance) Group for staff duties, then took command of No. 10 Flying Training School at RAF Ternhill on 30 November, receiving promotion to group captain on 1 January 1938.

== World War II and after ==
Livock served throughout the Second World War, being appointed Commanding Officer of RAF Kalafrana, Malta, on 5 January 1941. He retired on 24 June 1945, and became the headmaster of a boy's preparatory school.

Group Captain Livock died in Blandford Forum, Dorset, on 27 January 1989.

== Personal life and other interests ==
Livock married Florance Smith in Kensington in September 1921. Their son, Pilot Officer William Denzil Livock, RAFVR, was killed in action on 21 December 1944, aged 20, while serving in No. 248 Squadron RAF.

Livock had a keen interest in archaeology, carrying out aerial surveys during the 1930s, and was a longstanding member of the Suffolk Institute of Archaeology.

In September 1973 Livock published a memoir To the Ends of the Air.

== Cricketing career ==
After playing some Minor Counties Championship matches for Cambridgeshire in 1921, Livock made his first-class debut for Lord Cowdray's XI against the Rest of England in 1923. In 1924 he played for the Straits Settlements against the Federated Malay States, also playing for the combined Malaya cricket team in matches against Shanghai and Hong Kong. Returning to English cricket, he played three County Championship matches for Middlesex in 1925, also playing in that season's Gentlemen v Players match. He next played for Middlesex in 1927, his top-level cricket career being restricted by his RAF career, when he played against Warwickshire and New Zealand. He also played a first-class match for the RAF against the Royal Navy that season. Following a second match for the Straits Settlements against the Federated Malay States in 1930, he played three more first-class matches; for the RAF against the Army in 1932, for the Marylebone Cricket Club (MCC) against Yorkshire in 1933 and for the Gentlemen of England against Australia in 1934. He also played cricket in Egypt that year.
