= Otway baronets =

Extinct baronetcy in the Baronetage of the United Kingdom

The Otway baronetcy, of Brighthelmstone in the County of Sussex, was a title in the Baronetage of the United Kingdom. It was created 30 September 1831 for Admiral Robert Otway, in honour of his service in the Napoleonic Wars and off the Brazilian Coast.

Since his two eldest sons had predeceased him in naval service, the baronetcy passed to his third son George Otway, the 2nd Baronet, on his death in 1846. After George Otway's death the baronetcy passed to his brother Arthur Otway, the 3rd Baronet and fourth son of Admiral Robert Otway. He was a barrister and politician and served under William Gladstone as Under-Secretary of State for Foreign Affairs between 1868 and 1871. He had no surviving male issue and the title became extinct on his death in 1912.

== Otway baronets, of Brighthelmstone (1831) ==
- Sir Robert Waller Otway, 1st Baronet (1772–1846)
- Sir George Graham Otway, 2nd Baronet (1816–1881)
- Sir Arthur John Otway, 3rd Baronet (1822–1912)

Coat of arms of Otway of Brighthelmstone
Coronet Si Deus nobiscum quis contra nos (If God be with us, who can be against us?) Crest Out of a ducal coronet Or a cross calvary also Or, between two wings Sable. Escutcheon Argent, a pile Sable, over all a chevron counterchanged, on a chief Azure an anchor erect encircled by a wreath of laurel Or, between, on the dexter, a demi-Neptune Proper, issuant out of a naval crown gold, and on the sinister a mermaid Proper Supporters On either side a triton blowing his shell Proper, crowned with a naval crown Or, across the shoulder a wreath of Red coral and holding in the exterior hand a trident, the point downwards Sable.

== Extended family ==
General Sir Loftus Otway was the younger brother of the 1st Baronet.

== Notes ==
Baronetage of the United Kingdom
Preceded by Nugent baronets	Otway baronets of Brighthelmstone; 30 September 1831	Succeeded by Rashleigh baronets
