= Cave-Browne-Cave baronets =

Title in the Baronetage of England

Escutcheon of the Cave-Browne-Cave baronets of Stanford

The Cave, later Cave-Browne, later Cave-Browne-Cave Baronetcy, of Stanford in the County of Northampton, is a title in the Baronetage of England.

== Origin ==
It was created on 30 June 1641 for Thomas Cave, a Royalist who fought in the English Civil War. Granted lands in South and North Cave in Yorkshire by William the Conqueror, by the fifteenth century the Caves had moved to Stanford on the boundary of Northamptonshire and Leicestershire to become "a wealthy and powerful clan, foremost among the new men of the age, the nouveaux riches, the shrewd, rapacious, grasping gentry raised up by the Tudor dynasty". Sir Thomas's aunt Eleanor was married to the diplomat Sir Thomas Roe; his great-grandmother, Margaret, was a sister of William Cecil, 1st Baron Burghley, Queen Elizabeth I's Lord High Treasurer; and her husband Roger's uncle Sir Ambrose Cave was Chancellor of the Duchy of Lancaster under Elizabeth. Roger Cave and Margaret had several daughters including Elizabeth who married Walter Bagot of Blithfield Hall in Staffordshire, their son Hervey Bagot being created a baronet by King Charles I; Margaret (1565–1594) who married William Skipwith; and Dorothy who married Thomas Hartopp of Freeby in Leicestershire.

== Descendants ==
Sir Thomas Cave's son, the second Baronet, was Member of Parliament for Coventry. His son, the third Baronet, was Member of Parliament for Leicestershire. He married the Hon. Margaret, daughter of John Verney, 1st Viscount Fermanagh, and a descendant of Edmund Braye, 1st Baron Braye. Their elder son, the fourth Baronet, died unmarried in 1734 and the baronetcy devolved on his younger brother, who also sat as Member of Parliament for Leicestershire. His elder son, the sixth Baronet, was a Fellow of the Royal Society and High Sheriff of Leicestershire. His son, the seventh Baronet, sat briefly as Member of Parliament for Leicestershire but died childless at an early age. His sister Sarah Otway, the sixth Baronet's only daughter, then inherited the family seat of Stanford Hall, Leicestershire, and in 1839 became the third Baroness Braye when the abeyance of the barony of Braye was terminated in her favour (see the Baron Braye for further history of this branch of the family). The seventh Baronet was succeeded by his uncle, the eighth Baronet. He was an unmarried clergyman and on his death in 1810 the line of the third Baronet failed.

The late Baronet was succeeded by his second cousin, William Cave-Browne, the ninth Baronet. He was the son of John Cave-Browne (who in 1752 had assumed the additional surname of Browne by Act of Parliament), son of Roger Cave, eldest son of the second marriage of the second Baronet, by his wife Catherine, daughter of William Browne of Stretton en le Field in Derbyshire. In 1839 the ninth Baronet's assumption of the additional surname of Cave was confirmed by royal licence. He was succeeded by his son, the tenth Baronet. He was High Sheriff of Derbyshire in 1844. His son, the eleventh Baronet, was a Deputy Lieutenant and Justice of the Peace for Derbyshire. He was succeeded by his second but only surviving son, the twelfth Baronet. He was initially a soldier and fought in the Boxer Rebellion and First World War, but was later ordained. He died childless and was succeeded by his first cousin, the eldest surviving son of the thirteen children of Ambrose Syned Cave-Browne-Cave, younger son of the tenth Baronet. A Captain in the Royal Navy who had served at the bombardment of Alexandria in 1882, the thirteenth Baronet was childless and was succeeded by his younger brother, the fourteenth Baronet. He died in 1943 without surviving male issue and was succeeded by his nephew, the fifteenth Baronet. He was the son of Edward Lambert Cave-Browne-Cave, the fifth son of the aforementioned Ambrose Syned Cave-Browne-Cave. The title is now held by the fifteenth Baronet's grandson, the seventeenth Baronet, who succeeded his father, the sixteenth Baronet, upon the latter's death in 2011.

=== Extended family ===
Edward Raban Cave-Brown (1835–1907), son of Lieutenant-Colonel Edward Cave-Browne, younger brother of the ninth Baronet, was Accountant-General in the India Office from 1893 to 1901 and his son William Cave-Browne (1884–1967) was a Major-General in the Royal Engineers; his grandson John Raban Cave-Browne (1917–1989) was a Brigadier in the Royal Engineers. Sir Thomas Cave-Browne-Cave (1835–1924), third son of Thomas Cave-Browne-Cave, third son of the ninth Baronet, was Deputy Accountant-General of the Army from 1897 to 1900 and a Commissioner of the Royal Hospital Chelsea from 1899 to 1923. His daughters Frances Cave-Browne-Cave and Beatrice Mabel Cave-Browne-Cave, were mathematicians; his older son, Thomas Reginald Cave-Browne-Cave (1885–1969), was Professor of Engineering at University College, Southampton, from 1931 to 1950 and Director of Camouflage at the Ministry of Home Security from 1941 to 1945; and his younger son, Henry Meyrick Cave-Browne-Cave, was an Air Vice-Marshal in the Royal Air Force. Paul Cave (Paul Astley Cave-Browne-Cave) (1917–2010), the eldest great-grandson of the Rev. William Astley Cave-Browne-Cave, the second son of the ninth Baronet, published and edited Hampshire, The County Magazine for over four decades until 2007. A former Fleet Street journalist with the News Chronicle and the Daily Mirror, he was also a theatrical agent who managed the singer Frankie Vaughan for some years. Paul's brother Anthony Cave-Browne-Cave (1925–2011) was awarded the DSO for distinguishing himself in battle against the Japanese in Burma during World War II when still only in his teens. Phebe Hyacinth Cave-Browne-Cave (1901–80), MBE, the only child of the fourteenth Baronet, was a Church Mission Society missionary in northern Uganda for over half a century until her death.

== Cave, later Cave-Browne, later Cave-Browne-Cave baronets, of Stanford (1641) ==
- Sir Thomas Cave, 1st Baronet (c. 1622–c.1671)
- Sir Roger Cave, 2nd Baronet (1655–1703), son of the 1st Baronet
- Sir Thomas Cave, 3rd Baronet (1681–1719), son of the 2nd Baronet
- Sir Verney Cave, 4th Baronet (1705–1734), elder son of the 3rd Baronet
- Sir Thomas Cave, 5th Baronet (1712–1778), younger son of the 3rd Baronet
- Sir Thomas Cave, 6th Baronet (1737–1780), elder son of the 5th Baronet
- Sir Thomas Cave, 7th Baronet (1766–1792), son of the 6th Baronet
- The Reverend Sir Charles Cave, 8th Baronet (c. 1747–1810), younger son of the 5th Baronet
- Sir William Cave-Browne-Cave, 9th Baronet (1765–1838), great-grandson of the 2nd Baronet
- Sir John Robert Cave-Browne-Cave, 10th Baronet (1798–1855), son of the 9th Baronet
- Sir Mylles Cave-Browne-Cave, 11th Baronet (1822–1907), son of the 10th Baronet
- Sir Genille Cave-Browne-Cave, 12th Baronet (1869–1929), son of the 11th Baronet
- Sir Reginald Ambrose Cave-Browne-Cave, 13th Baronet (1860–1930), grandson of the 10th Baronet
- Sir Rowland Henry Cave-Browne-Cave, 14th Baronet (1865–1943), grandson of the 10th Baronet
- Sir Clement Charles Cave-Browne-Cave, 15th Baronet (1896–1945), great-grandson of the 10th Baronet
- Sir Robert Cave-Browne-Cave, 16th Baronet (1929–2011), son of the 15th Baronet
- Sir John Robert Charles Cave-Browne-Cave, 17th Baronet (born 1957), son of the 16th Baronet, in Canada.

== See also ==
- Baron Braye
- Stanford Hall
