= Nicholas Maher =

Irish politician (died 1851)

Member of Parliament for County Tipperary
- In office 10 February 1844 – 18 October 1851 Serving with Robert Otway-Cave (1844–1845); Richard Albert Fitzgerald (1845–1847); Francis Scully (1847–1851)
- Preceded by: Robert Otway-Cave; Valentine Maher
- Succeeded by: Francis Scully; James Sadleir

Personal details
- Died: 18 October 1851
- Party: Repeal Association

Nicholas Valentine Maher (died 18 October 1851) was an Irish Repeal Association politician.

He was the son of Thomas Maher, a medical practitioner, and his wife Margaret. In 1845, he married Margaret Jane Herbert, the daughter of Walter Otway Herbert and Mary Miles.

Maher was first elected Repeal Association MP for County Tipperary at a by-election in 1844—caused by the death of his cousin, Valentine Maher—and held the seat until his own death in 1851.

He was also a member of the Reform Club.

Parliament of the United Kingdom
Preceded by Robert Otway-Cave; Valentine Maher	Member of Parliament for County Tipperary; 1844–1851; With: Robert Otway-Cave (1844–1845); Richard Albert Fitzgerald (1845–1847); Francis Scully (1847–1851)	Succeeded by Francis Scully; James Sadleir
