= RAF Far East Flight =

The RAF Far East Flight, of the Royal Air Force (RAF), was a flying unit of four Supermarine Southampton II flying boats which undertook a long-range exploratory flight to Singapore, Australia and Hong Kong between October 1927 and January 1929. Having completed this journey the aircraft remained at Singapore and the Flight was redesignated No. 205 Squadron RAF, the first RAF unit to be permanently based there.

== Background and objectives ==
During the 1920s the RAF carried out a number of long-distance flights to explore air-routes and facilities and test the feasibility of long-range reinforcement of more distant parts of the British Empire. The RAF's first international long-range cruise by flying boats was to Egypt in July 1926. The success of that trip paved the way for subsequent longer journeys and the Far East Flight was formed to undertake a journey to Australia and the Far East starting in 1927. The project's publicised aims were to gain experience with the operation of flying boats independent of surface vessels and shore bases, gather information the suitability of locations along the route for flying boats, and to 'fly the flag'; fostering cooperation between Britain and her Empire.

The Flight covered approximately 23000 miles (37000 km) from Felixstowe to Singapore, around Australia and back to Singapore between 17 October 1927 and 18 September 1928. A further 4500 miles (7241 km) were flown on the final leg, a return trip from Singapore to Hong Kong in November and December 1928.

== Aircraft ==
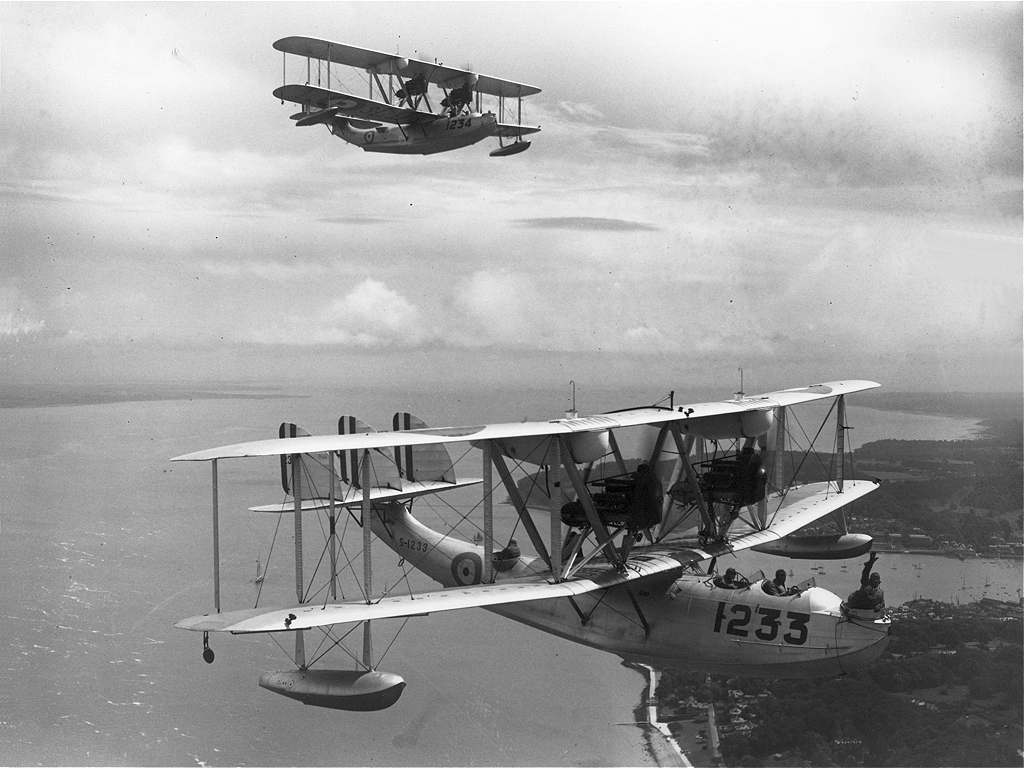
Supermarine Southampton flying boats

Five new metal-hulled Supermarine Southampton II flying boats were assigned to the Flight. Aircraft S1149, S1150, S1151 and S1152 were delivered to Felixstowe in September 1927, and these four competed the Felixstowe-Singapore-Australia-Singapore legs of the cruise. The fifth aircraft, S1127, was shipped as a spare to Singapore. This aircraft replaced S1149 for the final Singapore-Hong Kong leg on Air Ministry instructions.

The aircraft were prepared with a number of modifications from standard specification. Hulls and wingtip floats were finished with white enamel and larger engine radiators, oil tanks and top-plane fuel tanks were fitted. In addition, there were internal changes to provide more space and support facilities for the crew, who had to live on board for periods during the trip. Metal, instead of wooden, airscrews were fitted to the aircraft during the flight. Specially designed collapsible rubber dinghies were also carried. No automatic pilots or blind flying aids were fitted, and only two of the four aircraft had radio sets – communication between aircraft in the air being by lamp or hand-signals.

== Personnel ==
The Flight was commanded by Group Captain Henry M. Cave-Browne-Cave DSO DFC, appointed on 17 May 1927 . Cave-Browne-Cave captained S1152 and led the flight to Singapore, around Australia and back to Singapore. In August 1929 he took command of No. 205 Squadron formed from the redesignated Flight in Singapore.

The three other aircraft were captained by Squadron Leader G. E. Livock DFC (S1149 and Second-in-Command), Flight Lieutenant D. V. Carnegie AFC (S1150) and Flight Lieutenant C. G. Wigglesworth AFC (S1151). Sqdn Ldr Livock previously commanded the flying boat cruise to Egypt in 1926.

Other RAF air- and ground crew were:

- Flight Lieutenant S. T. Freeman, MBE
- Flight Lieutenant P. E. Maitland, AFC (S1149)
- Flight Lieutenant H. G. Sawyer AFC (S1152)
- Flying Officer B. Cheesman, MBE
- Flying Officer I. Horwood, MC
- Flying Officer G. E. Nicholetts (S1150)
- Flying Officer S. D. Scott (S1151)
- Flight Sergeant T. Parry AFM
- Flight Sergeant W. P. Spinks
- Sergeant W. Cushing
- Sergeant A. E. Nicol
- Sergeant J. R. Semple
- Corporal A. W. Brown
- Corporal J. A. Coyne
- Corporal A. H. Hart
- Corporal W. McMeeking
- Corporal W. Pullan
- Corporal J. R. Walker
- Corporal W. H. Wood
- Leading Aircraftman R. H. Abrook
- Leading Aircraftman A. W. Banner
- Leading Aircraftman F. J. Head
- Leading Aircraftman P. Hepple
- Leading Aircraftman R. Houstan
- Leading Aircraftman E. H. Myers
- Leading Aircraftman F. S. Nelson
- Leading Aircraftman J. E. Shelley
- Leading Aircraftman C. Way
- Leading Aircraftman J. Williams
- Leading Aircraftman F. E. Woods
- Aircraftman G. H. Bucknall
- Aircraftman S. W. Coates
- Aircraftman V. W. Lee
- Aircraftman J. I. Netley
- Aircraftman H. Rose
- Aircraftman C. Young

== Route ==
The flight was undertaken in four main sections:

- Section 1: Felixstowe-Karachi (14 October – 13 December 1927)
- Section 2: Karachi-Singapore (14 December 1927 – 20 May 1928)
- Section 3: Singapore-Australia-Singapore (21 May – 31 September 1928)
- Section 4: Singapore-Hong Kong-Singapore (1 November – 11 December 1928)

=== Section 1 ===
The flight departed Felixstowe on 14 October at 0900 to fly to Plymouth, leaving Plymouth three days later at 0900 on 17 October. From Plymouth, the route was south then southeast across France and Italy to Greece, and on to Egypt. From Egypt, northeast to Turkey then southeast across Iraq and east along the northern coast of The Gulf and Arabian Sea to Karachi. At Karachi the aircraft were overhauled, remaining there for three weeks.

Section stopping points and arrival dates:

- Plymouth, 14 October 1927
- Houtin (Bordeaux), 17 October
- Berre (Marseille), 19 October
- Naples, 21 October
- Brindisi, 25 October
- Athens, 28 October
- Aboukir, 29 October
- Alexandretta, 3 November
- Ramadi, 5 November
- Hinaidi, 6 November
- Basra, 10 November
- Bushire, 14 November
- Henjam, 14 November
- Gwadar, 16 November
- Karachi, 18 November

=== Section 2 ===
The second leg began on 18 December with departure of the Flight from Karachi at 0730. From there, the route was round the coast of India (now Pakistan and India) to Calcutta via Ceylon (now Sri Lanka) then southeast down the Burmese coast and Malay Peninsula to Singapore. Once again the aircraft were overhauled and prepared for the third leg of the trip, staying in Singapore a month.

Section stopping points and arrival dates:

- Bombay (now Mumbai), 26 December
- Mangalore, 27 December
- Cochin, 29 December
- Colombo, 31 December
- Trincomali, 12 January 1928
- Pulicat, 19 January
- Coconada, 20 January
- Chilka Lake, 23 January
- Calcutta, 27 January
- Akyab, 3 February
- Rangoon, 6 February
- Mergui, 13 February
- Penang, 16 February
- Port Swettenham, 23 February
- Singapore, 28 February

=== Section 3 ===
Take-off from Singapore was at 0555 on 21 May. The route followed was east along the north coast of Sumatra and the Javanese archipelago to Koepang (now Kupang, Indonesia) then south to Broome and a circumnavigation of Australia back to Koepang and returning to Singapore along the outward route. Back at Singapore the aircraft were serviced and readied for the final section.

Section stopping points and arrival dates:

- Klabat Bay, 21 May
- Batavia, 23 May
- Sourabaya, 25 May
- Bima, 28 May
- Koepang (now Kupang), 30 May
- Broome, 1 June
- Port Hedland, 3 June
- Carnarvon, 6 June
- Perth, 7 June
- Albany, 13 June
- Israelite Bay, 19 June
- Murat Bay, 20 June
- Adelaide, 22 June
- Melbourne, 29 June
- Paynesville, 30 July
- Sydney, 1 August
- Brisbane, 11 August
- Gladstone, 18 August
- Bowen, 19 August
- Cooktown, 24 August
- Thursday Island, 28 August
- Melville Bay, 29 August
- Port Darwin, 30 August
- Koepang (now Kupang), 1 September
- Bima, 3 September
- Sourabaya, 4 September
- Batavia, 9 September
- Klabat Bay, 14 September
- Singapore, 15 September

=== Section 4 ===
Starting on 1 November, this took the Flight along the north coast of Borneo to Manila, across the South China Sea to Hong Kong, returning to Singapore along the Vietnamese coast. Aircraft S1127 replaced S1149 for this section.

Stopping points on this section:

- Kuching
- Labuan
- Princessa
- Manila
- Salomague
- Hong-Kong
- Tourane
- C. St. Jacques
- Saigon
- Tachin
- Bangkok
- Victoria Point
- Penang
- Singapore

== Flight completion ==
Arrival back at Singapore on 11 December 1928 marked the end of the cruise. On 8 January 1929 the Flight was redesignated as No. 205 Squadron based at RAF Seletar in Singapore, with Group Captain Cave-Browne-Cave commanding the Squadron until 1930. The aircraft remained and were used until the Squadron re-equipped with Short Singapores in April 1935.
