= Cornelius O'Callaghan (1809–1849) =

Irish politician

Cornelius O'Callaghan (1809 – 16 August 1849) of Shanbally Castle, Clogheen, Co. Tipperary, was an Irish politician. He sat in the House of Commons of the United Kingdom as a Member of Parliament (MP) for County Tipperary from 1832 to 1835, and for Dungarvan from 1837 to 1841.

Shanbally Castle was built for his father, Cornelius O'Callaghan, 1st Viscount Lismore who outlived him, so his brother George inherited the title and estate.

Parliament of the United Kingdom
Preceded by Robert Otway-Cave; Thomas Wyse	Member of Parliament for County Tipperary; 1832–1835; With: Richard Lalor Sheil	Succeeded by Robert Otway-Cave; Richard Lalor Sheil
Preceded by John Power	Member of Parliament for Dungarvan; 1837–1841	Succeeded by Richard Lalor Sheil
