= John Braye, 2nd Baron Braye =

English nobleman (died 1557)

John Braye
- 2nd Baron Braye
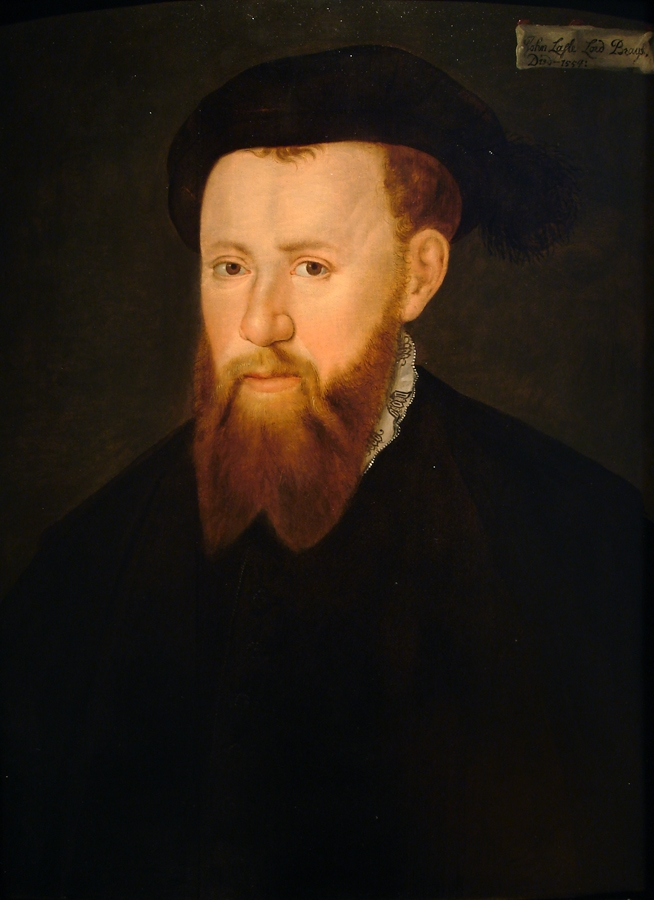
- Portrait of John Braye by an unknown artist
- Died: 19 November 1557; London, England
- Noble family: Braye
- Spouse: Anne Talbot
- Father: Edmund Braye, 1st Baron Braye
- Mother: Jane Halliwell

John Braye, 2nd Baron Braye (sometimes spelled Bray; d. 19 November 1557) was an English nobleman, courtier, and soldier of the Tudor period.

== Family ==
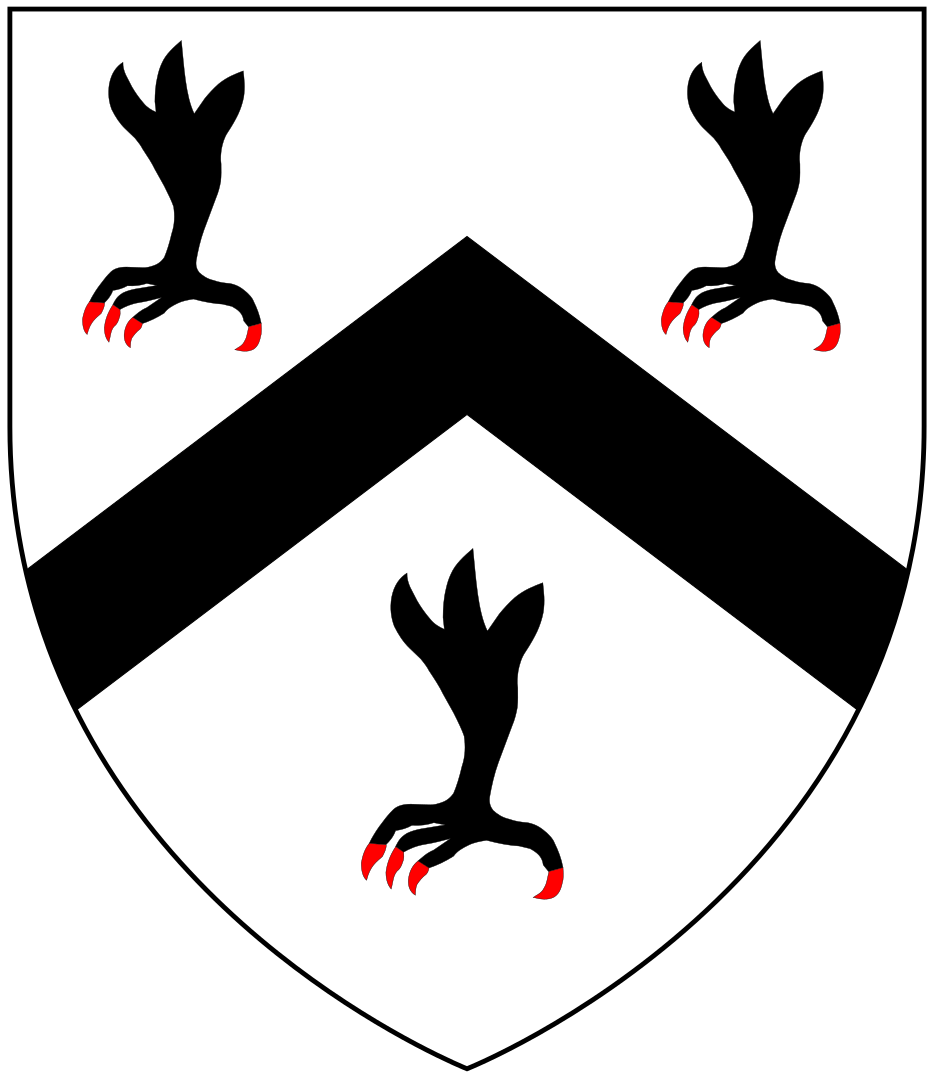
Arms of Braye

Braye was the son of Edmund Braye, who was elevated to the peerage as the first Baron Braye in 1529, by his wife Jane Halliwell. He was the family's only son, but he had six sisters: Anne, who married George Brooke, 9th Baron Cobham; Elizabeth, who married Sir Ralph Verney, of Pendley and Middle Claydon; Frideswide, who married Sir Percival Hart; Mary, who married Sir Robert Peckham; Dorothy, who married Edmund Brydges, 2nd Baron Chandos; and Frances, who married Thomas Lilfield.

When his father died in 1539, Braye succeeded him as the second Baron Braye. Still a minor, he was placed under the wardship of Francis Talbot, 5th Earl of Shrewsbury. Braye would later marry Talbot's daughter, Anne, but they had no children.

== Career ==
Braye was summoned to Parliament from 3 November 1545 until 21 October 1555, and was a significant military figure of the Tudor period. He was one of the commanding officers in the Earl of Hertford's expedition into France near the end of the reign of Henry VIII. During the rebellions in the second year of Edward VI's reign, he was sent with William Parr, 1st Marquess of Northampton to suppress insurrection in Norfolk.

Braye earned the distrust of Queen Mary, after being heard stating a preference for her sister to be on the throne. He was arrested in May 1556 on suspicion of participating in the Dudley conspiracy. While his wife's attempts to secure his release were fruitless, he was eventually pardoned and released in May 1557. Shortly after his pardon, he left for Europe, where he was part of the joint Spanish and English forces at the Battle of St. Quentin. His pardon may have been a result of the influence of Mary's husband, Philip II of Spain, who was noted for his habit of securing "the pardon and release of political prisoners who were also 'serviceable' men of war."

== Death and succession ==
Braye returned to England after the Battle of St. Quentin, but died of his wounds later that year on 19 November 1557. His widow would later remarry to Thomas Wharton, 1st Baron Wharton. He was buried at Chelsea Old Church.

As he had no children and no brothers, his title fell into abeyance upon his death. The abeyance would be terminated nearly three centuries later, in 1839, in favor of Sarah Otway-Cave, a descendant of his sister Elizabeth.

Honorary titles
Preceded by Sir Anthony Browne	Captain of the Gentlemen Pensioners; 1549–1550	Succeeded by The Marquess of Northampton
Peerage of England
Preceded by Edmund Braye	Baron Braye; 1539–1557	Abeyant; Abeyance terminated 1839 in favor of Sarah Otway-Cave
