= Michael Livock =

English cricketer

Personal information
- Full name: Michael Denzil Livock
- Born: 26 July 1936; Surbiton, Surrey, England
- Died: 1999 (aged 62/63); France
- Batting: Right-handed
- Bowling: Right-arm fast
- Relatives: Gerald Livock (uncle)

Career statistics
Competition	First-class
Matches	2
Runs scored	21
Batting average	10.50
100s/50s	–/–
Top score	12
Balls bowled	378
Wickets	8
Bowling average	29.37
5 wickets in innings	–
10 wickets in match	–
Best bowling	4/71
Catches/stumpings	1/–
- Source: Cricinfo, 18 February 2019

Michael Denzil Livock (26 July 1936 – 1999) was an English first-class cricketer.

The son of the Cambridgeshire minor counties cricketer Denzil Livock, he was born at Surbiton. He was later educated at Charterhouse School. Livock made two appearances in first-class cricket for the Free Foresters in 1960, playing against Oxford University and Cambridge University. He scored a total of 12 runs while batting, while his right-arm fast bowling he took 8 wickets at an average of 29.37, with best figures of 4 for 71.

He died in France in 1999. His uncle was the noted first-class cricketer, pilot and archaeologist Gerald Livock.
