= Valentine Maher =

Irish Whig politician, died 1843

Member of Parliament for County Tipperary
- In office 14 July 1841 – December 1843 Serving with Robert Otway-Cave
- Preceded by: Robert Otway-Cave; Richard Lalor Sheil
- Succeeded by: Robert Otway-Cave; Nicholas Maher

Personal details
- Born: 17 May 1780
- Died: 25 December 1843 (aged 63)
- Party: Whig

Valentine Maher (17 May 1780 – 25 December 1843) was an Irish Whig politician.

Maher was first elected Whig MP for County Tipperary at the 1841 general election and held the seat until his death in December 1843. His cousin Nicholas Maher took over the seat in February 1844.

He was a member of Arthur's and a magistrate for County Tipperary.

Parliament of the United Kingdom
Preceded by Robert Otway-Cave; Richard Lalor Sheil	Member of Parliament for County Tipperary; 1841–1844; With: Robert Otway-Cave	Succeeded by Robert Otway-Cave; Nicholas Maher
