= Robert Otway-Cave =

Irish aristocrat and British politician

Robert Otway-Cave (1796 – 29 November 1844), styled The Honourable from 1839, was an Irish aristocrat and British politician.

== Life ==
=== Early life and succession ===
Born Robert Otway, he was the only surviving son of Henry Otway and his wife, the 3rd Baroness Braye, of Castle Otway, County Tipperary in Ireland. His uncle was Sir Robert Otway, 1st Baronet, an admiral in the Royal Navy. He was educated at Eton College and Christ Church, Oxford, matriculating in 1815.

Otway succeeded his father in 1815, inheriting the family seat at Castle Otway. In 1818, he took by royal sign manual the additional surname of Cave, the maiden name of his mother, to whose title he was heir apparent.

=== Political career ===
Otway-Cave entered the British House of Commons in 1826, sitting for Leicester the next four years. In August 1832, he was elected for County Tipperary, which he represented until December. He was again returned for the constituency in 1835, a seat he held until his death in 1844.

=== Personal life ===
On 23 October 1833, he married Sophia Burdett, the eldest daughter of Sir Francis Burdett, 5th Baronet. Otway-Cave died aged 48, after a short illness, at Bath, Somerset. He had no issue; he was laid to rest in a family tomb in St Nicholas Church, Stanford-on-Avon, Northamptonshire. Castle Otway passed, on his wife's death in 1849, to his cousin, Vice-Admiral Robert Jocelyn Otway. The barony passed into abeyance in 1862 on the death of his mother.

Parliament of the United Kingdom
Preceded by John Mansfield; Thomas Pares	Member of Parliament for Leicester; 1826 – 1830; With: Sir Charles Abney-Hastings	Succeeded by Sir Charles Abney-Hastings; William Evans
Preceded by Thomas Wyse; John Hely Hutchinson	Member of Parliament for County Tipperary; August 1832 – December 1832; With: John Hely Hutchinson	Succeeded by Cornelius O'Callaghan; Richard Lalor Sheil
Preceded by Cornelius O'Callaghan; Richard Lalor Sheil	Member of Parliament for County Tipperary; 1835 – 1844; With: Richard Lalor Sheil 1835–1841; Valentine Maher 1841–1844; Nicholas Maher 1844	Succeeded by Nicholas Maher; Richard Albert Fitzgerald
