= James Sadleir =

British politician

James Sadleir (c. 1815 – 4 June 1881) was a member (MP) of the British House of Commons, chiefly notable for being one of the few members expelled by that body. Sadleir was the son of Clement William Sadleir, a farmer, of Shrone Hill, County Tipperary. His mother was the daughter of James Scully, a local banker. His brother John, with whom he was involved in the Tipperary Joint Stock Bank, was MP for Carlow from 1847.

== Entry to politics ==
James Sadleir was approached to stand as a Whig candidate for the County Tipperary constituency in the 1852 election and initially refused, but was eventually induced to accept; he was formally nominated by the incumbent, Nicholas Maher, and was elected easily.

He supported the idea of religious equality in Ireland, although without much enthusiasm for the Roman Catholic priests in his county who passed a vote of censure in April 1853. His brother served in Lord Aberdeen's government as a Junior Lord of the Treasury from December 1852 to January 1854 when he resigned, having been implicated in an attempt to imprison a depositor of the Tipperary Joint Stock Bank who had refused to vote for him.

== Banking scandal ==
The scandal that led to both of their downfalls arose through the crash of the Tipperary Bank in February 1856. The Bank's London agents, Glyn and Co., refused to pay on drafts of the bank, returning them with the words "not provided for". The Bank of Ireland continued to pay as usual for a week more, resulting in a rush of investors withdrawing their money there. Then, on 17 February, John Sadleir, who had been the principal creditor of the bank, poisoned himself on Hampstead Heath. He sent a suicide note to James' wife Emma which read

James is not to blame–I alone have caused all this dreadful ruin. James was to me too fond a brother but he is not to blame for being deceived and led astray by my diabolical acts. Be to him at this moment all the support you can. Oh what I would not suffer with gladness to save those whom I have ruined. My end will prove at least that I was not callous to their agony.

It was found by the Irish courts that John Sadleir had begun to abstract money from the bank from about the end of 1854, and took a total of £288,000 (equivalent to $27,000,000 in 2025).

== Investigations ==
James Sadleir was chairman, managing director and a public agent of the bank, and on 29 February the first creditor sued him to recover £2,827 15s. 4d. It was recognised that he would inevitably bear the brunt of the failure, and The Times reported that there was "a wide-spread feeling of pity" for him as he was already a ruined man. Other creditors of the bank rushed to try to recover their money from him. An early judgment absolved the managers of the bank of responsibility but was soon reversed. The court enquiries disclosed letters written from John to James which implicated him in organising the frauds. However, Sadleir absconded on 17 June. Questions were asked why no criminal charges had been brought against him by this stage, any previous sympathy for his position having disappeared. Charges were brought on 18 July.

== Expelled from the House ==
No-one was entirely sure where Sadleir was. In September, a Carlow newspaper reported that the police were on the wrong scent in looking in New Orleans, as he had made his way to South America. By February 1857, all patience was at an end, and the Attorney-General for Ireland successfully moved for Sadleir's expulsion for failing to surrender to the warrants for his arrest. A letter was read in the debate which placed Sadleir in Paris where he dined every day at the Palais Royal. He was expelled by the House on 16 February. His estates and those of his wife were seized by creditors and sold.

== Fate ==
On 13 May, a letter from Sadleir, posted in Paris, was published in the Dublin Evening Post. He denied involvement in the frauds, and stated that he had denounced his brother when he learnt what he had been doing. This apologia was swiftly countered by James Scully, his cousin who was also implicated in the scandal, who described James as a "notorious culprit". Sadleir was maintained by an annuity paid by his wife's family, the Wheatleys. He never returned to face justice, and moved to Switzerland in 1861, living in Geneva and then Zürich.

Twenty years later, while taking his regular walk up the Zürichberg, Sadleir came upon a thief intent on robbing him of his gold watch. He resisted and was shot dead, his body being concealed in the thicket by the side of the path where it was discovered a week later. His funeral was well-attended. His will was dated 23 May 1856, although the executors suspected that he may have made a later will which they were unable to find.

Parliament of the United Kingdom
Preceded by Nicholas Maher; Francis Scully	Member of Parliament for County Tipperary; 1852 – 1857; With: Francis Scully	Succeeded by Daniel O'Donoghue; Francis Scully
