= Francis Scully (politician) =

Francis Scully (1820 – 18 August 1864), was an Irish politician in the United Kingdom House of Commons.

Scully was elected to the United Kingdom House of Commons as Member of Parliament for County Tipperary in 1847, and held the seat until 1857.

Parliament of the United Kingdom
Preceded by Nicholas Maher; Richard Albert Fitzgerald	Member of Parliament for County Tipperary; 1847 – 1857; With: Nicholas Maher 1847–1852; James Sadleir 1852–1857; Daniel O'Donoghue 1857	Succeeded by Daniel O'Donoghue; Laurence Waldron
