= St Michael's Church, Stretton en le Field =

Coordinates: 52.7041°N 1.5516°W

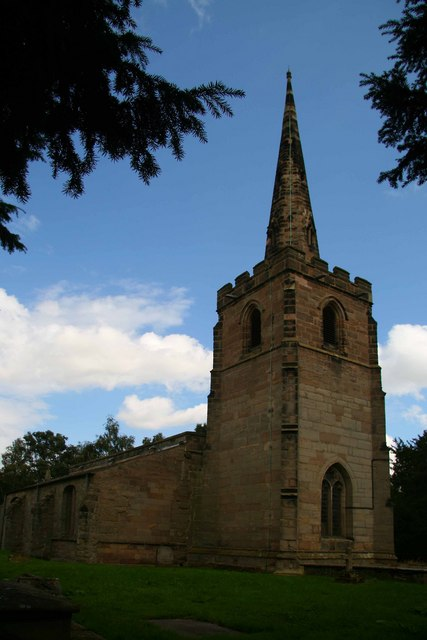
- St Michael's Church, Stretton en le Field, from the northwest

- Location in Leicestershire
- Location: Stretton en le Field, Leicestershire
- Country: England
- Denomination: Anglican
- Website: Churches Conservation Trust

History
- Dedication: Saint Michael

Architecture
- Functional status: Redundant
- Heritage designation: Grade II*
- Designated: 24 November 1965
- Architect: Christopher Spalding (restoration)
- Architectural type: Church
- Style: Gothic
- Groundbreaking: 14th century
- Completed: 1889

Specifications
- Materials: Sandstone

St Michael's Church is a redundant Anglican church in the village of Stretton en le Field, Leicestershire, England (grid reference SK303119). It is recorded in the National Heritage List for England as a designated Grade II* listed building, and is under the care of the Churches Conservation Trust.

== History ==
Most of the fabric in the church dates from the 14th century. The tower was added in the 15th century, and the clerestory in the following century. More alterations were made in the following three centuries. The spire was rebuilt in 1889, and in 1911 a restoration was carried out by Christopher Spalding. After it was declared redundant, the church was vested in the Churches Conservation Trust.

== Architecture ==
=== Exterior ===
The church is constructed in local sandstone. Its plan consists of a nave with a north aisle and a south porch, a chancel, and a west tower. The tower is in two stages. In the lower stage is a west Perpendicular window, and the upper stage contains a single-light bell opening on each side. The parapet is battlemented, and on top of the tower is a recessed spire. The nave has a plain parapet and its arched windows have been divided by central mullions. The five windows in the clerestory are square-headed, and are also divided into two lights by mullions. The north aisle has windows, some of which are blocked, and a doorway, also blocked, under a Tudor arch. The chancel has a battlemented parapet with pinnacles, and a Perpendicular five-light east window.

=== Interior ===
Between the nave and the north aisle is a three-bay arcade. In the wall of the aisle are the remnants of a tomb recess with pinnacles. The church is floored with square brick tiles. All the windows contain leaded lights. The timber roof has bosses and carved grotesque figures. The chancel arch appears to be made of stone, but it is in fact wooden and covered with stucco, giving it the appearance of stone. The church contains a full set of 18th-century box pews, and a chancel rail with turned balusters from the same period. The font dates from about 1662. The memorials include a carved alabaster grave slab to Richard Savage who died in 1489, and his wife, Agnes. There is a brass tablet giving thanks for the fact that eleven men from the Parish went to the Great War of 1914 to 1918 and all eleven returned making Stretton en le Field one of the Thankful Villages.

== See also ==
- List of churches preserved by the Churches Conservation Trust in the English Midlands
