= Richard Albert Fitzgerald =

Irish politician, died in 1847

Member of Parliament for County Tipperary
- In office 21 February 1845 – June 1847 Serving with Nicholas Maher
- Preceded by: Robert Otway-Cave; Nicholas Maher
- Succeeded by: Francis Scully; Nicholas Maher

Personal details
- Born: Richard Albert FitzGerald; 1806 Clonmel, County Tipperary
- Died: circa June 1847 Youghal, County Cork
- Cause of death: Typhus fever contracted while helping with the poor during the famine of 1847
- Resting place: Youghal Cemetery family vault
- Party: Repeal Association
- Spouse(s): Amelia/Emilia Frizoni di Celerina of Lisbon 1807–1895 the daughter of Daniel Frizoni 1765–1854 and Anna Isabella Lecussan Verdier 1788–1821
- Children: 1. Annie Catherine 1837–1919 married Andrew Thunder 1824–1902, 2. Richard Edwin 1838–1916 married Lucie Martin du Boistaillé 1840–1882, 3. Marie Geraldine 1840–1917, 4. Catherine Hélène Elizabeth Mary FitzGerald 1842–1916 married Alfred Taupinart de Tilière, comté 1843–1916, 5. Ada Cecily Charlotte FitzGerald 1844– married Humbert Beausire de Seyssel, comté died 1918, 6. Christina Frances FitzGerald 1845–1934 married Victor Laurent Valentin Sommyèvre, vicomte de Chateau Courchevelles Burgundy 1828–1909, 7 Maria FitzGerald 1847–1916 married her third cousin Auguste Anthony Morlet de Museau ca 1839–1916
- Parent(s): Richard FitzGerald and Catherine 'Kate' Nagle
- Education: Clongowes and then studied Law at TCD but never practiced

Richard Albert Fitzgerald (1806 – c. June 1847) was an Irish Repeal Association politician.

He was educated at Clongowes Wood College and St. Patrick's, Carlow College, and also spent some time being taught in Paris.

Fitzgerald was first elected Repeal Association MP for County Tipperary at a by-election in 1845—caused by the death of Robert Otway-Cave—and held the seat until 1847, when he did not seek re-election.

Parliament of the United Kingdom
Preceded by Robert Otway-Cave; Nicholas Maher	Member of Parliament for County Tipperary; 1845–1847; With: Nicholas Maher	Succeeded by Francis Scully; Nicholas Maher
