= Stanford Park =

Protected area in Leicestershire, England

Coordinates: 52.406°N 1.14°W

- Site of Special Scientific Interest
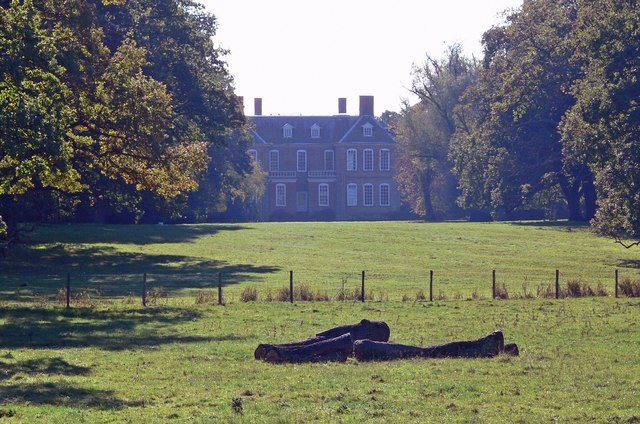
- Location of Stanford Park.
- Area of search: Leicestershire
- Grid reference: SP 586 792
- Interest: Biological
- Area: 20.4 hectares (50 acres)
- Notification date: 1983
- Location map: Magic Map

Stanford Park is a 20.4 hectares (50 acres) biological Site of Special Scientific Interest east of Swinford in Leicestershire.

The park has avenues of oak trees, together with other large trees in an area of pasture. It has the most diverse lichens in the county on the bark of mature trees and on old stonework, including fifteen species not recorded elsewhere in Leicestershire.

The park is the grounds of Stanford Hall, a stately home which is open to the public.
