= Annette Jocelyn Otway-Ruthven =

Irish historian

Annette Jocelyn Otway-Ruthven (7 November 1909 – 18 March 1989) was an Irish historian specialising in medieval Irish history, and was among the earliest female academics appointed in Trinity College Dublin.

== Family and early life ==
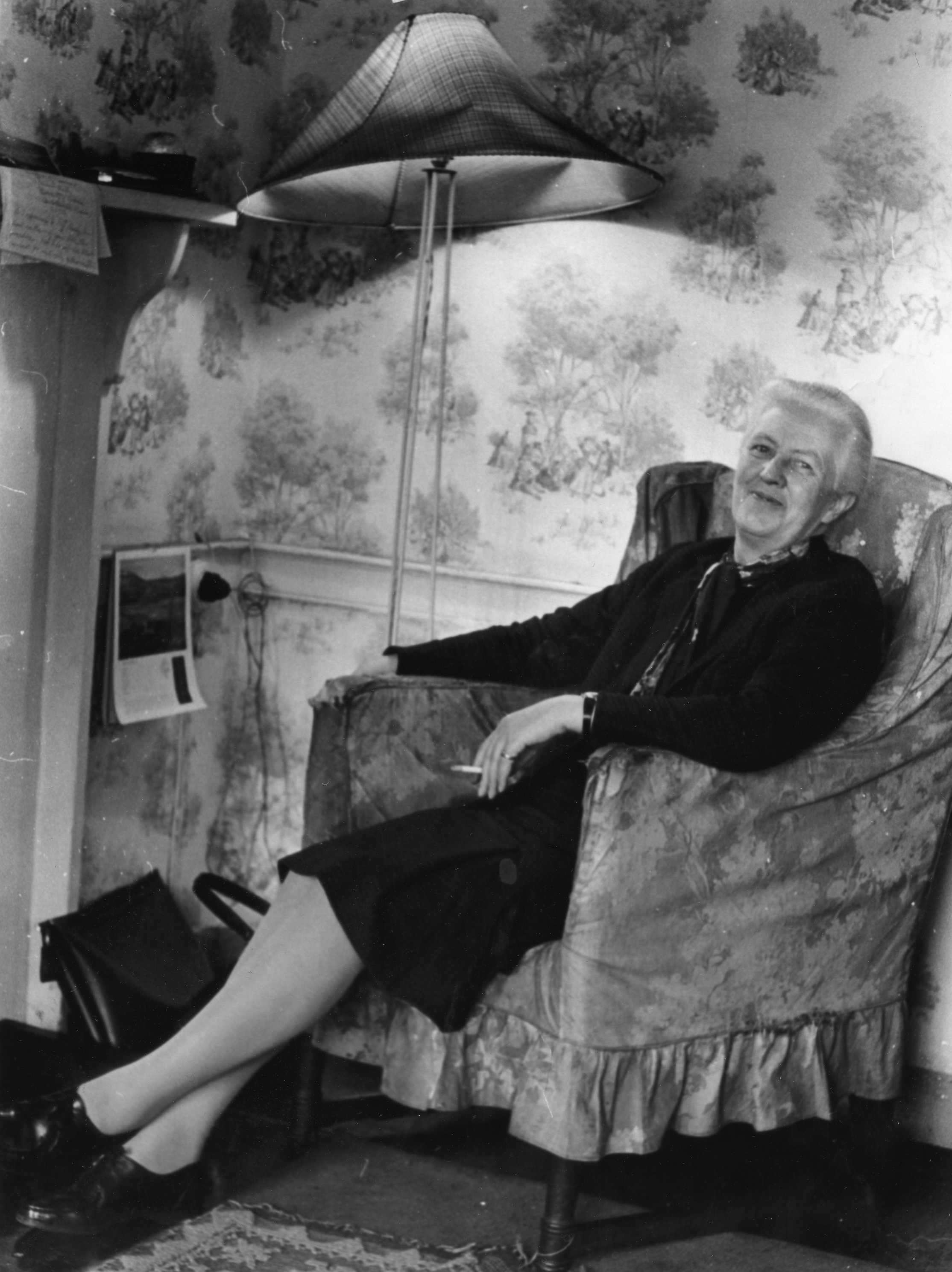
A. J. Otway-Ruthven (1909-1989) was appointed Lecky Professor of History in Trinity College Dublin in 1951 and was one of the first female Fellows.

Otway-Ruthven was the daughter of Captain Robert Mervyn Bermingham Otway-Ruthven (1867–1919), Royal Artillery, of Castle Otway, County Tipperary, and Margaret Casement (d. 1953), of Cronroe, County Wicklow. She had three sisters and a brother; two of her sisters died young. Through her mother Otway-Ruthven was related to Roger Casement. She went to the Hall School in Belgrave Square, Monkstown.

== Academic career ==
Otway-Ruthven studied history in Trinity College Dublin, was elected a Scholar of the college in 1928, and graduated BA in 1931. She continued her studies at Girton College, University of Cambridge, writing The King's Secretary and the Signet Office in the XV Century for which she was awarded a PhD.

She returned to Trinity College in 1938 as lecturer in medieval and modern history and in economic history; she succeeded Constantia Maxwell as Lecky professor in 1951. From 1965 she headed a new department of medieval history which, under her direction, became one of the finest departments in the college. In 1968 TCD made her one of its first female Fellows. The position of female academics in Trinity College when Otway-Ruthven was appointed in 1938, had barely improved since the first appointment of a woman, Constantia Maxwell, in 1909. Otway-Ruthven resented this discrimination: "We were paid less than men doing the equivalent work, and I have been told that this was right since … we were less useful to the College."

A former student, James Lydon (1928–2013), who later became a colleague of Otway-Ruthven at Trinity, claimed of her that 'her contribution to Irish history ... will never be surpassed'. Lydon also noted her kindness to students who were in difficulties. One of her most distinguished students was F. S. L. Lyons, who later became Provost of Trinity College Dublin.

== Select publications ==
Otway-Ruthven's area of particular interest was Ireland in the twelfth century and the impact on the country of the arrival of the Anglo-Normans. She published extensively and her monograph A History of Medieval Ireland (1968; second edition 1980), was a landmark in Irish historiography. She translated the Cambridgeshire Domesday Book in 1941 and the Liber Primus Kilkenniensis., she published Dowdall deeds with Charles McNeill in 1960 and brought a calendar of the Talbot de Malahide papers close to completion.

Otway-Ruthven also engaged in a project to reconstruct, from transcripts in London, Irish chancery rolls which had been lost in the destruction of the Public Record Office of Ireland in the Irish War of Independence in 1922. Her work in this regard was acknowledged when the project was brought to completion in the 21st century.

She was appointed to the Irish Manuscripts Commission in 1943 and was elected FRHS in 1941 and MRIA in 1951. She was a member of the International Commission for the History of Representative and Parliamentary Institutions.

== Personal and later life ==
Otway-Ruthven was an amateur botanist, raising rare plants in her garden at Rathgar, and was also proficient in needlework.

Shortly after her retirement in 1980 she was incapacitated by a severe stroke which left her paralysed and near-speechless. The rest of her life was spent in a nursing home, where she died on 18 March 1989. Her papers are deposited in Trinity College, and the college has a portrait of her by the artist Derek Hill. The college is also home to the Castle-Otway Harp, an eighteenth-century Irish musical instrument which, although it has no known association with the family, was in Castle Otway from the mid nineteenth century.
