= Baron Braye =

Title in the Peerage of England

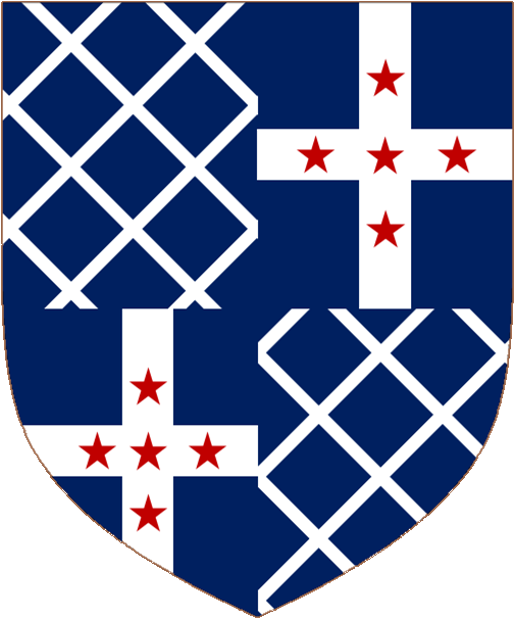
The arms of Lord Braye

Baron Braye, of Eaton Bray in the County of Bedford, is a title in the Peerage of England. It was created in 1529 for Edmund Braye, 1st Baron Braye. However, the family originally originate from Normandy, they are direct descendants of Chevalier Baudry de Bray who came over to England in the Battle of Hastings of 1066. The family's local area in Leicestershire played host to two battles in England of note, the Battle of Bosworth Field where the current family's ancestor's were on opposing sides, and also Battle of Naseby during the First English Civil War, where the old manor house hosted King Charles I. The barony was created by writ, which means that it can descend through both male and female lines. He was succeeded by his son, the second Baron. He died from wounds received at the Battle of St Quentin in 1557. Lord Braye was childless and on his death the title fell into abeyance between his sisters.

It remained in abeyance for 282 years until the abeyance was terminated in 1839 in favour of Sarah Otway-Cave, who became the third Baroness Braye, which was granted by Queen Victoria. She was the wife of Henry Otway and only daughter of Sir Thomas Cave, 6th Baronet, of Stanford, grandson of Sir Thomas Cave, 3rd Baronet, of Stanford, and his wife Margaret Verney, daughter of John Verney, 1st Viscount Fermanagh, great-great-grandson of Elizabeth Verney, second daughter of the first Baron Braye, and her husband Sir Ralph Verney. In 1819 she assumed by Royal licence the additional surname of Cave. And also she inherited Stanford hall in Leicestershire which is a family home but also open to the public for private, weddings and corporate events for a short stay.

When she died in 1862 the barony fell into abeyance between her four daughters. In 1879 the abeyance was terminated in favour of the last surviving daughter, Henrietta, the fourth Baroness. She was the wife of Reverend Edgell Wyatt-Edgell. She was succeeded by her fourth but eldest surviving son, the fifth Baron. In 1880 he assumed by Royal licence the surname of Verney-Cave in lieu of Wyatt-Edgell. As of 2010 the title is held by his great-granddaughter, the eighth Baroness, who succeeded her father in 1985. She is the wife of Edward Henry Lancelot Aubrey-Fletcher, fourth son of Sir Henry Aubrey-Fletcher, 6th Baronet. They have no children. Lady Braye is heir-general of the Verney family (see the Earl Verney).

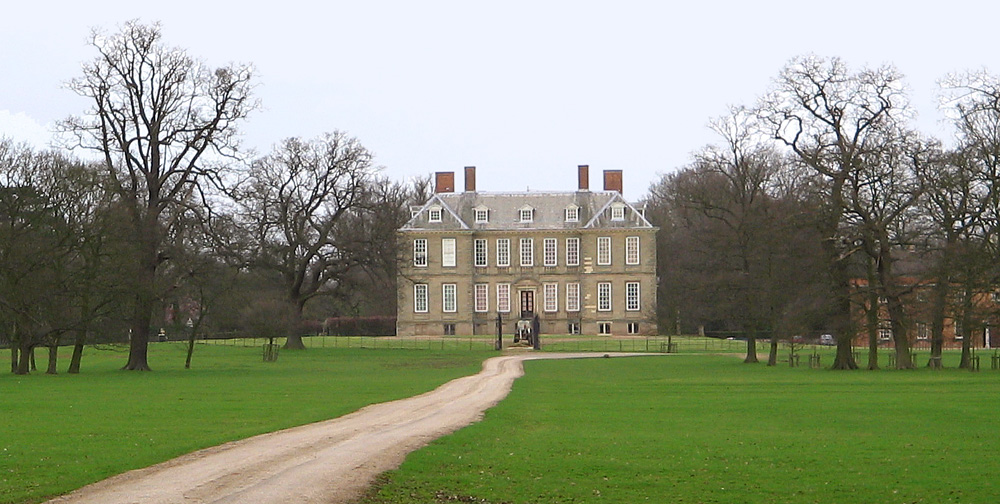
Stanford Hall

The family seat is Stanford Hall near Lutterworth, Leicestershire.

== Barons Braye (1529) ==
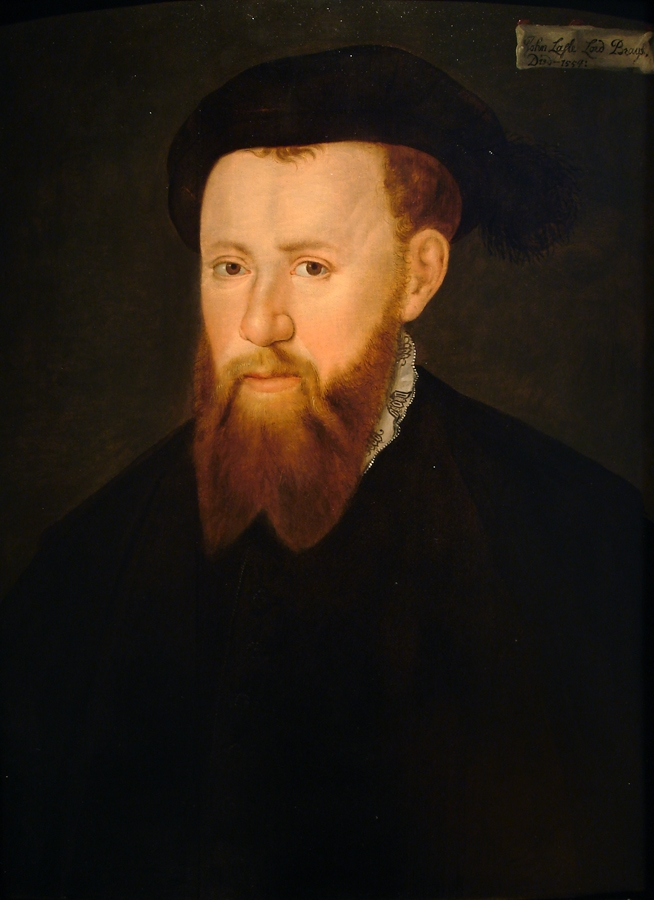
John Braye, 2nd Baron Braye

- Edmund Braye, 1st Baron Braye (d. 1539)
- John Braye, 2nd Baron Braye (d. 1557) (abeyant 1557)
- Sarah Otway-Cave, 3rd Baroness Braye (2 July 1768 – 21 February 1862) (abeyance terminated 1839; abeyant 1862)
  - Robert Otway-Cave (1796–1844)
- Henrietta Wyatt-Edgell, 4th Baroness Braye (1809–1879) (abeyance terminated 1879)
- Alfred Verney-Cave, 5th Baron Braye (1849–1928)
- Adrian Verney-Cave, 6th Baron Braye (1874–1952)
- Thomas Adrian Verney-Cave, 7th Baron Braye (1902–1985)
- Mary Penelope Aubrey-Fletcher, 8th Baroness Braye (b. 1941). Baroness Braye was admitted to the House of Lords on 19 December 1985. She took the Conservative whip on 9 April the following year. She gave one speech in the House of Lords on 28 January 1987, in support of the Infant Life (Preservation) Bill at the second reading. She was excluded from the House of Lords, along with the majority of hereditary peers, on 11 November 1999, as a result of the House of Lords Act 1999.

== See also ==
- Earl Verney
- Cave-Browne-Cave baronets, of Stanford
- Stanford Hall, Leicestershire

== External notes ==
- Hesilrige, Arthur G. M. (1921). Debrett's Peerage and Titles of courtesy. London: London: Dean & son, limited. p. 137.
- Kidd, Charles, Williamson, David (editors). Debrett's Peerage and Baronetage (1990 edition). New York: St Martin's Press, 1990,
- Leigh Rayment's Peerage Pages
