= Stanford Hall, Leicestershire =

Historic house museum in Leicestershire, England

Coordinates: 52°24′31″N 1°08′19″W

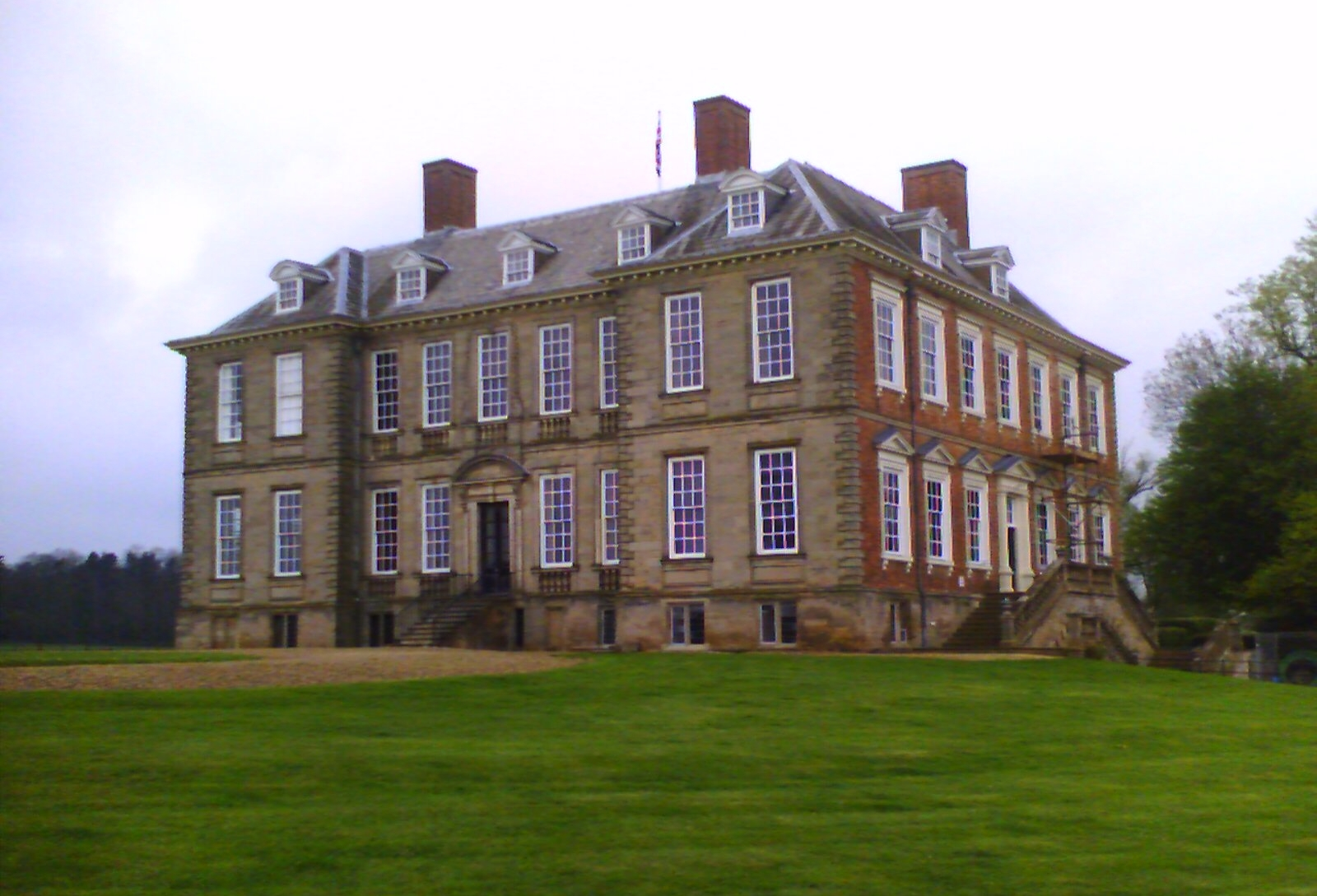
Stanford Hall

Stanford Hall is a stately home in Leicestershire, England, near the village of Stanford on Avon (which is in Northamptonshire) and the town of Lutterworth, Leicestershire. The population of any residents in the area is included in the civil parish of Misterton with Walcote.

== History ==
Ancestral home of the Cave family from c. 1430, the hall was built in the 1690s for Sir Roger Cave, 2nd Baronet. Described by Simon Jenkins as the "perfect William and Mary house", the architect was William Smith of Warwick.

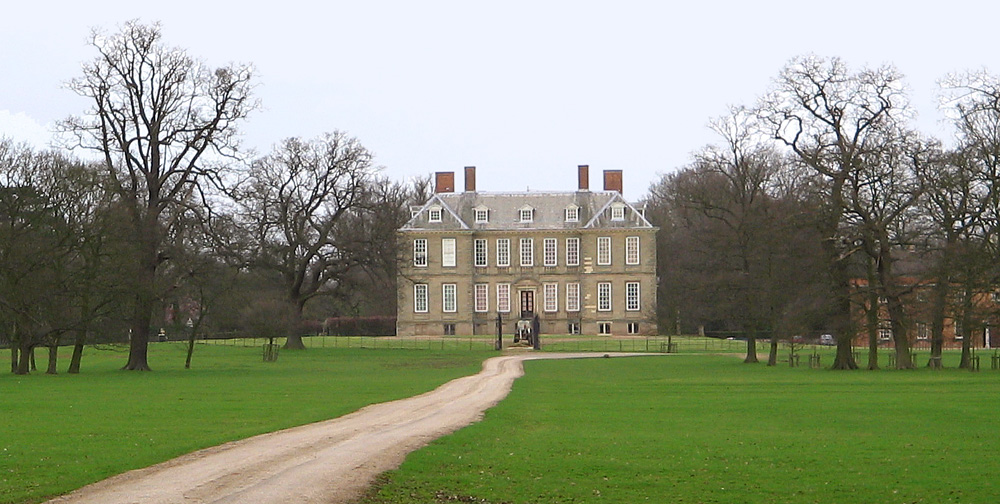
The Hall, west side

In 1792 Sarah, daughter of Sir Thomas Cave Bt, inherited the Cave estate on the death of her nephew Sir Thomas Cave, 7th Baronet. She had married Henry Otway in 1790 and was created Baroness Braye in 1839. Her descendants remain in residence. (Henry Otway was High Sheriff of Leicestershire in 1804).

The River Avon flows through the grounds, with a weir downstream, so a small lake is formed.

The aviation pioneer Percy Pilcher built some of his early gliders here in the 1890s; he also built a powered flying machine here that many historians believe was capable of flight, but he was killed nearby in an accident in 1899 before he could try it. An exact replica of Pilcher's "The Hawk" glider is exhibited at the hall.

During World War II the nuns and pupils from the Sacred Heart Convent and School in Roehampton, London, were evacuated to the Hall. Their premises were so badly damaged that when war ended they had to relocate to Woldingham School near London. From 1947 until 1949 it was the country branch of St. Mary's Town and Country School. By that time the roof was uncared for and in serious need of repair, but the Historic Buildings Council recommended a large grant for restoration and the hall was opened to the public in 1958.

== Attractions ==
Today the hall is a tourist attraction open to the public on limited days in the year. Among the attractions are guided tours of the hall and its grounds, a forge, a beautiful rose garden, a shop and tea rooms. The house has a significant collection of antique furnishings; for example, the hall has one room with original 17th-century furnishings including a refectory table and set of Charles II chairs.

The grounds of the hall are used for concerts and classic car shows, including the Wartburg/Trabant/IFA Club Rally and since 1983 has hosted the annual National Mini Day for owners of Mini cars. The grounds hosted the first Stanford Hall Half Marathon and 10k running race in March 2014. Since 2003 Stanford Hall has been host to Firework Champions – the UK's leading firework competition.

Some of the parkland is designated a Site of Special Scientific Interest called Stanford Park due to the diversity of lichen species on the trees.
