= Beatrice Mabel Cave-Browne-Cave =

Mathematician, engineer

Beatrice Cave-Browne-Cave MBE
- Born: May 30, 1874
- Died: July 9, 1947 (aged 73)
- Education: Girton College, Cambridge
- Occupation: Mathematician
- Employer: University College London
- Family: Frances Cave-Browne-Cave, Henry Cave-Browne-Cave and the Cave-Browne-Cave baronets
- Awards: MBE (1920)

Beatrice Mabel Cave-Browne-Cave, MBE AFRAeS (30 May 1874 – 9 July 1947) was an English mathematician who undertook pioneering work in the mathematics of aeronautics.

== Birth and education ==
Beatrice Cave-Browne-Cave was the daughter of Sir Thomas Cave-Browne-Cave and Blanche Matilda Mary Ann (née Milton). She was one of six siblings. The family surname (Cave-Browne-Cave) came from a variety of historical circumstances but she and her younger sister Frances tended to use the single surname Cave professionally. Cave was educated at home in Streatham and entered Girton College, Cambridge with Frances in 1895. In 1898, she completed a degree in the mathematical tripos, earning second-class honors. The following year, Cave passed part II of the mathematical tripos with third-class honors.

== Career ==
Cave spent eleven years teaching mathematics to girls at a high school in Clapham in south-west London and doing computing work at home.

In the years just before the First World War, Cave worked under Professor Karl Pearson in the Galton Laboratory at University College, London. In 1903, she was among six researchers, including her sister Frances, that collaborated on a large child development study led by Pearson. They worked unpaid until the Worshipful Company of Drapers provided a grant that paid them a stipend in 1904. Pearson hoped to establish evidence of the inheritance of attributes by collecting physical and mental data from 4000 children and their parents, which included some of Cave's high school students. She assisted in the collection and processing of data as well as related computations. Cave published in Biometrika and also conducted statistical analyses for the Treasury and Board of Trade. Cave started working full-time as a computer at the Galton Laboratory in 1913, in which time she co-authored two papers published in Biometrika, including Numerical Illustrations of the Variate Difference Method. Cave also created correlation tables in 1917 based on a series of mice breeding experiments by Raphael Weldon, a colleague of Pearson's at University College. Her correlation tables included tables showing amount of pigment, connecting old and new process of determining amount of pigmentation, mother and son pigmentation percentages, grandparents and offspring, and father and son amount of pigment in mice.

In 1916, Cave began working for the government on airplane design. She carried out original research for the government on the mathematics of aeronautics which remained classified under the Official Secrets Act for fifty years. She examined the effects of loads on different areas of planes during flight, and her research helped to improve aircraft stability and propeller efficiency. Some of her works are held in UCL archives which include correspondence from her time at the Galton Laboratory for work on bomb trajectories, terminal velocities, timber tests, and detonators, for the Admiralty Air Department and Ministry of Munitions.

Cave was elected an associate fellow of the Royal Aeronautical Society in 1919 and awarded an MBE in 1920. She later worked as an assistant to Sir Leonard Bairstow, the Zaharoff Professor of Aviation at Imperial College, and she worked on fluid motion. In 1922, Cave's studies on aircraft oscillations were published in an Advisory Committee for Aeronautics technical report. Cave's name was also included alongside Bairstow in his 1922 and 1923 published reports on fluid mechanics.

== Later life and death ==
Cave retired in 1937, continuing to live in Streatham. She died on 9 July 1947 at age 73.
