= Frances Cave-Browne-Cave =

English mathematician (1876–1965)

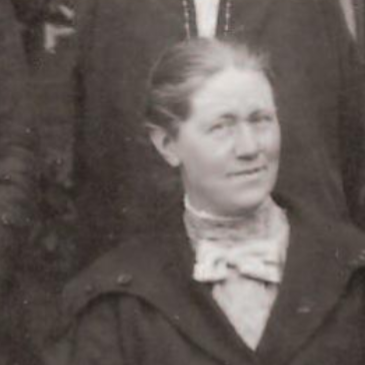
- in 1919 at Girton
- Born: 21 February 1876
- Died: 30 March 1965 (aged 89); Shedfield, Hampshire, England
- Education: Girton College, Cambridge
- Occupation: Mathematician
- Employer: Girton College, Cambridge
- Title: Director of Mathematical Studies
- Family: Beatrice Mabel Cave-Browne-Cave, Henry Cave-Browne-Cave and the Cave-Browne-Cave baronets
- Awards: Life Fellow of Girton College

Frances Evelyn Cave-Browne-Cave FRAS (1876–1965) was an English mathematician and educator.

== Early life ==
Frances Cave-Browne-Cave was the daughter of Sir Thomas Cave-Browne-Cave and Blanche Matilda Mary Ann Milton. She was educated at home in Streatham Common with her sisters and entered Girton College, Cambridge, with her elder sister Beatrice Mabel Cave-Browne-Cave in 1895. She obtained a first-class degree and she would have been Fifth Wrangler in 1898 if she had been a man. She took Part II of the Mathematical Tripos in 1899.

== Career and continued studies ==
Like her sister, she was usually known by the single surname Cave professionally. Along with Beatrice, she worked with Karl Pearson at University College London. Her work was funded by the first research grant offered at Girton: an Old Students' Research Studentship from Girton, provided by Florence Margaret Durham. She also received a stipend as a result of a grant to Pearson's laboratory from the Worshipful Company of Drapers. Her research in the field of meteorology produced two publications in the Proceedings of the Royal Society which discussed barometric measurements, and was read to the British Association at Cambridge in 1904.

In 1903, Cave returned to Girton as a fellow. She prioritised teaching over research, and focused on developing the weakest students because she felt that was where the biggest difference could be made. She became the director of studies in 1918. She was on the executive council of the college and was largely responsible for drafting the charter of incorporation granted in 1924. On the 11 November 1921 she was elected a Fellow of the Royal Astronomical Society. Cave was made honorary fellow of Girton in 1942.

Cave received an MA from Trinity College, Dublin in 1907 as a steamboat lady since the rules of Cambridge University did not then permit women to take degrees, and from Cambridge in 1926.

== Later life and death ==
Cave retired to Southampton in 1936. She died in Shedfield in a nursing home on 30 March 1965.
