= Loftus Otway =

General Sir Loftus Otway CB
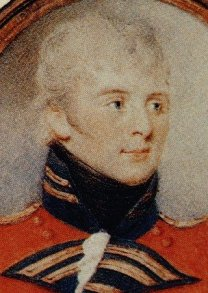
- Born: 28 April 1775; Castle Otway, County Tipperary
- Died: 7 June 1854 (aged 79); Grosvenor Square, London
- Military career
- Allegiance: United Kingdom
- Branch: (United Kingdom) British Army
- Service years: 1796 to 1819
- Rank: General
- Conflicts: French Revolutionary Wars; Irish Rebellion of 1798; Battle of Vinegar Hill; Napoleonic Wars; Battle of Sahagún; Battle of Benavente; Battle of Busaco; Battle of Albuera
- Awards: Knighthood; Companion of the Bath; Knight of the Order of Charles III

General Sir Loftus William Otway, CB (28 April 1775 – 7 June 1854) was an experienced and professional cavalry commander of British forces during the Peninsula War who saw extensive service under Sir John Moore in the Corunna Campaign and Wellington in the remainder of the campaign. He also worked training Portuguese troops and spent time serving in Ireland during the 1798 rebellion and Canada. Otway retired after the Peninsula War and was honoured several times for his war service by both the British and Spanish royal families.

== Early career ==
Otway was born the fourth of five sons to Cooke and Elizabeth Otway of Castle Otway, near Nenagh in County Tipperary. The family had a strong military tradition, Cooke Otway was an officer in the local militia and Loftus's elder brother Robert Waller Otway later became an admiral and baronet. Otway joined the army aged 21 in 1796 during the French Revolutionary Wars, taking a post in the 5th Dragoon Guards as a cornet. Within months he had purchased advancement to lieutenant and was with the regiment when they were posted to Ireland in October 1796, prior to the outbreak of the 1798 Rebellion. Otway's service in quelling the uprising is not clear, but he was certainly present at the Battle of Vinegar Hill on 21 June 1798, when his unit was employed in riding down the panicking rebels at the collapse of the rebellion.

== Napoleonic Wars ==
Otway continued to use family and financial influence to climb the ranks, becoming a captain in October 1798 and major in 1803 after the outbreak of the Napoleonic Wars. In 1804, Otway transferred to the 8th Dragoons and spent time in Canada in the adjutant-generals office. Returning to Europe in 1807, Otway volunteered for service in Portugal and Spain with the 18th Light Dragoons and was attached to Sir Arthur Wellesley's army, although he did not see any action before the temporary peace treaty. Joining Sir John Moore's forces in Galicia, Otway's regiment was instrumental in covering its retreat to Corunna and was engaged in several cavalry engagements at Rueda, Valladolid, Sahagún and Benavente. In the course of these operations, Otway distinguished himself and captured a large quantity of enemy troops, including a French general.

Evacuated from Corunna on 16 January 1809, Otway's regiment was stationed in England and Otway took leave, returning to Wellesley's army in the Peninsula to command a Portuguese cavalry brigade under William Beresford. With this force, Otway was repeatedly engaged, including service at the Battle of Busaco in 1810 and a victory at Campo Mayor in 1811 which was wasted by the profligacy of his senior officer Robert Ballard Long. However, Long was of the opinion, and was subsequently supported in this by the historian William Napier, that it was Beresford's refusal to release the British brigade of heavy dragoons that led to the escape of the French force.

At the Battle of Albuera which followed the Campo Mayor action, Otway performed capably on the left flank although his forces were not heavily engaged. The same day, Otway was placed on half-pay in reserve by Horse Guards as he was officially detached from his regiment. In 1812, Otway had returned to England but continued service, formulating a plan to raise a cavalry regiment of non-French prisoners of war which was ultimately rejected. Frustrated, Otway returned to Portugal and was employed for the remainder of the Peninsula War training Portuguese and Spanish cavalry regiments. In 1813 he was promoted to full colonel.

== Retirement ==
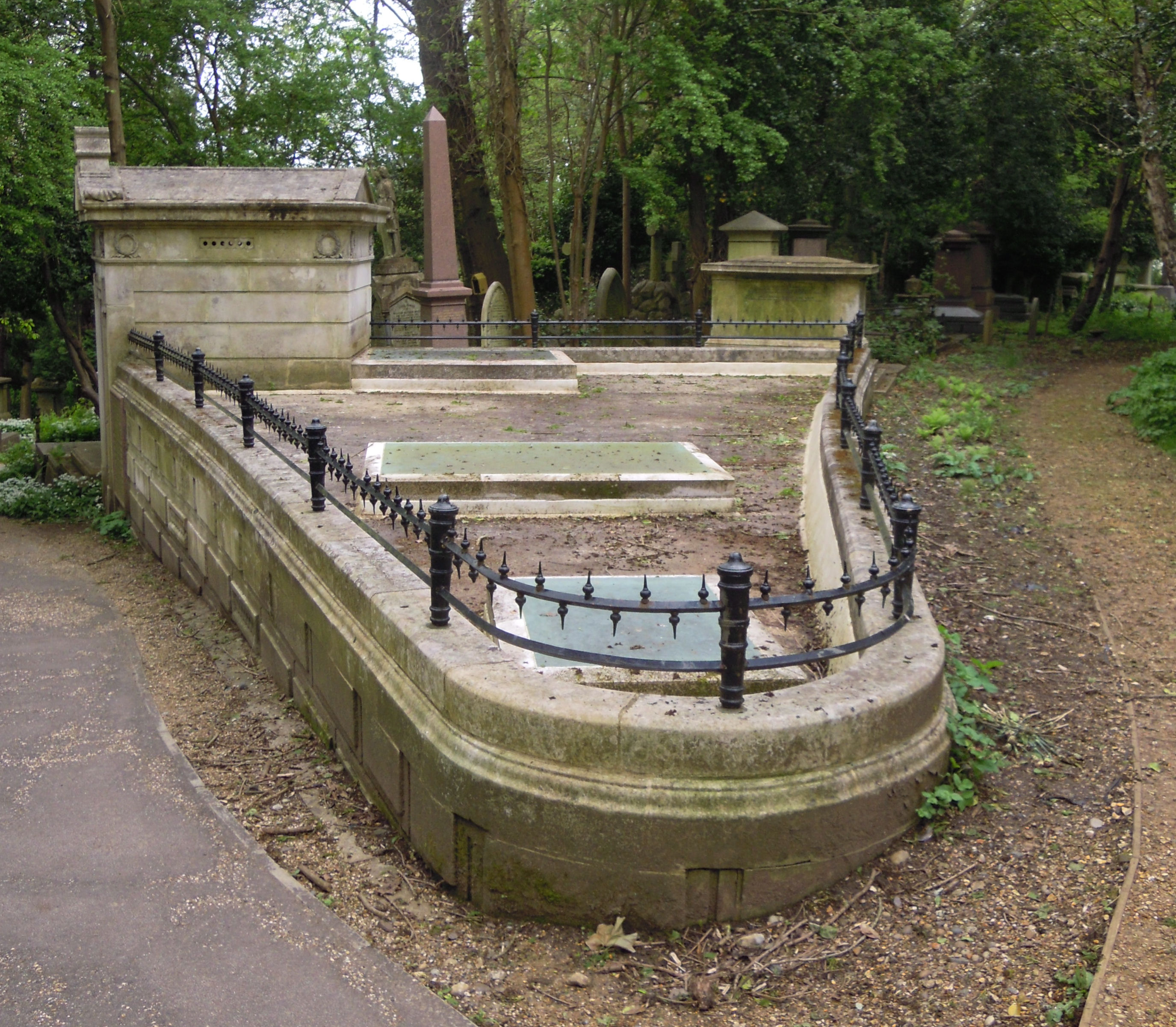
The family tomb of Loftus William Otway

Following the conclusion of the war, Otway retired from active military service although he remained a figure in military planning for the remainder of his life. In 1815 he was knighted by the Prince Regent in London. At the reformation of the Order of the Bath in June of the same year, Otway was made a companion. In 1819 he was promoted to major-general and in 1822 was made a Spanish Knight of the Order of Charles III. During this period he married Frances Blicke and had two children. In 1837 Otway was again promoted, to lieutenant general, and in 1840 became Colonel of the 84th Regiment of Foot. In 1851 he was given a final promotion, to the rank of full general. He died in his home at 17 Grosvenor Square in London in 1854 and was interred at Highgate Cemetery in North London.

== Arms ==
Coat of arms of Sir Loftus Otway
Coronet Si Deus nobiscum quis contra nos (If God be with us, who can be against us?) Crest Out of a ducal coronet Or a cross calvary also Or, between two wings Sable. Escutcheon Argent, a pile Sable, over all a chevron counterchanged, on a chief Azure an anchor erect encircled by a wreath of laurel Or, between, on the dexter, a demi-Neptune Proper, issuant out of a naval crown gold, and on the sinister a mermaid Proper; a martlet for difference.

== Bibliography ==
- "Otway, Loftus William". Oxford Dictionary of National Biography (online ed.). Oxford University Press. doi:10.1093/ref:odnb/60033. (Subscription, Wikipedia Library access or UK public library membership required.)
- "Otway, Loftus William". Otway Family Tree.

Military offices
Preceded by Sir Fitzroy Jeffries Grafton Maclean, Bt	Colonel of the 84th (York and Lancaster) Regiment of Foot; 1840–1854	Succeeded by Sir George Augustus Wetherall
