= Henry Cave-Browne-Cave =

Royal Air Force Air Vice-Marshal (1887–1965)

- Born: Henry Meyrick Cave-Browne-Cave; 1 February 1887; Streatham, Surrey
- Died: 5 August 1965 (aged 78); Southampton, Hampshire
- Military career
- Allegiance: United Kingdom
- Branch: Royal Navy (1903–18); Royal Air Force (1918–40)
- Service years: 1903–1940
- Rank: Air Vice Marshal
- Commands: No. 25 Group (1938–39); No. 16 Group (1937–38); RAF College Cranwell (1934–36); RAF Singapore (1930); No. 205 Squadron (1929–30); Far East Flight (1927–29)
- Conflicts: World War I World War II
- Awards: Companion of the Order of the Bath; Distinguished Service Order; Distinguished Flying Cross

Air Vice Marshal Henry Meyrick Cave-Browne-Cave CB, DSO, DFC (1 February 1887 – 5 August 1965), was an engineering officer in the Royal Naval Air Service during the First World War and senior commander in the Royal Air Force during the 1930s.

He was prominent in the development of seaplanes and, following the armistice, flying boats. In 1927 he led crews in four flying boats, the Far East Flight, from England around Australia and then up to Hong Kong. His career was cut short by a serious flying accident in January 1939 so until 1945 he was appointed Air Liaison Officer to the Regional Commission for Scotland.

== Family ==
Henry Cave-Browne-Cave was the younger son of Thomas (later Sir Thomas) Cave-Browne-Cave CB (1835–1924), Deputy Accountant-General of the War Office, and Blanche Matilda Mary Ann Milton, (Note: and a great-grandson of Sir William Cave-Browne-Cave, 9th baronet.) and much younger brother of the mathematicians Beatrice Mabel Cave-Browne-Cave and Frances Cave-Browne-Cave. The elder brother, Wing Commander Thomas Reginald Cave-Brown-Cave (1885–1964), also served with distinction in the Royal Air Force but initially in airships.

Son of a senior administrative official in the Army, born and raised on the north side of Streatham Common, he was educated at Dulwich College in London, became an engineering student in the Royal Navy in 1903 and was promoted to Engineer sub-lieutenant in 1907.

== First World War ==
During the First World War, Cave-Browne-Cave served in the Royal Naval Air Service, initially as the Engineering Officer at the Grain Island naval air station and later as the second in command of the station. In the summer of 1916, Cave-Browne-Cave was appointed as a squadron commander. He later served as Officer Commanding the Seaplane Station at Dunkirk and then as the Officer Commanding the Seaplane Station at Malta.

By 1918, Cave-Browne-Cave had risen to the rank of wing commander and on 1 April, when the Royal Naval Air Service merged with the Royal Flying Corps to form the Royal Air Force, Cave-Browne-Cave was transferred to the RAF as a lieutenant colonel.

== Inter-war years ==
In 1919 Cave-Browne-Cave was awarded a permanent commission in the RAF and reverted to his previous rank of wing commander. He went on to serve in a senior training appointment at No. 1 School of Technical Training before working as the RAF's Deputy Director of Design.

Henry's elder brother, Thomas Reginald Cave-Browne-Cave CBE, also educated at Dulwich College and a Royal Navy engineering officer, specialised in airship research and design. The brothers transferred to the new-born RAF at identical rank and seniority. Thomas left the RAF when the Air Ministry discontinued work on airships following the R101 disaster. He was Professor of Engineering at University College, Southampton, from 1931 to 1950.

The summer of 1926 saw Cave-Browne-Cave promoted to group captain and appointed as Deputy Director of Technical Development several months later. He only worked in technical development for several months as in May 1927 he took up the post of Officer Commanding the Far East Flight. The Far East Flight was a newly created unit and it was established to prove that the RAF had the capability to reinforce the more remote parts of the British Empire. The Flight, led by Cave-Browne-Cave, departed Plymouth on 17 October 1927 and eventually arrived in Singapore on 28 February the next year. Cave-Browne-Cave then took the Far East Flight on a flying tour of Australia further demonstrating the increasing reach of British air power. After the Far East Flight returned to Singapore, it was redesignated No. 205 Squadron and Cave-Browne-Cave returned to England as a supernumerary within the headquarters of Coastal Area. The following summer, Cave-Browne-Cave returned to Singapore, resuming his former command in its upgraded form as No. 205 Squadron. At the start of 1930 he became the Officer Commanding RAF Base Singapore.

Back at the Air Ministry in London, Cave-Browne-Cave is credited as being the person who authorised the GBP 10,000 investment in the development of the Supermarine Spitfire in time for it to be the decisive fighter in the Battle of Britain.

On 17 January 1939, when flying out of RAF Eastchurch, Cave-Browne-Cave was seriously injured in a flying accident which occurred at Butley in Suffolk. His personal assistant, Flying Officer Geoffrey Beavis, was killed and Cave-Browne-Cave's active career came to an end.

== Notes ==
Military offices
New title Command established	Officer Commanding Far East Command; 1930	Succeeded by A H Jackson
Preceded by William Mitchell	Commandant of the RAF College Cranwell; 1934–1936	Succeeded by Jack Baldwin
