= Edmund Braye, 1st Baron Braye =

English nobleman (c.1484–1539)

Edmund Braye
- 1st Baron Braye
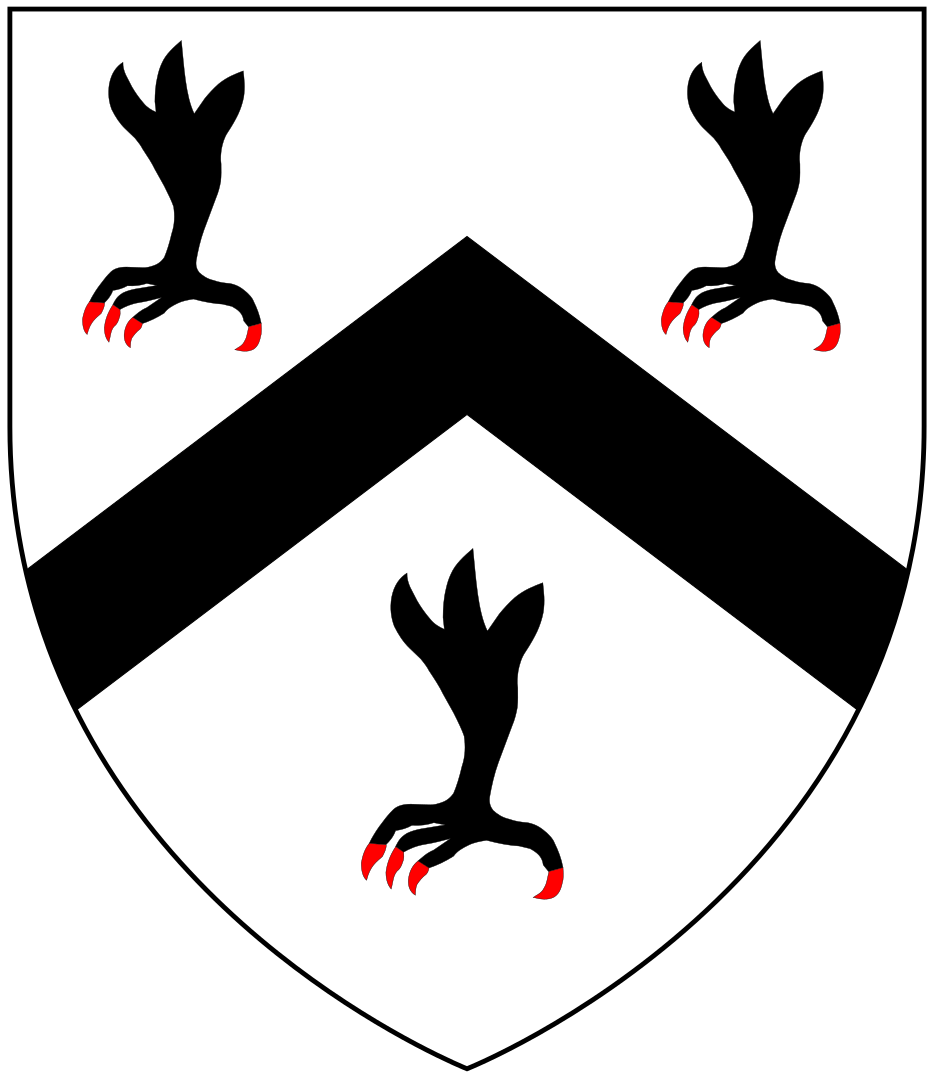
- Arms of Braye (modern): Argent, a chevron between three eagle's legs erased sable
- Died: 18 October 1539
- Noble family: Braye
- Spouse: Jane Halliwell
- Issue: John, Anne, Elizabeth, Frideswide, Mary, Dorothy, Frances
- Father: John Braye

Two versions of arms of Bray (ancient): left: Gules, three bends vair, as sculpted on monument in Cobham Church, Kent, of Lord Bray's daughter Ann Bray, wife of Baron Cobham; right: with tinctures reversed Vair, three bends gules as engraved on monumental brass in Aldbury Church, Hertfordshire, of Elizabeth Bray, another of Lord Bray's daughters, wife of Sir Ralph Verney

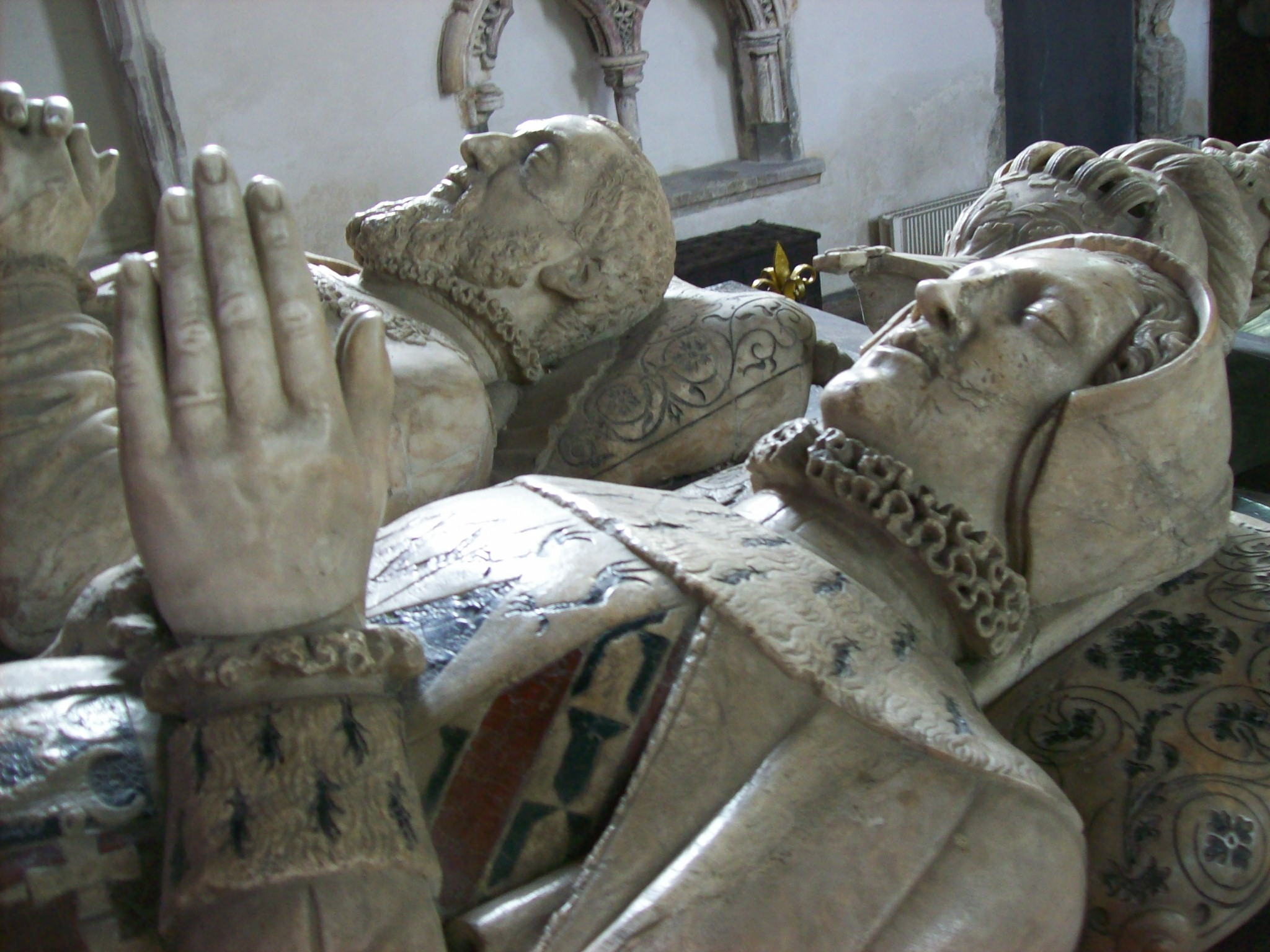
Effigy in St Mary Magdalene's Church, Cobham, Kent, of Lord Braye's daughter, Ann Bray, with her husband George Brooke, 9th Baron Cobham (d.1558)

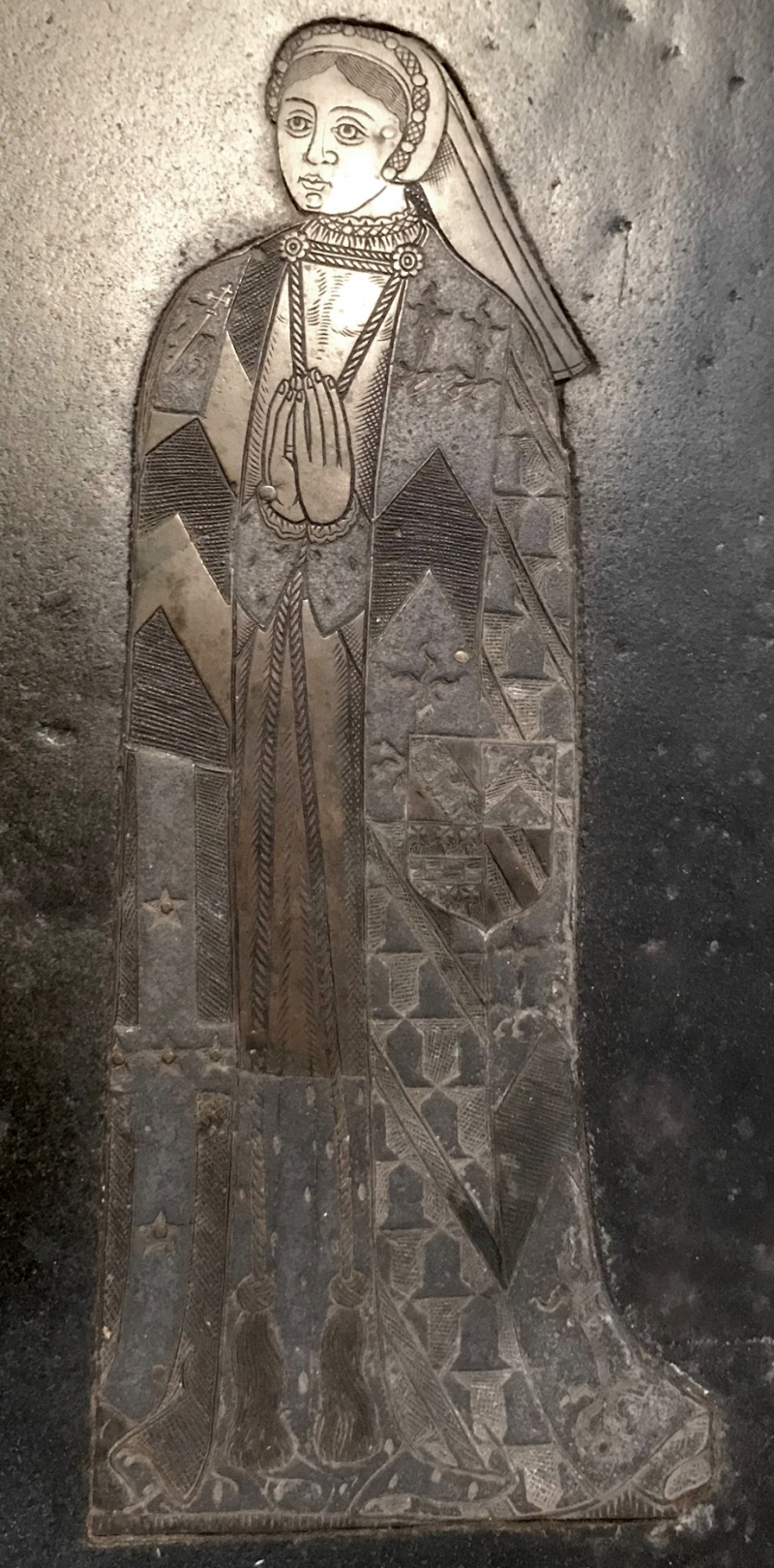
Monumental brass in Aldbury Church, Hertfordshire, of Lord Braye's daughter, Elizabeth Bray (d.1573), wife of Sir Ralph Verney. The inescutcheon of pretence of four quarters displays the arms of her heiress mother, Hallighwell, quartering Norbury, Boteler and Sudeley

Edmund Braye, 1st Baron Braye (or Bray; c. 1484 – 18 October 1539), of Eaton Bray in Bedfordshire, was an English peer.

== Origins ==
He was the son of John Braye lord of the manor of Eaton Bray in Bedfordshire; his younger brother was Sir Edward Braye. He inherited a large portion of the property of his uncle, Sir Reginald Bray, which was confirmed by a deed of settlement made between himself and William Sandys, 1st Baron Sandys and his wife Margery, "in adjustment of a dispute between the parties regarding the lands of the deceased".

== Career ==
He served as Sheriff of Bedfordshire for 1514 and as Sheriff of Sussex and Surrey in 1522. He was knighted in 1513 and, in 1529, he was summoned by writ to the House of Lords as Baron Braye, "of Eaton Bray in the County of Bedford".

The feudal barony of Eaton had been an ancient feudal barony seated at Eaton Castle. The manor of Eaton obtained the postscript "Bray" following his ownership, to distinguish it from other similarly named places. He was one of the Bedfordshire contingent in attendance on King Henry VIII when he met King Francois I of France at the Field of the Cloth of Gold in June 1520.

== Marriage and children ==
He married Jane Halwell (d. 24 Oct 1558) (alias Halgawell, Halliwell, Haleighwell, etc.), daughter and heiress of Sir Richard Halwell of Halwell near Harberton in Devon, by his wife Jane Norbury, daughter and heiress of John Norbury of Stoke d'Abernon in Surrey, (eldest son of Henry Norbury (d.1415) of Hoddesdon and Little Berkhamsted in Hertfordshire, a Member of Parliament for Bedfordshire in 1454 and 1454) the arms of which families were quartered by his descendants. By his wife he had issue one son and six daughters, as follows:

- John Braye, 2nd Baron Braye (d. 1557), eldest son and heir, who died childless when his heirs became his six sisters;
- Anne Bray (Lady Cobham), eldest daughter, who married George Brooke, 9th Baron Cobham (c1497 - 29 Sept 1558), lord of the manor of Cobham, Kent; her alabaster recumbent effigy survives, together with that of her husband, on their magnificent monument in St Mary Magdalene's Church, Cobham;
- Elizabeth Bray (d.1573), second daughter, who married Sir Ralph Verney (1509–1546), of Pendley in Tring, Hertfordshire, and of Middle Claydon, Buckinghamshire, whose monumental brasses with heraldic shields survive in the Church of St. John the Baptist, Aldbury, Hertfordshire. On her robe are engraved the arms of Verney (quarterly of four) impaling Bray (quarterly of four: 1&4: Bray modern; 2&3: Bray ancient, all charged with an inescutcheon of pretence of four-quarters: 1: Or, on a bend gules three goats argent (Hallighwell); 2: Sable, a chevron between three bull's heads cabossed argent (Norbury); 3: Gules, a fess chequy argent and sable between six crosslets formée fitchée argent (Boteler); 4: Or, two bends gules (Sudeley). She married secondly to Richard Catesby. Her sons included:
  - Edmund Verney (1528–58), of Pendley, eldest son and heir, twice MP for Buckinghamshire;
  - Francis Verney (1531/4-1559), of Salden in Mursley, Buckinghamshire, 4th son, also twice MP for Buckinghamshire;
  - Jane Verney, who married Sir Francis Hynde.
- Frideswide Bray, who married Sir Percyval Hart, chief sewer and knight harbinger to King Henry VIII;
- Mary Bray, who married George Peckham;
- Dorothy Bray (c.1524-1605) (Lady Chandos), youngest daughter, who married Edmund Brydges, 2nd Baron Chandos. She served as a Maid of Honour to three queens consort of King Henry VIII, namely Anne of Cleves, Catherine Howard and Catherine Parr.
- Frances Bray, who married Thomas Lefeild.

== Death and burial ==
He died in October 1539 and was succeeded in the barony by his son John Braye, 2nd Baron Braye (d. 1557).

== Sources ==
- Kidd, Charles, Williamson, David (editors). Debrett's Peerage and Baronetage (1990 edition). New York: St Martin's Press, 1990.
- Leigh Rayment's Peerage Pages

Political offices
Preceded by William Gascoigne	High Sheriff of Bedfordshire and Buckinghamshire; 1514–1515	Succeeded by Sir John St John
Peerage of England
New creation	Baron Braye; 1529–1539	Succeeded by John Braye
