= Genille Cave-Browne-Cave =

British soldier and adventurer (1869 - 1929)

The Reverend Sir Genille Cave-Browne-Cave Bt
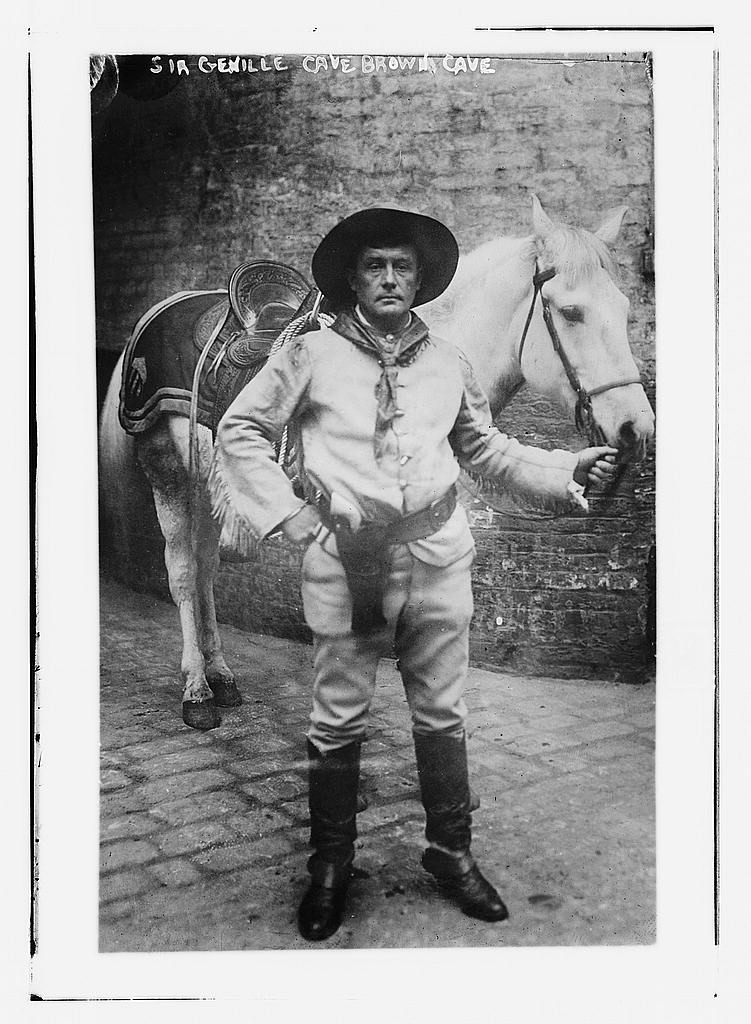
- Genille circa 1907-1910
- Born: Genille Cave-Browne-Cave; 1869
- Died: 1929 (aged 59–60)
- Title: 12th Baronet
- Term: 1907-1929
- Predecessor: Sir Mylles Cave-Browne-Cave, 11th Baronet, father
- Successor: Sir Reginald Ambrose Cave-Browne-Cave, 13th Baronet
- Parent: Sir Mylles Cave-Browne-Cave, 11th Baronet

Sir Genille Cave-Browne-Cave, 12th Baronet (1869–1929) was a British soldier and adventurer as well as the twelfth holder of the Cave-Browne-Cave baronetcy.

== Biography ==
He was the second son of Sir Mylles Cave-Browne-Cave, 11th Baronet (1822–1907). Genille's older brother died in 1880, making him the heir to the title. As a younger son with fewer expectations on him he had led an adventurous life, travelling to Africa, India and America. While in the United States he was "busting bronchos, roping steers, and herding cattle in the West." He became engaged to a Denver, Colorado maid before his accession to his title and fortune. He also fought in the Spanish-American War and the Boxer Rebellion, before becoming Captain in the Legion of Frontiersmen. In 1907 he succeeded his father as baronet in 1907, and later served in the Royal Garrison Artillery during the First World War. After the war he entered the Church, and was rector of Londesborough in Yorkshire until his death.

== Publications ==
- From Cowboy to Pulpit

== See also ==
- Cave-Browne-Cave baronets

Baronetage of England
Preceded by Mylles Cave-Browne-Cave	Baronet (of Stanford); 1907–1929	Succeeded by Reginald Cave-Browne-Cave
