= Robert Otway =

Royal Navy Admiral (1770–1846)

Admiral Sir Robert Otway GCB Bt
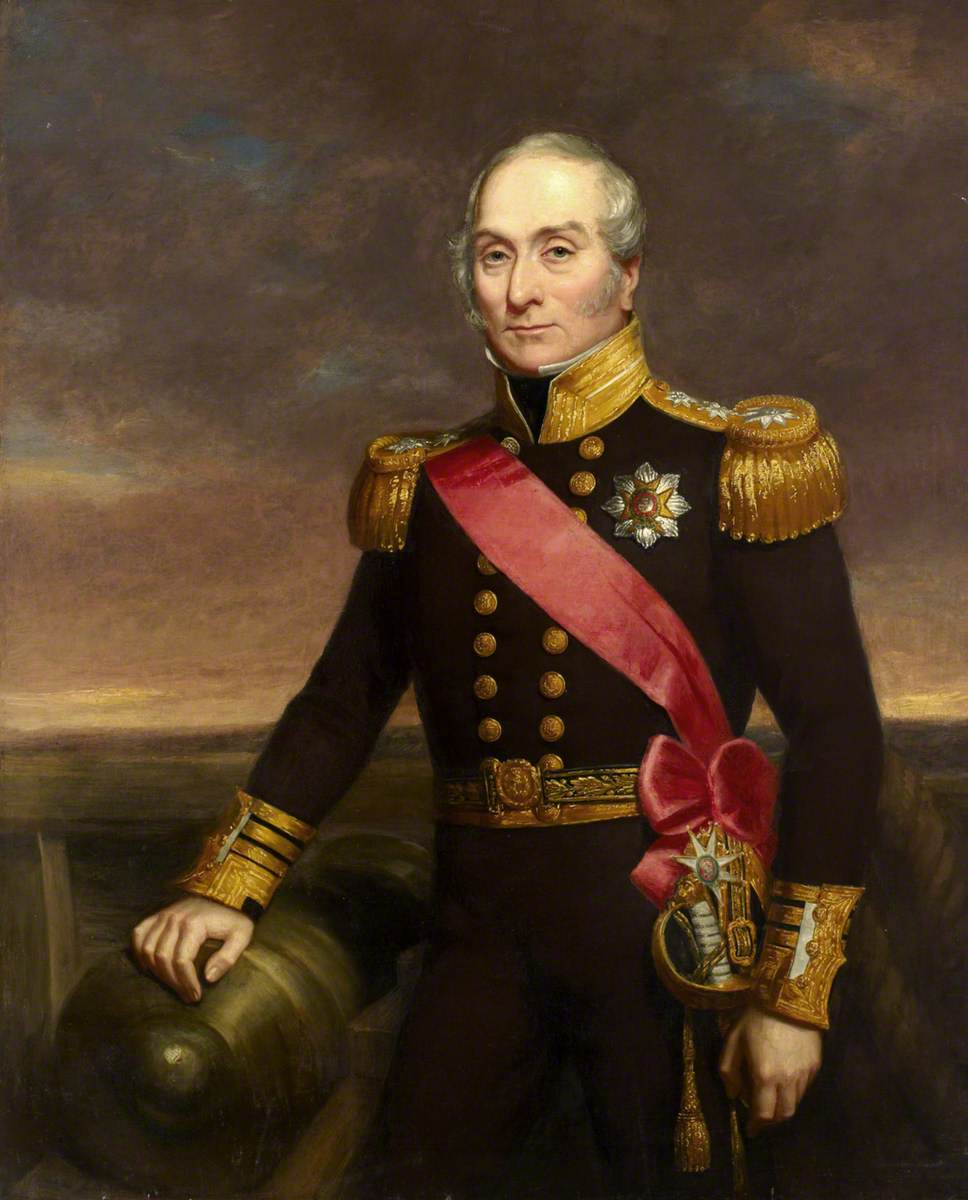
- Admiral Robert Waller Otway (1770–1846), from a painting attributed to John Lucas (1807–1874)
- Born: 26 April 1770; Castle Otway, County Tipperary
- Died: 12 May 1846 (aged 76)
- Military career
- Allegiance: United Kingdom
- Branch: Royal Navy
- Service years: 1784 to 1846
- Rank: Admiral
- Commands: Leith Station; South America Station; Commander-in-Chief, The Nore
- Conflicts: French Revolutionary Wars; Glorious First of June; Operations in the West Indies; Capture of Grenada; Battle of Copenhagen; Napoleonic Wars; Blockade of Brest; Blockade of Toulon; Siege of San Sebastian
- Awards: Baronetcy of Brighton; Knight Grand Cross of the Order of the Bath; Order of the Southern Cross

Admiral Sir Robert Waller Otway, 1st Baronet, GCB (26 April 1770 – 12 May 1846) was a senior Royal Navy officer of the early nineteenth century who served extensively as a sea captain during the Napoleonic War and later supported the Brazilian cause during the Brazilian War of Independence. During his long service, Otway saw action across Europe and in North America and was rewarded in his retirement with a knighthood, baronetcy, and position as a courtier within the Royal Household.

== Early career ==
Otway was born in the family home of Castle Otway (now ruined) in County Tipperary, Ireland, one of the very large families of Cooke and Elizabeth Otway. One of his younger brothers was Loftus Otway, later a significant army officer of the Peninsular War. Otway however, chose a navy career over his father's objections and became a midshipman in 1784 on the guardship HMS Elizabeth. Between 1785 and 1793, Otway experienced many transfers between ships, mainly operating on frigates in the Mediterranean, West Indies, and along the West African Coast. During this time he served on board HMS Phaeton, HMS Trusty and HMS Blonde, making lieutenant in the sloop HMS Falcon.

== French Revolutionary Wars ==
The eruption of the French Revolutionary Wars in 1793 brought Otway back to Europe as a lieutenant on the second-rate ship of the line HMS Impregnable with the Channel Fleet. Impregnable was flagship of Rear-Admiral Benjamin Caldwell, who was later to prove an important influence on Otway's career. Within a year of joining the large ship, Otway saw his first action in the massive fleet engagement of the Glorious First of June. Otway distinguished himself in the action by going aloft despite the heavy fire of the French fleet to repair the damaged fore topsail yard and thus allow Impregnable to engage the enemy closer. In the aftermath of the action, Caldwell publicly thanked Otway for his services and appointed him first lieutenant on Caldwell's new flagship, HMS Majestic.

With Majestic in the West Indies as personal favourite of the commander-in-chief, Otway was soon promoted again, becoming commander in early 1795 in command of the brig HMS Thorn. Between 1795 and 1800 as commander of Thorn and subsequently the frigates HMS Mermaid, HMS Ceres and HMS Trent, Otway became one of the most proficient and prolific commerce raiders in the Royal Navy, reputedly capturing or destroying over 200 French and Spanish vessels, making a fortune in prize money in the process. His exploits during this period included destroying, on two separate occasions, the sloops La Belle Créole and Courier National which were on passage to Guadeloupe with orders to massacre the French Royalist population there. He later supported insurgencies in French held Grenada and St. Vincent and also raided La Guayra in Venezuela in an unsuccessful effort to capture HMS Hermione, whose crew had mutinied, murdered their captain, Hugh Pigot, and turned her over to the Spanish.

Admiral Thomas Ussher, who served under Otway during this period, later reported "that no captain was more attentive to the comfort of his officers and men and that there was so much method in his manner of carrying on the service that, though in a constant state of activity, they had as much leisure as any other ship's company." He also commented that Otway insisted on inspecting every gun aboard after every action and led every coastal raid despite never mentioning this in his dispatches. In 1800, Otway returned to Europe and was made flag captain to Sir Hyde Parker in HMS Royal George and then HMS London. Otway was still at this post when Parker lead a fleet to the Baltic Sea to engage the League of Armed Neutrality which threatened Britain's trade routes in the region and he was an important contributor to the tactical planning of the Battle of Copenhagen. At Copenhagen, Otway's suggestion that Nelson lead the inshore squadron through the Sound yielded immediate results but when Admiral Parker lost his nerve and ordered Nelson to withdraw, the battle seemed in vain. Otway successfully mediated, mitigating the terms of Parker's signal and then taking a boat to Nelson on HMS Elephant and supporting Nelson's famous "failure" to see the signal.

== Napoleonic Wars ==
In the aftermath of the victory and the ensuing Peace of Amiens, Otway spent a period ashore in ill-health. During this time he married Clementina Holloway, daughter of Admiral John Holloway, with whom he would have twelve children. By 1804 he was sufficiently recovered to take command of HMS Montagu off Brest under Admiral William Cornwallis and whilst on this duty he participated in a brief artillery duel with the Alexandre during the French attempt to break the blockade in August 1805. The following year he participated in Sir Richard Strachan's operations in the Atlantic to intercept a French squadron eventually apprehended by another British squadron in the West Indies. In 1807, Otway sailed to Calabria to provide material and military aid to partisans and did the same in 1808 in Catalonia at the outbreak of the Peninsular War.

Taking over HMS Malta in 1809, Otway sailed for England before returning to the Mediterranean in the new HMS Ajax. He later commanded HMS Cumberland in the blockade off Toulon but suffered a recurring bout of ill-health in 1811 which necessitated a period in England recovering. He returned to service in 1813 and commanded Adamant at Leith, before returning to Ajax, which he sailed to the Bay of Biscay. The same year he used Ajax's guns to bombard the breaches of the Spanish fortress town of San Sebastian during the British siege.

In 1814, Otway convoyed merchant ships to Quebec and whilst in Canada was dispatched as a rear-admiral on a special commission to prepare the small ships squadron on Lake Champlain. The commission failed and the squadron was totally defeated at the Battle of Lake Champlain in September although Otway was not present.

== Brazil and retirement ==
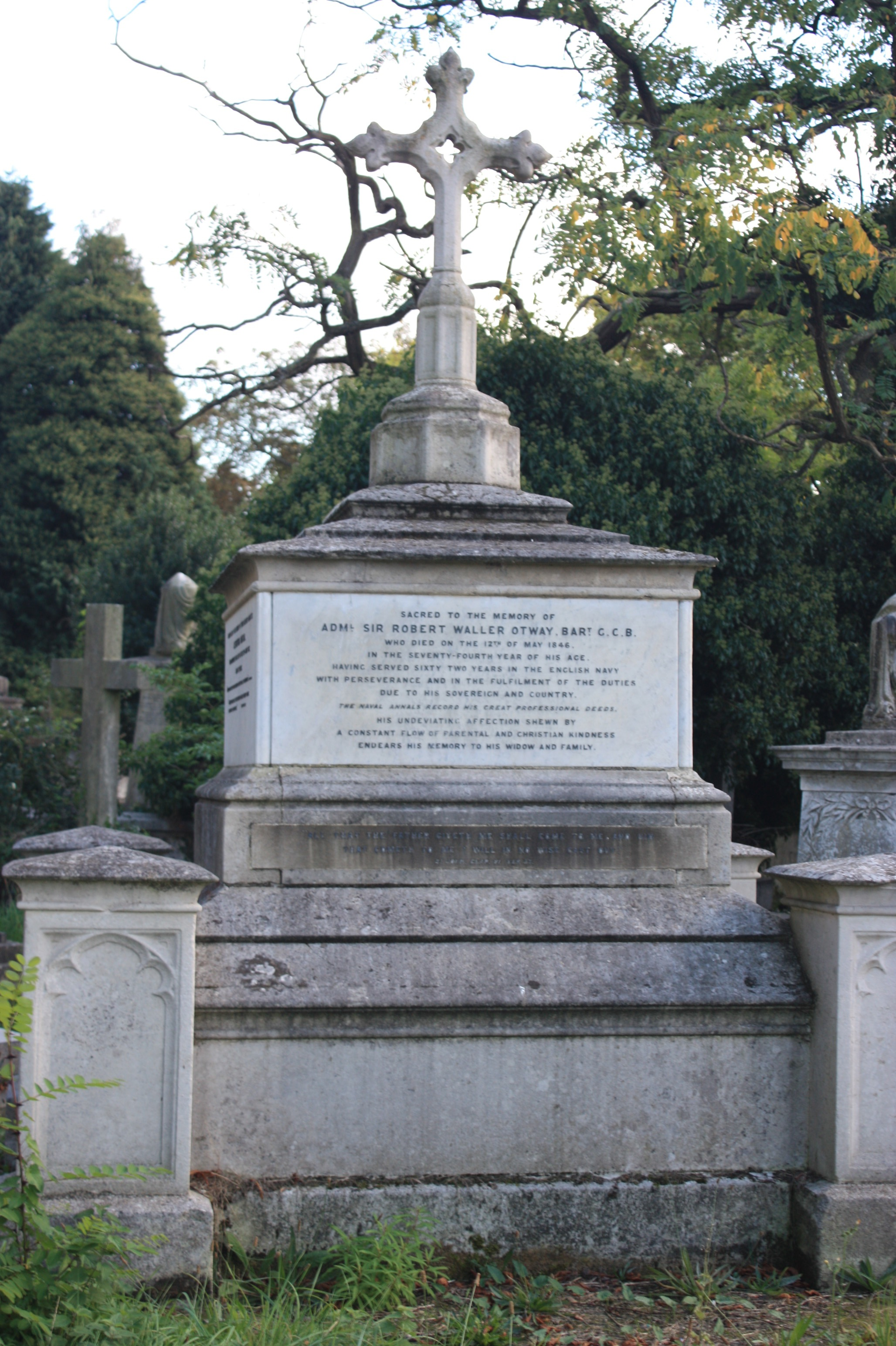
The grave of Admiral Robert Otway, Kensal Green Cemetery

In 1818, three years after the conclusion of the Napoleonic Wars, Otway was made Commander-in-Chief, Leith, a commission he performed so well in that in 1826 he was knighted into the Order of the Bath and sent as commander-in-chief to the South America Station. There Otway supported the Brazilian forces diplomatically, being presented with the Order of the Southern Cross. In 1829 he returned to Britain and enjoyed a quiet retirement as courtier, holding the office of Groom of the Bedchamber to King William IV. He was also promoted to full admiral and in 1831 made Baronet of Brighton for his services. His last appointment was as Commander-in-Chief, The Nore in 1837. He died suddenly in 1846, survived by his wife and eight of their twelve children. His two eldest sons had died in service with the Navy and so the baronetcy passed to his third son George Otway and then fourth son Arthur Otway in turn.

== Death ==
He died on 12 May 1846. He is buried in the northwest quadrant in the centre of Kensal Green Cemetery in London.

== See also ==
- O'Byrne, William Richard (1849). "Otway, Robert Waller" . A Naval Biographical Dictionary . John Murray – via Wikisource.

Baronetage of the United Kingdom
New creation	Baronet (of Brighton); 1831–1846	Succeeded by George Graham Otway
Military offices
New command	Commander-in-Chief, South America Station; 1826–1829	Succeeded by Thomas Baker
Preceded by Charles Elphinstone Fleeming	Commander-in-Chief, The Nore; 1837–1840	Succeeded by Sir Henry Digby
