= Theobald Mathew (legal humorist) =

British barrister and legal humorist

Theobald Mathew (5 December 1866 – 20 June 1939), known as Theo Mathew, was a British barrister and legal humorist.

== Life and legal career ==
Born in London, Mathew was the elder son of the Irish-born judge Sir James Charles Mathew and Elizabeth, née Biron, the daughter of a vicar. His great-uncle and namesake was the Irish temperance campaigner Father Theobald Mathew. His younger brother was the barrister and Labour MP Charles Mathew, while his sister Elizabeth was the wife of Irish Nationalist MP John Dillon. He was the uncle of Director of Public Prosecutions Sir Theobald Mathew and of Irish politician James Dillon.

Mathew was educated at The Oratory School and Trinity College, Oxford, where he obtained second-class honours in History in 1888. Like his father and brother, he was called to the bar at Lincoln's Inn in 1890, and practiced in the chambers of Joseph Walton, later a High Court judge. In 1896, Mathew became the editor of Commercial Cases, a series of law reports on the Commercial Court, which his father had helped to create, and in 1902, he published Practice of the Commercial Court.

Mathew had a large practice at the common law bar; after the First World War he frequently appeared in Canadian appeals to the Judicial Committee of the Privy Council. In his later years he became a libel specialist.

He was Recorder of Margate from 1913 to 1927 and Recorder of Maidstone from 1927 to 1936. Like his father, Mathew never took silk, but remained a junior at the common law bar until his seventies. He was elected a bencher of Lincoln's Inn in 1916. At the time of his death he has been scheduled to serve as treasurer of the Inn.

Mathew was a popular pupil master: among his pupils at 4 Paper Buildings were the future prime minister Clement Attlee (whose father was a friend of Mathew), Sir Stafford Cripps, Quintin Hogg, and Peter Thorneycroft.

== As a legal humorist ==
Mathew's fame among his contemporaries chiefly rests on his reputation as one of the greatest wits of his day. From 1925, writing under the pseudonym "O", he began to contribute a weekly series of "Forensic Fables" to the Law Journal, which he illustrated himself. The Fables mocked many leading legal personalities of the day, under thin disguise. These were subsequently published in four volumes between 1926 and 1932. In 1937, he published For Lawyers and Others, which brought his work to a broader audience.

He was also famous for his spontaneous witticisms. On one occasion, Mathew, upon meeting a white friend in the library of an Inn of Court which had many African members, greeted him with "Dr. Livingstone, I presume", a remark which was said to have "acquired legendary status during his lifetime".

== Family ==
In 1898, he married Ruth, daughter of the Rev George Henry Rigby and niece of the judge Sir John Rigby; they had five sons and two daughters.
