= Elizabeth Dillon (writer) =

Irish diarist and nationalist (1865–1907)

- Born: Elizabeth Mathew; 2 March 1865; Richmond, Surrey, England
- Died: 14 May 1907 (aged 42); Dublin, Ireland
- Burial place: Glasnevin Cemetery
- Spouse: John Dillon (m. 1895)
- Children: 6, including Myles Dillon and James Dillon
- Father: James Charles Mathew

Elizabeth Dillon (née Mathew; 2 March 1865 – 14 May 1907) was an Irish diarist and nationalist.

== Early life ==
Dillon was born Elizabeth Mathew at 6 Pembroke Villas, Richmond, Surrey, England, on 2 March 1865. Her parents were Sir James Charles Mathew and Elizabeth Blackmore Mathew, Dillon was the eldest of their five children. Her family were related to the Butler family, but Dillon did not visit Ireland until 1886. Living in Queen's Gate Gardens, Kensington, London, she was educated at home. From a young age she attended the ladies' gallery of the House of Commons, while mixing a busy social life with charitable works. Dillon began keeping a diary in 1879, which she would continue to write until her death. Her ancestor, Mary Mathew, was also a diarist and kept the diary for the discipline of the daily activity. She soon began to write for the love of it, and some have surmised she wrote with the intention her diaries would be read by others. She attended lectures in Old English and literature at King's College, London from late 1882 to 1884, and began to learn Irish in 1893.

== Political activism ==
Dillon's father supported land reform in Ireland, chaired the evicted tenants commission in 1892, and was a huge influence on her politics. She made her first political reference on 25 February 1883 when she noted the arrest of the Invincibles, and she then regularly commented on land reform. She travelled to Ireland for the first time in August 1886, staying in Killiney, County Dublin. In October 1886, she met John Dillon, and began to follow the Plan of Campaign so that she could discuss it with him during his visits to the Mathew house in London. During this time, John Dillon was deeply immersed in politics, and was imprisoned on a number of occasions. Being a careful follower of Irish politics, she became an anti-Parnellite. She confronted John Dillon in autumn 1895 about their relationship, saying that they could no longer meet as they had become the subject of gossip. He proposed within two weeks, and they were married on 21 November 1895 in Brompton Oratory. They were busy and often apart, with John having spend time in a warm climate due to his ill health. Dillon tried to accompany him when she could, but the couple's large family made that difficult.

== Family ==
They had one daughter and five sons, John Dillon (1896-1970), Anne Elizabeth Dillon (born 29 Oct 1897), Theobald Wolfe Tone (1898-1946), Myles Dillon (1900–1972), James Dillon (1902–1986), and Brian Dillon.

Finances were strained until John's uncle Charles bequeathed him his house, 2 North Great George's Street, Dublin in 1898, and a business in Ballaghadereen, County Mayo was bequeathed him by a cousin, Anne Deane, in 1905. Dillon ran the business successfully, while also carrying out duties as a politician's wife such as opening the Belfast ladies' branch of the United Irish League in June 1905. Her busy life resulted in her neglecting her diary.

== Death and legacy ==
Dillon died on 14 May 1907 in Dublin, having given birth to a stillborn daughter that morning. Pneumonia was given as the cause of death, but it could have been medical incompetence. She is buried in the family vault in Glasnevin Cemetery. Her husband wrote of her death in June 1907, A short narrative of the illness and death of my dearest love. Trinity College Dublin holds her diary and correspondence. Her diaries, edited by Brendan Ó Cathaoir, were published in 2019.
