= James Charles Mathew =

Irish-born judge (1830–1908)

The Right Honourable Sir James Charles Mathew
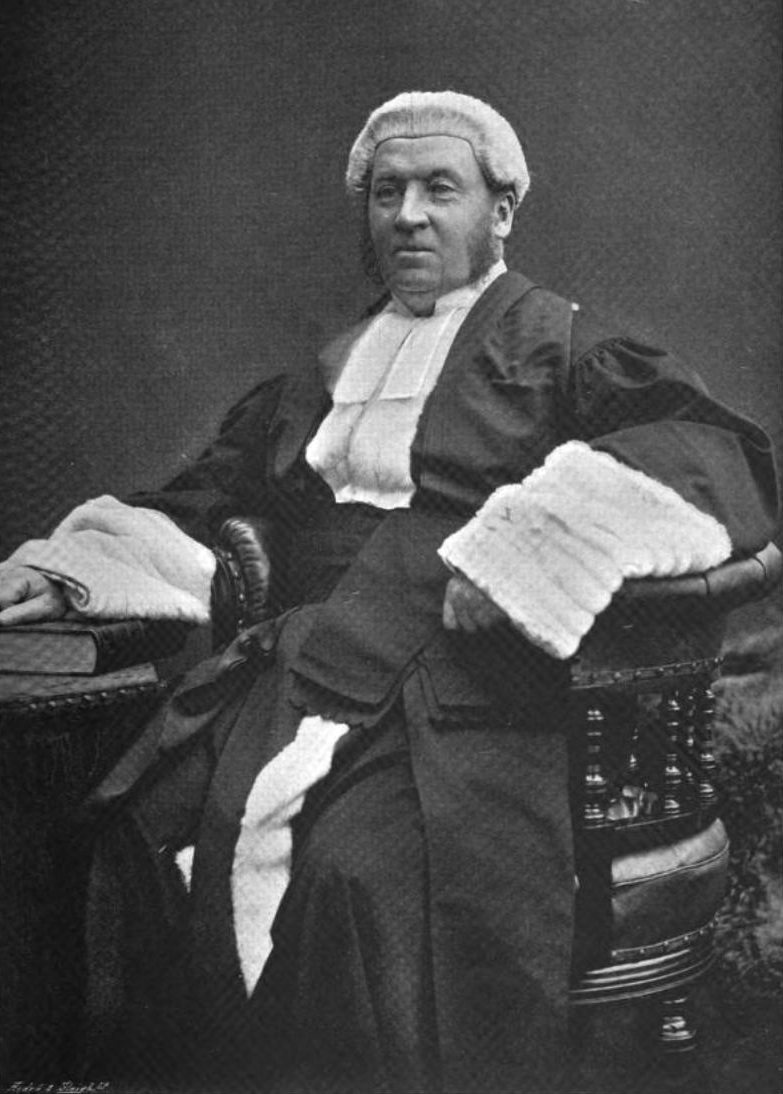
- In The Sketch, 29 April 1896

Lord Justice of Appeal
- In office 19 October 1901 – 25 January 1906

Justice of the High Court
- In office 3 March 1881 – 19 October 1901

Personal details
- Born: 10 July 1830 Lehenagh House, County Cork
- Died: 9 November 1908 (aged 78) London, England
- Resting place: St. Joseph's Cemetery, Cork
- Spouse: Elizabeth Biron (m. 1861)
- Children: 5, including Elizabeth, Theobald, and Charles
- Relatives: John Dillon (son-in-law); Myles Dillon (grandson); James Dillon (grandson)
- Education: Trinity College Dublin

Sir James Charles Mathew (10 July 1830 – 9 November 1908) was an Irish-born judge. Born in an Irish Catholic family in Cork, Mathew was educated at the largely Protestant Trinity College, Dublin, before joining the English bar. In 1881, although still a junior barrister, he was appointed to the High Court of Justice, where he sat in the Queen's Bench Division and was said to be the best nisi prius judge of his time. He was promoted to the Court of Appeal in 1901, before resigned from the bench for health reasons in 1905.

Mathew was a driving force behind the creation of Commercial List in 1895, the forerunner of the modern Commercial Court, and was the first judge in charge of the List.

== Early life and education ==
Mathew was born at Lehenagh House, County Cork, on 10 July 1830, the eldest son of Charles Mathew by his wife Mary, daughter of James Hackett of Cork. The Temperance campaigner Father Theobald Mathew was his uncle, and it was largely due to his representations that the nephew, after receiving his early education at a private school at Cork, was sent at the age of fifteen to Trinity College, Dublin, an unusual step at that period for a member of a Catholic family. He graduated as senior moderator and gold medallist in 1850, then entered as a student at Lincoln's Inn on 1 June 1851, and read in the chamber of Thomas Chitty. He was called to the bar in Hilary term 1851, having obtained in the previous November an open studentship. He was made a bencher in Easter term 1881.

== Career at the bar ==
For some ten years his progress was very slow. In the meantime he found scope for his debating and argumentative powers at the Hardwicke Society, of which he was one of the founders; and the humour and sarcasm which never forsook him brought him into prominence at the social gatherings of the Home Circuit mess. When business at last came to him, it found him thoroughly versed in the intricacies of pleading and practice and ready to seize every opportunity. He had a strong natural aptitude for the practical side of law, and from the outset of his career at the bar he showed impatience of technicalities and determination to get at the real points at issue. His services were in especial demand at the now defunct Guildhall sittings, where the heavy City special jury cases were tried, and after the way was cleared by Arthur Cohen being made a Queen's Counsel in 1874, Mathew and Charles Bowen were invariably retained by one side or the other; but in spite of his vast practice as a junior, Mathew steadily refrained from applying to become a QC: a weak and rather harsh voice may have rendered him distrustful of his powers as a leader. In 1873 he was among the treasury counsel on the prosecution of the Tichborne claimant, Arthur Orton, and he was the only one of his opponents with whom Edward Kenealy, his fellow Corkman, did not quarrel.

== Judicial career ==
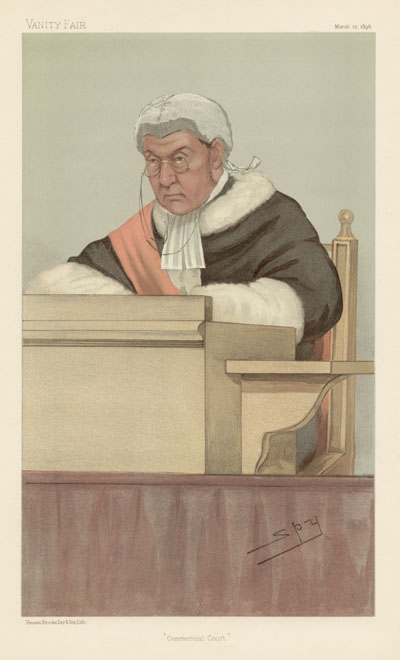
Caricature in Vanity Fair, 12 March 1896

In March 1881, though still a junior barrister, he was appointed a judge in the Queen's Bench Division and knighted. At first he was hardly the success on the bench that his friends had predicted. He was often over hasty in speech, and he showed himself too impatient of slowness and dulness. These defects, however, wore away, and he became eventually the best nisi prius judge of his time. On the criminal side, though his previous experience in that branch of the profession was small, he showed acuteness and broad common sense, with occasionally, as was observed, a slight leaning to the prisoner. But it is by the institution of the commercial court that he will be best remembered. He had always held strong views on the question of costs and of legal procedure, and shortly before his elevation to the bench he had served on a royal commission appointed to inquire into the former subject.

Mathew was an advocate of prison reform and for ten years was a member of the Humanitarian League's Criminal Law and Prison Reform Department.

=== Creation of the Commercial Court ===
In 1895 he persuaded the other judges of the Queen's Bench Division, in which Lord Russell of Killowen had just been appointed Chief Justice, to assent to the formation of a special list for commercial cases to be heard in a particular court, presided over by the same judge sitting continuously and with a free hand as to his own procedure. Of this office Mathew was the first and by far the most successful occupant. He swept away written pleadings, narrowed the issues to the smallest possible dimensions, and allowed no dilatory excuses to interfere with the speedy trial of the action. His own judgments, ‘concise and terse, free from irrelevancies and digression,’ won the approval of all who practised in the court, and the confidence of the mercantile community. To a man of Mathew's alert, energetic, and radical mind the procedure in Chancery, especially in chambers, seemed a cumbersome survival of medievalism; and when sitting occasionally as a chancery judge he tried to introduce some of the reforms he had found efficacious in the commercial court. But the soil was not congenial, and some of his criticisms caused a good deal of umbrage to the members of the Chancery bar.

=== Royal Commissioner ===
Shortly after the return of the Liberal Party to office in August 1892, Mathew was made chairman of a royal commission appointed to inquire into the case of the evicted tenants in Ireland, with especial reference to their reinstatement and resettlement. The selection was not very fortunate. As a convinced home ruler and the father-in-law of John Dillon, a leading Nationalist MP, he was regarded with distrust by the landlords and the Unionists generally.

The opening day, 7 November was marked by a disagreeable altercation between the chairman and Edward Carson. Following the example of Sir John Day at Belfast, Mathew refused to allow cross-examination by counsel. Carson thereupon stigmatised the inquiry as 'a sham and a farce,' and Mathew pronounced this observation to be 'impertinent and disgraceful to the Irish bar.' Counsel were ordered to withdraw, two of the chairman's colleagues took speedy opportunity of resigning, and the landlords as a body refused to take any further part in the proceedings. The commission, however, continued to take evidence, and reported in due course; some of its recommendations bore fruit in the clauses of George Wyndham's Land Purchase (Ireland) Act (1903). It should be said that the lines of procedure laid down by Mathew have been consistently followed in subsequent royal commissions.

=== Court of Appeal and death ===
Probably owing to this episode Mathew was not raised to the Court of Appeal until 1901. When Lord Halsbury proposed Mathew's elevation as Lord Justice of Appeal, Lord Salisbury considered "making [Joseph] Walton Lord Justice at once over Mathew's head". In the end, Mathew was duly promoted, and Walton replaced him on the High Court bench. In his new capacity he displayed all his old qualities of accuracy, common sense, and vigour, but he deprecated elaborate arguments and voluminous citation of authorities, the 'old umbrellas of the law,' as he used to call them. On 6 December 1905 he was seized with a paralytic stroke at the Athenæum Club, and his resignation was announced on the following day. He died in London on 9 November 1908, and was buried in St. Joseph's Cemetery at Cork.

== Assessment ==
Biographer James Beresford Atlay described Mathew as a representative figure of the south of Ireland and characterized him as an able speaker with a sense of humor. Atlay also described him as holding radical political views and as a Roman Catholic, and stated that he maintained cordial relations with people who disagreed with him in religion and politics, including clergy of the Church of England whom he visited while on circuit. Atlay further characterized him as well read and culturally informed, and as maintaining close friendships.

== Family ==
Mathew married on 26 December 1861 Elizabeth, daughter of Edwin Biron, vicar of Lympne near Hythe; she survived him. There were two sons and three daughters of the marriage.

His eldest daughter Elizabeth married in 1895 the Irish MP John Dillon, and was the mother of the Irish politician James Matthew Dillon.

Both of Mathew's sons became barristers. The elder, Theobald Mathew, was a well-known legal wit, while the younger, Charles Mathew KC, was briefly a Labour MP. Charles Mathew's son, Sir Theobald Mathew, was the longest-serving Director of Public Prosecutions.
