= Sarah Cecilia Harrison =

Irish artist

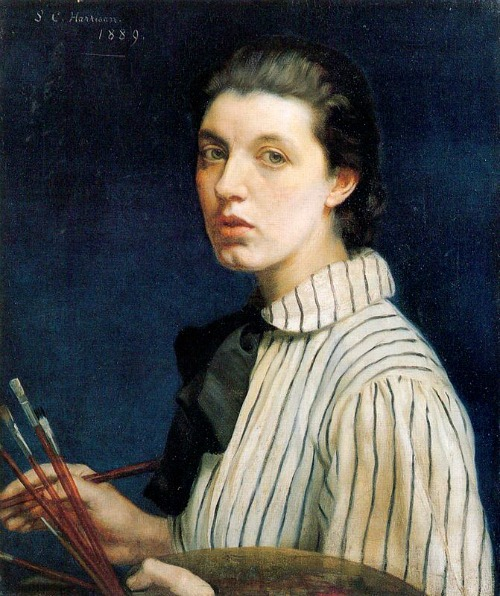
- Self-portrait (1889)
- Born: 21 June 1863; Holywood, County Down, Ireland
- Died: 23 July 1941 (aged 78); Drumcondra, Dublin, Ireland
- Resting place: Mount Jerome, Dublin
- Education: Slade School of Fine Art
- Years active: 1886–1933
- Known for: Painting, Portraits
- Movement: Modernism
- Family: Henry Harrison (brother)

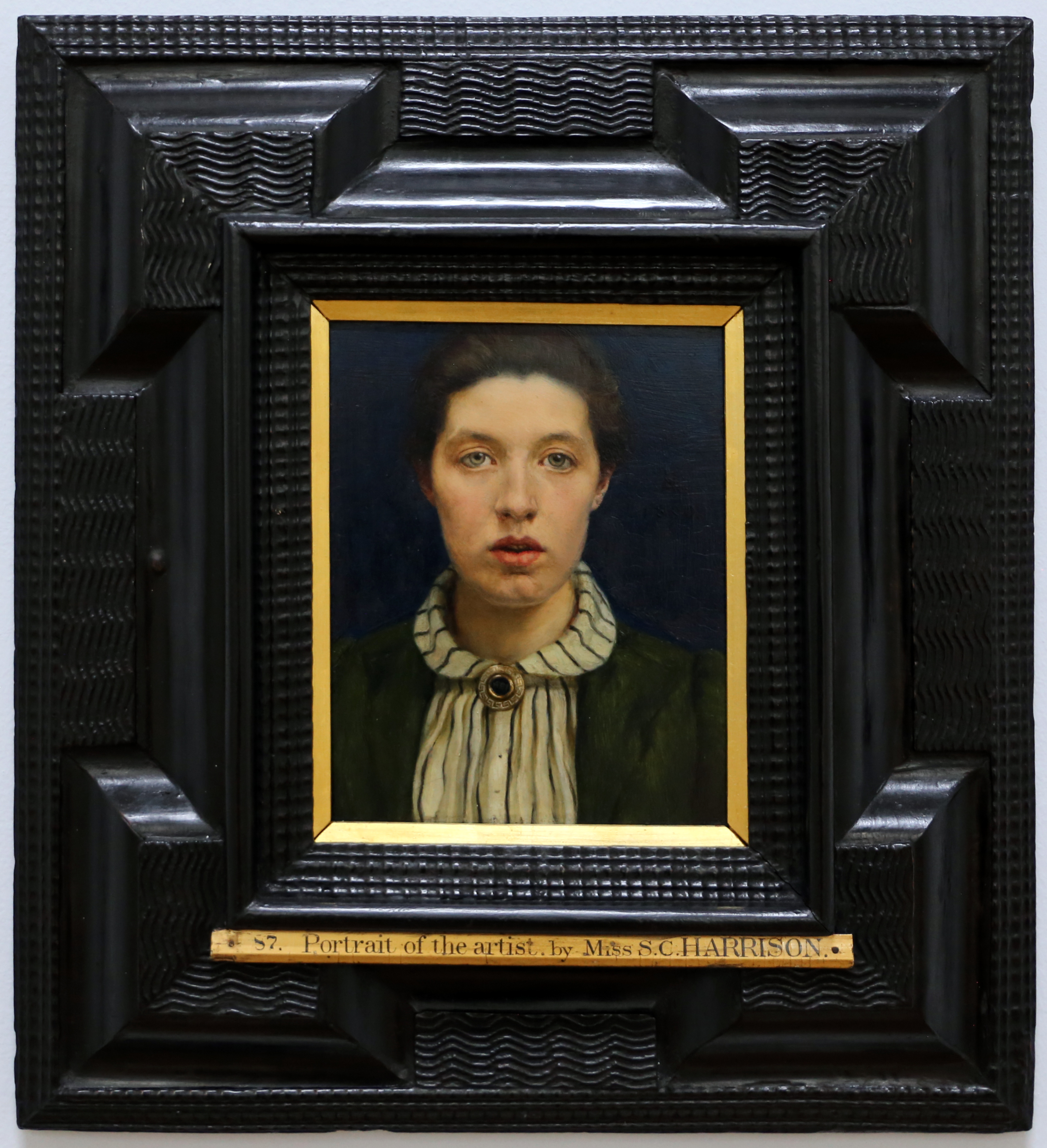
1890 self-portrait, currently on display in the Hugh Lane Gallery.

Sarah Cecilia Harrison (21 June 1863 – 23 July 1941) was an Irish artist and the first woman to serve on Dublin City Council.

== Early life and education ==
Harrison, who went by the name Cecilia, was born to an affluent family in Holywood House, in Holywood, County Down. She was the third child of Letitia (nee Tennent) and landowner Henry Harrison JP (d. 1873). One of her brothers was politician and writer Henry Harrison, a supporter of Charles Stewart Parnell. Her maternal grandfather was Robert James Tennent, a liberal MP for Belfast. She was the great grand-niece of United Irishman and industrialist Henry Joy McCracken and the social reformer and anti-slavery campaigner Mary Ann McCracken. At the age of ten her father died and she and her family relocated to London.

Harrison studied at Queen's College, London where she was awarded a silver medal by University College, London, for painting from the antique style. She studied under Alphonse Legros at the Slade School of Fine Art from 1878 to 1885 and won the Slade scholarship. She travelled widely on the continent as part of her studies including Paris, Italy and Amsterdam.

== Career ==
In 1889 Harrison moved to Dublin and established herself as one of Ireland's foremost portrait artists. She submitted 60 paintings to the Royal Hibernian Academy's annual exhibition and numerous other works to the Royal Academy in London during her career. She was an honorary academician of the Royal Ulster Academy of Fine Arts.

Harrison's brother, Henry, was a supporter of Charles Stewart Parnell and a Member of Parliament for Mid Tipperary. Harrison herself became the first female city councillor for Dublin Corporation in 1912. She campaigned to have poor relief extended to the able-bodied unemployed and worked to promote women's rights. She was closely involved in Hugh Lane's efforts to establish a gallery of modern art in Dublin.

Following Lane's death on the Lusitania in 1915, she claimed that they had been engaged to be married. Her 1914 portrait of Lane is one of her best-known works. Harrison never married.

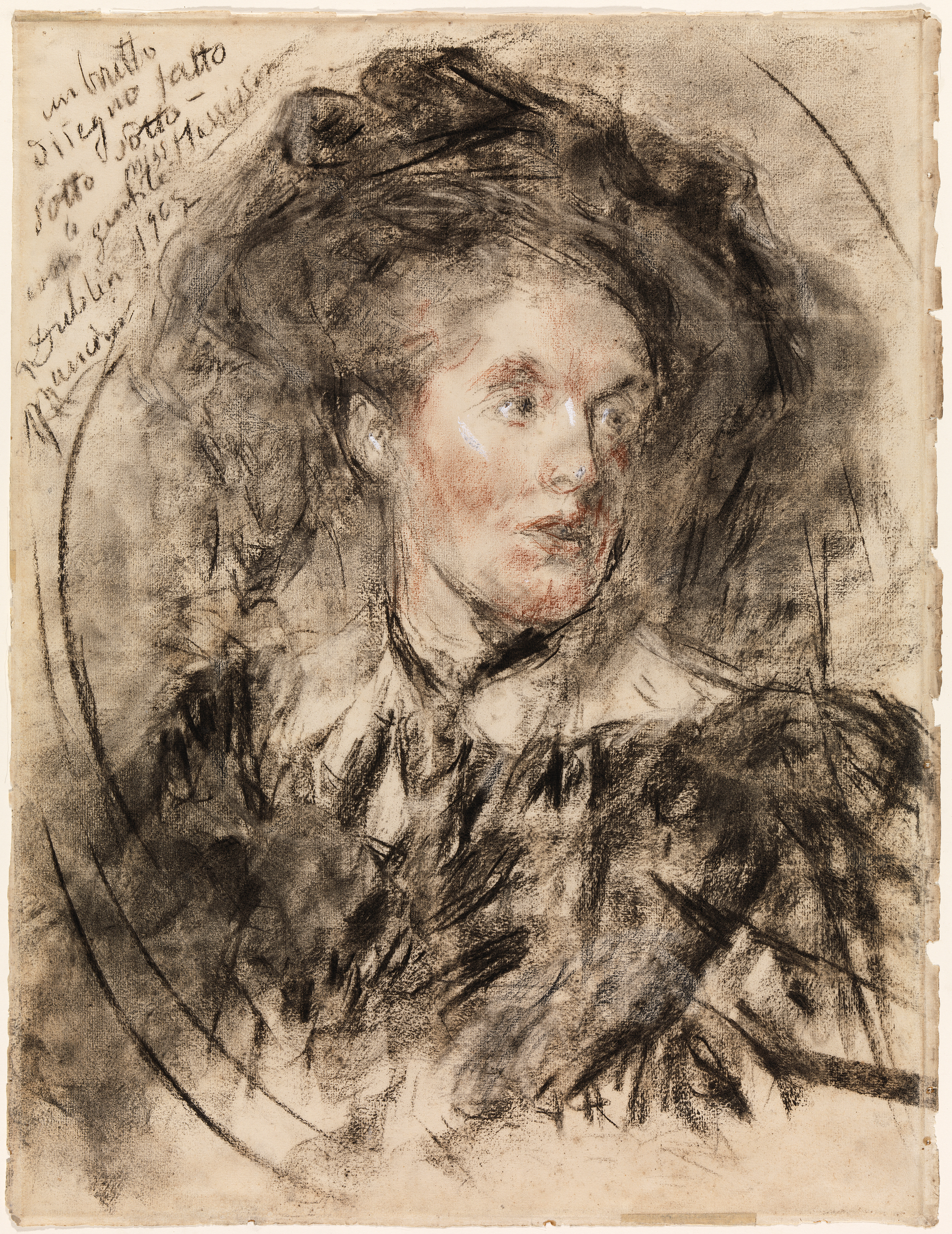
Portrait of Harrison by Antonio Mancini, 1909

== Death and legacy ==
Harrison is buried in Mount Jerome Cemetery, the inscription on her gravestone reads ‘Artist and Friend of the Poor’.

Harrison's artistic style is precise and realistic. There are examples of her work in the collections of the National Gallery of Ireland, the Hugh Lane Gallery, the Office of Public Works, the Scottish National Portrait Gallery, the Ulster Museum and National Museums Northern Ireland. Sarah Cecilia Harrison is known as an artist, nationalist, social reformer and feminist. Cecilia Harrison became a well known portrait artist. On 24 November 2014 Harrison's 'Portrait of a Young Lady Reading' sold at auction for €6,600.

== Feminism ==
For some 30 years Sarah was part of social reform and women's rights in Ireland. In 1912 she was the first woman to be elected to the Dublin City Council. Here she worked closely with Alderman Alfie Byrne. Sarah is also recognised for her prominent place in the suffrage victory procession and escorting Anna Haslam to vote in the Williams Street Courthouse, Dublin, in the 1918 general election

== Well-known works ==
Portrait of Henry Joy McCracken which is shown in the Ulster Museum.

Portrait of Hugh Lane.

Portrait of Scottish Writer 1897.
