= 1890 Mid Tipperary by-election =

UK Parliamentary by-election

The 1890 Mid Tipperary by-election was a parliamentary by-election held for the United Kingdom House of Commons constituency of Mid Tipperary on 15 May 1890. The vacancy arose because of the resignation of the sitting member, Thomas Mayne of the Irish Parliamentary Party. Only one candidate was nominated, Henry Harrison of the Irish Parliamentary Party, who was elected unopposed.
