= James Dillon (Fine Gael politician) =

Irish politician (1902–1986)

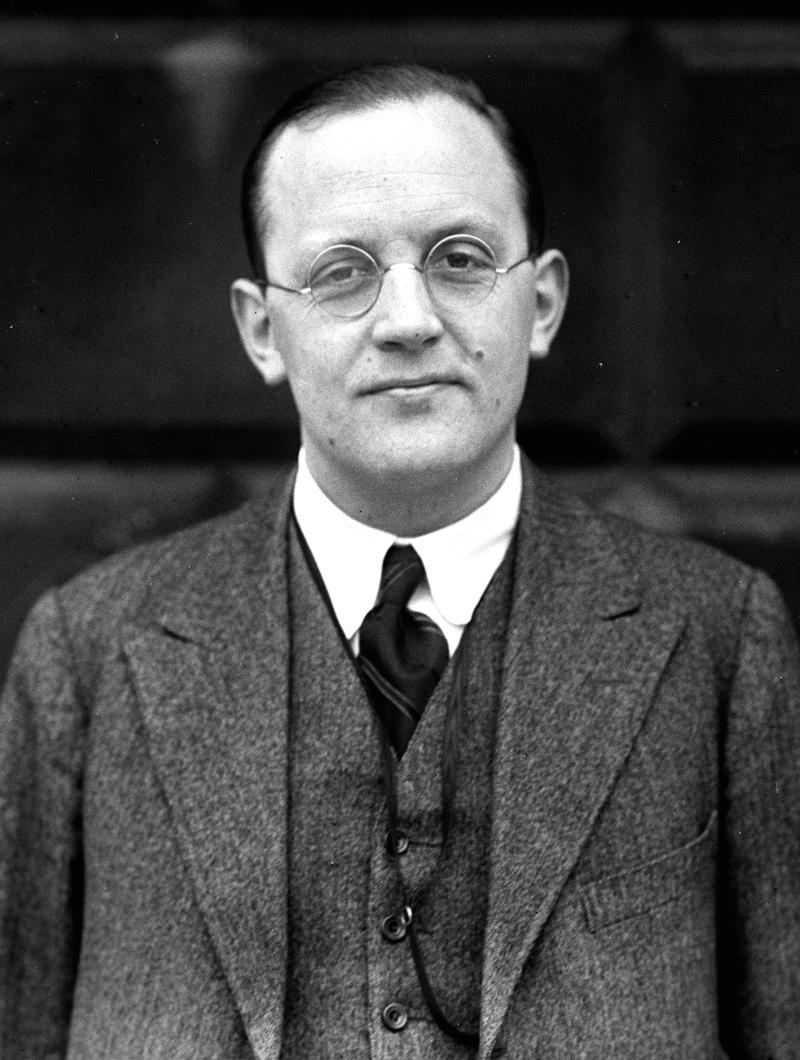
- Dillon, c. 1930s

Leader of the Opposition
- In office 21 October 1959 – 21 April 1965
- Taoiseach: Seán Lemass
- Preceded by: John A. Costello
- Succeeded by: Liam Cosgrave

Leader of Fine Gael
- In office 21 March 1959 – 21 April 1965
- Preceded by: Richard Mulcahy
- Succeeded by: Liam Cosgrave

Minister for Agriculture
- In office 2 June 1954 – 20 March 1957
- Taoiseach: John A. Costello
- Preceded by: Thomas Walsh
- Succeeded by: Frank Aiken
- In office 18 February 1948 – 13 June 1951
- Taoiseach: John A. Costello
- Preceded by: Paddy Smith
- Succeeded by: Thomas Walsh

Teachta Dála
- In office July 1937 – June 1969
- Constituency: Monaghan
- In office February 1932 – July 1937
- Constituency: Donegal

Personal details
- Born: 26 September 1902 Dublin, Ireland
- Died: 10 February 1986 (aged 83) Ballaghaderreen, County Roscommon, Ireland
- Party: Fine Gael (1933–1942, 1952–1986)
- Other political affiliations: National Centre Party (1932–1933); Independent (1942–1952)
- Spouse: Maura Phelan (m. 1942)
- Children: 1
- Parents: John Dillon (father); Elizabeth Mathew (mother)
- Relatives: Myles Dillon (brother); John Blake Dillon (paternal grandfather); James Charles Mathew (maternal grandfather)
- Education: University College Dublin; King's Inns

James Mathew Dillon (26 September 1902 – 10 February 1986) was an Irish Fine Gael politician, barrister and businessman who served as Leader of the Opposition and Leader of Fine Gael from 1959 to 1965, and as Minister for Agriculture from 1948 to 1951 and again from 1954 to 1957. He was a Teachta Dála (TD) for thirty-seven years, sitting continuously from 1932 to 1969, initially as an independent, then as a founder member of Fine Gael, then again as an independent following his resignation from the party in 1942, and finally as a member of Fine Gael once more from 1952.

The son of John Dillon, the last leader of the Irish Parliamentary Party, and grandson of the Young Irelander John Blake Dillon, Dillon grew up steeped in constitutional nationalist politics. He trained as a businessman before qualifying as a barrister, and entered politics as an independent TD for Donegal in 1932. He was among the founders of the National Centre Party and, in 1933, of Fine Gael itself.

A fervent opponent of Nazism and of Irish neutrality during the Second World War, Dillon resigned from Fine Gael in 1942 after urging the state to align itself with the Allies, a stance that left him politically isolated for the remainder of the war. He rejoined the party in 1952 and went on to serve twice as Minister for Agriculture in inter-party governments, where he was noted for his land reclamation schemes and his promotion of Irish farm produce. As leader of Fine Gael from 1959, he was the first person to lead the party who had not come from the revolutionary Sinn Féin tradition, but he struggled to reconcile the party's conservative wing with reformers such as Declan Costello, whose "Just Society" programme he embraced only reluctantly. He resigned the leadership after Fine Gael's failure to unseat Fianna Fáil at the 1965 general election, and retired from the Dáil in 1969.

Widely regarded as one of the outstanding parliamentary orators of 20th-century Ireland, and described by one reviewer of his biography as the "most exotic leader of Fine Gael", Dillon was noted for his combative wit, his flamboyant personal style, and his willingness to hold unpopular positions. He died in Ballaghaderreen, County Roscommon, in 1986.

== Early life and education ==
James Mathew Dillon was born on 26 September 1902 at 2 North Great George's Street, Dublin, the fifth of six children, and youngest son, of John Dillon, Nationalist MP for Mayo East, and his wife Elizabeth, daughter of Sir James Charles Mathew, a judge of the High Court in London and a nephew of the temperance campaigner Father Theobald Mathew. His mother died in 1906, when he was four years old, and he was subsequently raised by his father and a succession of nurses, in what his biographer Maurice Manning described as "a bleak and intensely high-minded upbringing".

He was educated privately before attending Mount St Benedict's school in Gorey, County Wexford, from 1915 to 1919, a nominally Benedictine institution run according to the eccentric views of Father John Sweetman, a cleric of advanced Sinn Féin sympathies. Although Dillon later claimed to have learned little there, he developed a good grasp of history, became a proficient debater and actor, and campaigned in Wexford for the Irish Party candidate Sir Thomas Esmonde at the 1918 Irish general election, despite the school's prevailing sympathy for Sinn Féin.

Dillon moved to University College Dublin in 1919 to study commerce, but left in 1921 without taking a degree, having devoted himself chiefly to student politics and debating. He was an unfashionable defender of the Irish Parliamentary Party against the rising tide of Sinn Féin, and quickly gained a reputation as an outstanding, if old-fashioned, debater. At UCD he was later remembered as one of "the last frontiersmen" of the Irish Parliamentary Party tradition.

Although he would have preferred to study medicine, Dillon acquiesced to his father's wish that he take over the family's merchant business, Monica Duff's, in Ballaghaderreen, County Roscommon, a store that his grandfather John Dillon had been left by a cousin, Anne Deane, who had built it into one of the best-known shops in the west of Ireland. He trained in business methods at Selfridges in London and at Marshall Field's in New York and Chicago, returning to Ireland in 1924 to take control of, and modernise, the family firm, which a British diplomat later described as "a chain of provincial stores...rather analogous to Selfridges" operating in the west of Ireland. In his spare time he studied for the bar, being called in 1931, though he never practised as a barrister.

== Early political career ==
=== Independent TD and the National Centre Party ===
Dillon did not long resist the appeal of politics. He flirted with the National League Party that emerged in 1927 but declined an offer to stand for the Dáil, and he was later approached both by Éamon de Valera, to stand for Fianna Fáil, and by W. T. Cosgrave, before deciding to run as an independent for Donegal in 1932. Though he had little personal connection to the county, his father's name and the support of the Ancient Order of Hibernians, which remained influential in Donegal, secured his election; he remained a committed supporter of the order for the rest of his life.

In an unpublished memoir, Dillon later recalled the volatile atmosphere surrounding the change of government that followed the 1932 election, claiming that some Fianna Fáil deputies had entered Leinster House on the day of the decisive Dáil vote carrying revolvers, and that he had witnessed a senior party figure assembling a machine gun in a telephone booth within the building.

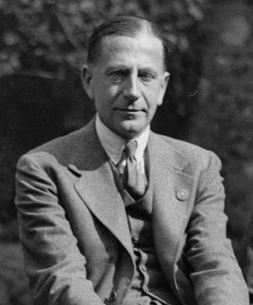
Frank MacDermot was a key ally to Dillon in the early party of his political career

In the Dáil, Dillon initially supported de Valera for president of the Executive Council, but grew increasingly opposed to Fianna Fáil's economic policy, particularly the economic war with Britain. He made common cause with a number of farmer-based independents, most prominently Frank MacDermot, and in late 1932 emerged with MacDermot as joint leader of the new National Centre Party, which grew out of the National Farmers' and Ratepayers' League formed that October. De Valera's snap general election of January 1933 forced the fledgling party into a sudden campaign, during which meetings addressed by Dillon and MacDermot were disrupted by Fianna Fáil and Irish Republican Army (IRA) supporters; the party nonetheless won eleven seats.

=== Formation of Fine Gael and the Blueshirts ===
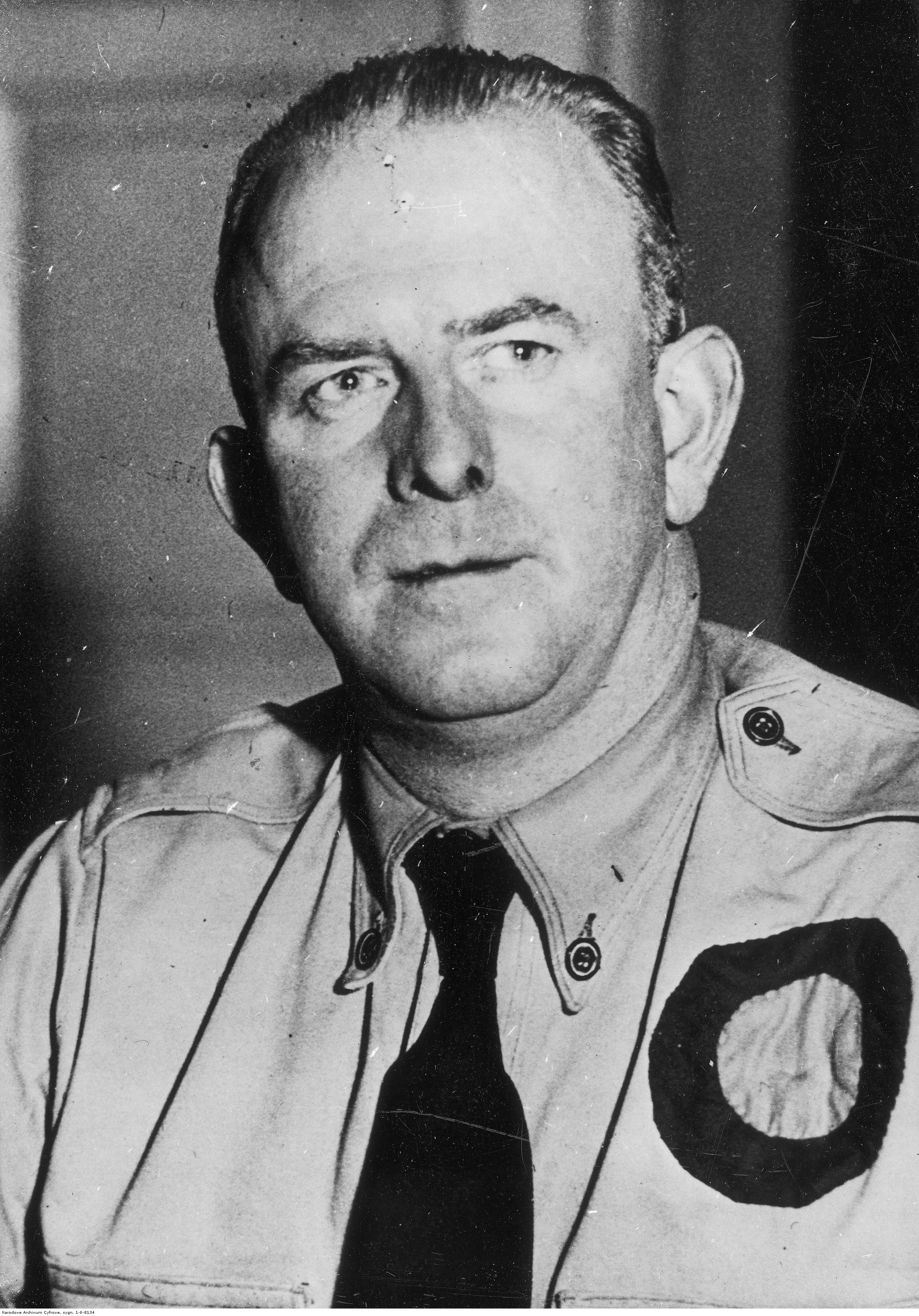
Dillon had a complex relationship with Eoin O'Duffy, leader of the Blueshirts.

In 1933 Dillon played a leading part in bringing together Cumann na nGaedheal, the Centre Party and the emerging Blueshirt movement to form Fine Gael, initially led by the former Garda commissioner Eoin O'Duffy. Barely eighteen months into his political career, Dillon found himself a vice-president of the second-largest party in the state. Seán Lemass later dismissed the new triple grouping as the "Cripple Alliance".

Dillon had earlier recommended O'Duffy to Cosgrave's party as a leader of the opposition to de Valera, on the grounds that it was "unsafe to leave him outside". He and MacDermot nonetheless grew alarmed at O'Duffy's increasingly authoritarian and pro-fascist pronouncements. MacDermot formally protested in July 1934 against the tendency of some Blueshirt speakers to attack the parliamentary system, and in January 1935 Dillon privately observed that O'Duffy "has returned from his interview with Mussolini definitely fascist". On another occasion, exasperated by O'Duffy's habit of abandoning his prepared script, Dillon remarked to him: "When you stick to your notes, General, you're the greatest speaker there is. But let some old woman in the audience shout 'Up Dev' and God knows what you will say next." Despite this, Dillon maintained throughout his life that the Blueshirts had preserved freedom of speech and assembly in the state, and dismissed with contempt the suggestion that the movement itself had posed a fascist threat.

By 1934, a British diplomat recorded Dillon's assessment that Cosgrave was a "spent force", that MacDermot lacked any special aptitude for politics, and that O'Duffy, having started as the idol of the army and the Garda Síochána, was "rapidly qualifying to be the only person" with a realistic chance of unseating de Valera. Dillon considered himself, in effect, the mainstay of the party in parliament at the time. Fine Gael did not achieve its primary objective of displacing Fianna Fáil, and Dillon remained one of its most vigorous members through the 1930s. When Donegal was divided into two constituencies he transferred without difficulty to Monaghan in 1937, a seat he held until his retirement in 1969.

Dillon took a keen interest in continental affairs from an early stage and warned against the threat German fascism posed to democracy and international order. He was also markedly hostile to communism: during a Dáil debate in February 1937, in which Fine Gael pressed the government to recognise Franco's forces in the Spanish Civil War, Dillon argued that "the fundamental issue is God or no God".

== Opposition to neutrality and resignation from Fine Gael ==
Dillon was one of the few Irish politicians to take an informed and early interest in the rise of European fascism. As deputy leader of Fine Gael on the outbreak of the Second World War in 1939, he initially supported the government's policy of neutrality, appearing on all-party recruiting platforms to encourage enlistment in the Defence Forces. Privately, however, he came to believe that Ireland's security depended on an Allied victory, and that the state ought to give the Allies every assistance short of formally entering the war. He described the Nazi creed as "the devil himself with twentieth-century efficiency", a stance that drew the ire of the German minister to Ireland, Eduard Hempel, who denounced him as a "Jew" and a "German-hater".

Diplomat David Gray wrote that, amid the collapsing western front in June 1940 and panic over a heightened threat from Germany, Dillon proposed bringing the Free State into an all-island defence arrangement led by the French with the British. This, he felt, would prompt the Americans to arm the Irish, something they were reluctant to do otherwise. Gray reported the idea to Roosevelt.

Dillon made his position public at the Fine Gael ard fheis of February 1942, arguing that "resistance to evil and injustice is the affair... of every Christian man" and that "no prudent man will minimise that danger; no just man will deride that fear". The Fianna Fáil deputy Andrew Fogarty reportedly threatened to "put him out quick, the corner boy". Dillon's stance left his party no option but to expel him, though he in fact resigned before he could be pushed. His close friend Peter Nugent resigned from Fine Gael over the same issue.

Even de Valera, then Taoiseach, was not spared Dillon's rhetoric. When de Valera ridiculed Dillon's pro-Allied stance as effectively pro-British, Dillon retorted:

My ancestors fought for Ireland down the centuries on the continent of Europe (Note: Dillon was suggesting his ancestors were members of the Wild Geese; Irishmen who fought as foreign soldiers for Catholic nations in Enlightment era Europe) while yours were banging banjos and bartering budgies in the backstreets of Barcelona. (Note: Dillon was mocking de Valera's Spanish hertiage)

As an independent TD, Dillon found himself politically isolated; his telephone was tapped and his speeches censored. The minister for the co-ordination of defensive measures, Frank Aiken, personally prevented newspapers from reporting a pro-Allied speech by Dillon, as well as basic factual accounts of Nazi atrocities. Dillon and MacDermot were among the few members of the Oireachtas who attempted to challenge the more absurd applications of wartime censorship in the Dáil and Seanad, though Aiken conceded nothing. One unnamed Fianna Fáil opponent said of him that he stood "abhorred by this party, cast out by the Fine Gael party, avoided by Labour, shunned like a plague by Clann na Talmhan... in abject isolation". Despite this, Dillon was re-elected as an independent in the general elections of 1943 and 1944, and remained one of the most assiduous, and colourful, contributors to the work of the Dáil. The American wartime minister, David Gray, counted Dillon among his favourite Irishmen, noting that despite offering him the American legation's best twelve-year-old Irish whiskey, Dillon would drink only tea, even, as Gray put it, "at 10 o'clock in the evening".

As the war turned against Germany, Fine Gael approached Dillon in 1944 and offered him the leadership of the party on condition that he abandon his views on neutrality; he refused, a decision his biographer Maurice Manning noted was ironic, since had Dillon accepted he might well have become Taoiseach in 1948.

== Return to office and Minister for Agriculture ==
=== First inter-party government, 1948–1951 ===
Dillon was one of the independent TDs who, following the 1948 general election, helped establish the first inter-party government under John A. Costello. During the campaign, as an independent candidate in Monaghan, Dillon drew on his opponents' past political associations, subjecting the Labour candidate George Pollock, a former communist organiser, to sustained criticism over his earlier career. Pollock polled only 582 first-preference votes.

Despite ideological differences, Dillon had no difficulty sharing cabinet with the Clann na Poblachta leader and former IRA chief of staff Seán MacBride; the two had attended Mount St Benedict's together. Alongside Patrick McGilligan at Finance and MacBride at External Affairs, Dillon was among those credited with steering the government towards a more interventionist, Keynesian economic policy, a departure from the retrenchment of previous administrations. As an independent TD, Dillon had already denounced the External Relations Act, the legislation governing the state's residual constitutional link with the Crown, as "a disgusting, fraudulent, dishonest attempt to blind our people", during a Dáil debate in June 1946, in which his future cabinet colleague McGilligan separately dismissed the Act as a "living lie".

Dillon was, by his own and others' accounts, overjoyed to receive the agriculture portfolio, which he regarded as the only serious engine of economic growth, notwithstanding the fact that, on the eve of the war, he had reportedly declared that he would never be seen dead in a field of wheat. His policy rested on increasing production at every level to sustain export earnings, and he emphasised assured prices, guaranteed markets, improved livestock quality, better veterinary services, mechanisation, and local leadership through committees of agriculture. He persuaded the government to channel substantial Marshall aid funds into agriculture, over the objections of a Department of Finance that viewed him as dangerously extravagant, much of it directed towards an ambitious land reclamation project, which he described on one occasion as a plan to "blast the rocks of Connemara into the sea". He was noted for his flamboyant use of modern advertising to reach farmers, including an advertisement aimed at the poultry industry subtitled, in Latin, Gallina senescens delenda est ("the ageing hen must be destroyed"), a device intended to prompt farmers to seek an explanation from their teacher or priest. In a celebrated exchange with the British minister for food, John Strachey, Dillon declared that, given sufficient incentive, Irish farmers could "drown England in eggs". Dillon later recalled that, in the fragmented state of agricultural representation before the establishment of a single national farmers' organisation, he had to consult as many as 63 separate bodies in order to ascertain the views of Irish farmers. Writing retrospectively, the columnist Con Houlihan recalled the period of the first inter-party government, and Dillon's stewardship of agriculture in particular, as among "the best years of modern Ireland", citing extensive land drainage, a renewed house-building programme, and a marked decline in tuberculosis.

When the Sunday Independent revealed in September 1948, while Costello was on an official visit to Canada, that the government intended to repeal the External Relations Act and declare a republic, Costello privately suspected that the story had originated from a cabinet leak, and at first blamed Dillon, given the latter's close personal friendship with the paper's editor, Hector Legge. Costello confirmed the government's intention at a press conference in Ottawa, later telling the Tánaiste, William Norton, that it was "really the article in the Sunday Independent that decided me". In 1999 Louie O'Brien, a former secretary to MacBride, stated that MacBride, rather than Dillon, had in fact been the source of the leak.

The first inter-party government fell in 1951 after the withdrawal of support by independent deputies on whom it depended. Although its collapse is most often attributed to the political fallout from the Mother and Child Scheme controversy involving the Minister for Health, Noël Browne, Manning's biography suggests the more immediate cause lay in a dispute over milk prices, and in Dillon's own refusal to deal directly with the Irish Creamery Milk Suppliers' Association.

=== Second inter-party government, 1954–1957 ===
Dillon returned to opposition as an independent in 1951, rejoined Fine Gael in May 1952, and became Minister for Agriculture for a second time when the second inter-party government was formed in 1954. His principal initiative in this period was the "parish plan", launched in 1955, and he contributed to the wider economic recovery plan then being developed by his cabinet colleague Tom O'Higgins, which anticipated many elements of the later First Programme for Economic Expansion. The plan lapsed, however, with the collapse of the government in 1957.

== Leader of Fine Gael, 1959–1965 ==
Dillon became leader of Fine Gael in October 1959, succeeding Richard Mulcahy as party leader and Costello as Leader of the Opposition; the change of leadership attracted little attention in a Dáil more preoccupied at the time with the future of the Abbey Theatre. His accession ended an unusual arrangement whereby Mulcahy had held the formal party leadership while Costello led the parliamentary party and had twice served as Taoiseach, a division Fanning later described as Fine Gael's "hybrid system of party leadership". An American diplomat, writing at the time of Dillon's election, remarked that he was "cast in an Edwardian mould". He became president of the party in 1960, and was the first Fine Gael leader to come from outside the revolutionary Sinn Féin tradition, a fact that some colleagues viewed with unease.

The party Dillon inherited was demoralised by heavy losses in 1957 and lacked full-time politicians, adequate organisation, or research facilities. He was also hampered by the Labour Party's decision, taken in 1960, to rule out entering coalition government, a policy his biographer Maurice Manning suggested was probably the single greatest obstacle to Dillon ever becoming Taoiseach. At the 1961 Irish general election, Dillon presented a moderately updated programme; Fine Gael's vote rose by some 50,000 and the party gained seven seats, but Lemass nonetheless formed a minority government with independent support.

Manning characterised Dillon's approach to opposition as being "not so much concerned with the content of policy as with its vigorous expression, along with the relentless harrying of the government in the Dáil", an outlook he traced to a Victorian parliamentary tradition holding that the duty of an opposition was simply to oppose. The contrast with Lemass's pragmatic drive was especially marked over the prospect of Irish membership of the European Economic Community: where the Taoiseach pursued the issue with the zeal of a convert, Dillon remained notably more apprehensive than enthusiastic.

=== The "Just Society" dispute ===
The years 1961 to 1965 were marked by an internal struggle for the future direction of Fine Gael, fought largely between conservatives led by Gerard Sweetman, described by one commentator as a "red-meat conservative", and modernisers grouped around Declan Costello, Tom O'Higgins and, from the sidelines, Garret FitzGerald, who sought a more social-democratic policy of state involvement in the economy. Dillon, an admirer of individual liberty, the rule of law and parliamentary supremacy, was suspicious of the ideology behind these proposals; Costello himself later admitted that, in another political context, he would have been a "Gaitskellite socialist", a label with which Dillon had little natural sympathy.

In April 1964, frustrated at the lack of progress on the front bench, Costello bypassed his colleagues and circulated a nine-point economic plan directly to the parliamentary party, a breach of protocol that provoked a series of fractious meetings over the following weeks. Two by-election defeats, in Cork and Kildare, later that year persuaded the party leadership that a change of course was needed, and the resulting document, Towards a Just Society, was adopted as Fine Gael policy in the run-up to the 1965 general election.

The internal debate exposed a sharp ideological divide within the party. On the right, Senator Edward McGuire, owner of the Dublin department store Brown Thomas, denounced Costello's proposals as "pure socialism of the most dictatorial kind", while Dillon himself told the parliamentary party: "I feel no sympathy with [Costello's] exhortation to move openly and firmly to the Left ... I believe we should be ready to do anything, consonant with the law of God, to surmount the problems that confront this country, but I believe that neither requires us to move to the right nor to the left, but straight ahead." In a wry letter to Costello in 1960, Dillon had already predicted that "Fine Gael will be the largest party in Dáil Éireann... I admit that this is an alarming prospect, but it is one that I do not suppose we can avoid facing if it arises". At one fractious meeting of the parliamentary party, the backbencher Maurice E. Dockrell summed up the party's confusion by suggesting that "the main thing was that we were decent fellows and our opponents weren't".

Dillon accepted the verdict as leader but remained, in the judgement of one historian, "an unconvincing and unconvinced advocate" of the new approach. At the launch of the party's manifesto, he undercut the thrust of the document by declaring that Fine Gael was and would remain a private enterprise party, stating: "We shall rely on private enterprise." He insisted that the cost of the new measures could be met from an expanding economy rather than from increased taxation.

=== The 1965 general election and resignation ===
Dillon launched Fine Gael's manifesto, which he described to political correspondents as the party's "blueprint for modern Ireland", at Leinster House in March 1965, telling the assembled journalists that the document was "not an election gimmick" but the product of twelve months' work. Asked where the party hoped to find sufficient economists and technologists to implement its plans, Dillon suggested, with a smile, that Ireland might follow Britain's example and employ Hungarians.

Fine Gael increased its share of the vote by a further two per cent but gained no additional seats at the 1965 election, and Lemass again formed a government without an overall majority. Shortly afterwards, and under no pressure to do so, Dillon resigned as leader of Fine Gael, sensing, as one columnist later put it, the "quicksands" of the Just Society moving against his more traditional views within the party; he was succeeded by Liam Cosgrave.

== Later career and retirement ==
Dillon continued as an active backbench TD after his resignation as leader, a period he was said to have enjoyed to the full, since, in Manning's words, "he adored parliament". In the late 1960s he took a particular interest in identifying what he regarded as communist influence at Trinity College Dublin, denouncing the college in the Dáil as a hotbed of communism following minor student protests during a state visit by the King and Queen of the Belgians. Dillon was personally close to Hector Legge, the Fine Gael-leaning editor of the Sunday Independent, whose paper gave prominent front-page coverage to the affair. The episode drew a rebuke from the Labour candidate and journalist Jim Downey, who told a party meeting that Dillon, together with Cosgrave, the Bishop of Galway and the editor of the Sunday Independent, were "simply not living in the same year AD as the rest of us".

Dillon retired from the Dáil at the 1969 general election, after thirty-seven continuous years as a member. In retirement, he became national president of the Ancient Order of Hibernians, undertook some book reviewing, and represented the diocese of Achonry on the National Council for the Apostolate of the Laity, where he became increasingly critical of what he saw as the tendency of Vatican theologians to usurp the authority of bishops. Speaking at the 60th anniversary of the founding of Cumann na nGaedheal in 1983, he reflected on more than sixty years in public life, described politics as a vocation, recalled the Blueshirts' struggle to preserve free speech, and told his audience that he was glad to serve "as a veteran in the field under a great and good man, Dr Garret FitzGerald".

== Political views ==
=== Liberalism ===
At the core of Dillon's outlook lay a Classical Liberal temperament, inherited in large part from his father and grandfather's place within the constitutional, Gladstonian wing of Irish nationalism. He was repeatedly characterised, by contemporaries and historians alike, as "an old-style nineteenth-century liberal", wedded to individual liberty, the rule of law, free trade and parliamentary supremacy, and instinctively wary of any marked expansion of the state's role in economic or social life. This was, in his own telling, the fulfilment rather than the repudiation of his inheritance: Dillon regarded his career as a continuation of "the work my father began", and his biographer Maurice Manning noted that his political appetite was shaped less by any vision of the future than by loyalty to the Redmondite past of the Irish Parliamentary Party, of which his father had been the last leader and his grandfather, John Blake Dillon, an early progenitor. At UCD, where he defended the Irish Parliamentary Party against the rising tide of Sinn Féin, Dillon was already being remembered as one of "the last frontiersmen" of that tradition, a label that might equally have served for his later stand against the collectivist instincts of Fine Gael's "Just Society" modernisers, whom he resisted on the grounds that the state ought to move "neither to the right nor to the left, but straight ahead".

=== Interventionism, Anti-fascism and foreign affairs ===
Dillon was, throughout his career, a strong advocate of Irish membership of the British Commonwealth, which he regarded both as a possible framework for eventual Irish unity and as an English-speaking forum through which the state could exert international influence. His opposition to neutrality during the Second World War, discussed above, was rooted in this outlook and in a deep and early antipathy to Nazism. On partition, Dillon consistently opposed both the loyalist status quo and any "armed solution", arguing that the state had to win "not only the barren acres of Ulster, but the hearts of the people who live in it".

=== Anti-communism ===
Dillon was a committed and outspoken anti-communist across his career. During the Spanish Civil War he argued in the Dáil that Fine Gael's support for recognising the Franco government turned on the "fundamental issue" of "God or no God". In January 1934, he publicly attacked the Fianna Fáil government's cordial relations with the British Independent Labour Party MPs James Maxton and John McGovern, telling an audience in Athlone that "if the policy of Fianna Fáil commended itself to James Maxton every Catholic workingman in the country ought to leave Fianna Fáil".

After the war, as an independent TD, Dillon repeatedly pressed de Valera in the Dáil to warn Irish emigrant workers against involvement with the London-based Connolly Association, which he characterised as a communist-influenced organisation; de Valera declined to do so, replying that he was not satisfied that the group's interest in Irish unity was purely communist in character. During the 1948 general election, Dillon drew heavily on the past communist associations of his Labour opponent, George Pollock. In the late 1960s, his repeated claims that Trinity College Dublin harboured communist sympathies attracted public criticism from within the Labour Party.

=== Economic and social policy ===
On economic and social questions, Dillon was, in the assessment of one contemporary commentator, "an old-style 19th-century liberal", committed to individual liberty, the rule of law, private enterprise and parliamentary supremacy, and instinctively suspicious of proposals for an expanded role for the state in economic planning. This outlook placed him at odds with the modernising wing of his own party during the "Just Society" debate of the 1960s, notwithstanding his own record as an interventionist Minister for Agriculture, in which capacity he had overseen substantial state investment in land reclamation and agricultural supports. He also opposed the policy of compulsory Irish favoured by many in his own party and in Fianna Fáil, warning that it would "come to stink in the nostrils of our people", notwithstanding his own fluency in the language.

== Personal life ==
In 1942, while on holiday in Carna, County Galway, Dillon met Maura Phelan, a draper's daughter from Clonmel, on a Friday. The couple were engaged within days and married six weeks later, when Dillon was forty and Maura was twenty-two. By his own reckoning Dillon had hoped to marry before turning forty, and missed the target by four days. The marriage was, according to Manning, "a long and happy" one; the couple had one son, John Blake Dillon, born in 1945. John Blake Dillon largely avoided direct political involvement, instead becoming an accountant and, for many years, a partner in the Dublin firm that became PwC; he died in 2021.

Dillon was noted for his formal, courteous manner and distinctive personal style, invariably appearing in public impeccably groomed, wearing a broad-brimmed black hat and smoking through an elegant cigarette holder. He was a devout, if independent-minded, Catholic, austere in his personal habits, and widely read in history, politics, philosophy and medicine, a subject he had wished to study in his youth. He was an avid cinema-goer, and counted the writers Frank O'Connor and Seán Ó Faoláin, and the tenor Count John McCormack, among his close friends.

== Death and funeral ==
Dillon died at his home in Ballaghaderreen, County Roscommon, on 10 February 1986, at the age of 83. He was survived by his wife, Maura, and his son, John.

His funeral took place at St Nathy's Cathedral, Ballaghaderreen, and was attended by the Taoiseach, Garret FitzGerald, and by Peter Barry, with President Patrick Hillery represented at the ceremony. Dillon was buried at St Coleman's Cemetery, Ballaghaderreen.

== Legacy ==
Dillon was widely regarded, in his own time and since, as one of the outstanding parliamentary orators in the history of Dáil Éireann. His former party colleague and later Fine Gael leader Liam Cosgrave recalled him as "very easy to work with", almost always good-humoured, "somewhat flamboyant", and suggested that had he gone on the stage, Dillon "would have rivalled Mac Liammóir as an actor". Writing some years after Dillon's death, the journalist Con Houlihan recalled him as the last major Irish politician of real imagination, suggesting that his outspokenness, although it proved correct on the question of neutrality, had cost him the chance of becoming Taoiseach. His long-time political rival Frank Aiken nonetheless pointedly noted Dillon's lack of a revolutionary record, asking on one occasion where Dillon had been "when this country required soldiers".

Dillon's friend and political opponent Todd Andrews provided what is often cited as his epitaph, describing Dillon as "a great and specially decent patriot".

Dillon's life and career were the subject of a major biography, James Dillon: A Biography (1999), by the Fine Gael senator and UCD academic Maurice Manning, based on six years of research and access to Dillon's private papers, which are held at Trinity College Dublin. Reviewing the book, the historian Donal McCartney praised it as "an impressive piece of work", noting that although Manning, as a Fine Gael member, was sympathetic to his subject, he did not shy away from discussing Dillon's shortcomings. Reviewing the same book for the Irish Independent, Ronan Fanning, Professor of Modern History at UCD, described Dillon as "the most exotic leader of Fine Gael" and likened the party's internal divisions during his leadership to a cricket match between amateur "Gentlemen" and professional "Players", with Fine Gael cast, under the "gentleman politician" Dillon, as the perennially unsuccessful amateurs. Writing separately, Tony O'Reilly described the biography as "a fine summary of a fine life of a fine man who made a great contribution to our country". The book was launched separately by two former Taoisigh, John Bruton in Dublin and Liam Cosgrave in Ballaghaderreen.

== Election results ==
Elections to the Dáil
Party	Election		FPv	FPv%	Result
Independent	Donegal	1932	7,645	11.8	Elected on count 1/12
National Centre Party	Donegal	1933	5,319	7.6	Elected on count 6/8
Fine Gael	Monaghan	1937	7,653	24.4	Elected on count 3/4
Fine Gael	Monaghan	1938	9,318	29.3	Elected on count 1/2
Independent	Monaghan	1943	5,406	18.3	Elected on count 4/4
Independent	Monaghan	1944	8,416	31.9	Elected on count 1/1
Independent	Monaghan	1948	6,621	23.1	Elected on count 4/7
Independent	Monaghan	1951	9,285	33.1	Elected on count 1/2
Fine Gael	Monaghan	1954	6,709	24.2	Elected on count 2/5
Fine Gael	Monaghan	1957	5,894	23.3	Elected on count 4/6
Fine Gael	Monaghan	1961	7,887	30.8	Elected on count 1/4
Fine Gael	Monaghan	1965	7,668	30.5	Elected on count 1/4

== Notes ==
Political offices
Preceded by Paddy Smith	Minister for Agriculture; 1948–1951	Succeeded by Thomas Walsh
Preceded by Thomas Walsh	Minister for Agriculture; 1954–1957	Succeeded by Frank Aiken
Party political offices
Preceded by Richard Mulcahy	Leader of Fine Gael; 1959–1965	Succeeded by Liam Cosgrave
Preceded by John A. Costello	Leader of the Opposition; 1959–1965	Succeeded by Liam Cosgrave

Dáil	Election	Deputy (Party)	Deputy (Party)	Deputy (Party)	Deputy (Party)	Deputy (Party)	Deputy (Party)	Deputy (Party)	Deputy (Party)
2nd	1921	Joseph O'Doherty (SF)	Samuel O'Flaherty (SF)	Patrick McGoldrick (SF)	Joseph McGinley (SF)	Joseph Sweeney (SF)	Peter Ward (SF)	6 seats 1921–1923	
3rd	1922	Joseph O'Doherty (AT-SF)	Samuel O'Flaherty (AT-SF)	Patrick McGoldrick (PT-SF)	Joseph McGinley (PT-SF)	Joseph Sweeney (PT-SF)	Peter Ward (PT-SF)	6 seats 1921–1923	
4th	1923	Joseph O'Doherty (Rep)	Peadar O'Donnell (Rep)	Patrick McGoldrick (CnaG)	Eugene Doherty (CnaG)	Patrick McFadden (CnaG)	Peter Ward (CnaG)	James Myles (Ind.)	John White (FP)
4th	1924 by-election	Joseph O'Doherty (Rep)	Peadar O'Donnell (Rep)	Patrick McGoldrick (CnaG)	Eugene Doherty (CnaG)	Patrick McFadden (CnaG)	Denis McCullough (CnaG)	James Myles (Ind.)	John White (FP)
5th	1927 (Jun)	Frank Carney (FF)	Neal Blaney (FF)	Daniel McMenamin (NL)	Eugene Doherty (CnaG)	Michael Óg McFadden (CnaG)	Hugh Law (CnaG)	James Myles (Ind.)	John White (FP)
6th	1927 (Sep)	Frank Carney (FF)	Neal Blaney (FF)	Archie Cassidy (Lab)	Eugene Doherty (CnaG)	Michael Óg McFadden (CnaG)	Hugh Law (CnaG)	James Myles (Ind.)	John White (FP)
7th	1932	Frank Carney (FF)	Neal Blaney (FF)	Brian Brady (FF)	Eugene Doherty (CnaG)	Daniel McMenamin (CnaG)	James Dillon (Ind.)	James Myles (Ind.)	John White (CnaG)
8th	1933	Joseph O'Doherty (FF)	Neal Blaney (FF)	Brian Brady (FF)	Hugh Doherty (FF)	Daniel McMenamin (CnaG)	James Dillon (NCP)	James Myles (Ind.)	Michael Óg McFadden (CnaG)
9th	1937	Constituency abolished. See Donegal East and Donegal West							

Dáil	Election	Deputy (Party)	Deputy (Party)	Deputy (Party)	Deputy (Party)	Deputy (Party)
21st	1977	Hugh Conaghan (FF)	Joseph Brennan (FF)	Neil Blaney (IFF)	James White (FG)	Paddy Harte (FG)
21st	1980 by-election	Hugh Conaghan (FF)	Clement Coughlan (FF)	Neil Blaney (IFF)	James White (FG)	Paddy Harte (FG)
22nd	1981	Constituency abolished. See Donegal North-East and Donegal South-West				

Dáil	Election	Deputy (Party)	Deputy (Party)	Deputy (Party)	Deputy (Party)	Deputy (Party)
32nd	2016	Pearse Doherty (SF)	Pat "the Cope" Gallagher (FF)	Thomas Pringle (Ind.)	Charlie McConalogue (FF)	Joe McHugh (FG)
33rd	2020	Pearse Doherty (SF)	Pádraig Mac Lochlainn (SF)	Thomas Pringle (Ind.)	Charlie McConalogue (FF)	Joe McHugh (FG)
34th	2024	Pearse Doherty (SF)	Pádraig Mac Lochlainn (SF)	Charles Ward (100%R)	Charlie McConalogue (FF)	Pat "the Cope" Gallagher (FF)

Dáil	Election	Deputy (Party)	Deputy (Party)	Deputy (Party)
2nd	1921	Seán MacEntee (SF)	Eoin O'Duffy (SF)	Ernest Blythe (SF)
3rd	1922	Patrick MacCarvill (AT-SF)	Eoin O'Duffy (PT-SF)	Ernest Blythe (PT-SF)
4th	1923	Patrick MacCarvill (Rep)	Patrick Duffy (CnaG)	Ernest Blythe (CnaG)
5th	1927 (Jun)	Patrick MacCarvill (FF)	Alexander Haslett (Ind.)	Ernest Blythe (CnaG)
6th	1927 (Sep)	Conn Ward (FF)	Alexander Haslett (Ind.)	Ernest Blythe (CnaG)
7th	1932	Conn Ward (FF)	Eamon Rice (FF)	Ernest Blythe (CnaG)
8th	1933	Conn Ward (FF)	Eamon Rice (FF)	Alexander Haslett (Ind.)
9th	1937	Conn Ward (FF)	Eamon Rice (FF)	James Dillon (FG)
10th	1938	Conn Ward (FF)	Bridget Rice (FF)	James Dillon (FG)
11th	1943	Conn Ward (FF)	Bridget Rice (FF)	James Dillon (Ind.)
12th	1944	Conn Ward (FF)	Bridget Rice (FF)	James Dillon (Ind.)
13th	1948	Patrick Maguire (FF)	Bridget Rice (FF)	James Dillon (Ind.)
14th	1951	Patrick Maguire (FF)	Bridget Rice (FF)	James Dillon (Ind.)
15th	1954	Patrick Mooney (FF)	Edward Kelly (FF)	James Dillon (FG)
16th	1957	Patrick Mooney (FF)	Eighneachán Ó hAnnluain (SF)	James Dillon (FG)
17th	1961	Patrick Mooney (FF)	Erskine H. Childers (FF)	James Dillon (FG)
18th	1965	Patrick Mooney (FF)	Erskine H. Childers (FF)	James Dillon (FG)
19th	1969	Billy Fox (FG)	Erskine H. Childers (FF)	John Conlan (FG)
20th	1973	Jimmy Leonard (FF)	Erskine H. Childers (FF)	John Conlan (FG)
20th	1973 by-election	Jimmy Leonard (FF)	Brendan Toal (FG)	John Conlan (FG)
21st	1977	Constituency abolished. See Cavan–Monaghan		
