= Mayo East =

Mayo East or East Mayo may refer to one of two parliamentary constituencies in County Mayo, Ireland:

- Mayo East (Dáil constituency) (1969–1997)
- East Mayo (UK Parliament constituency) (1885–1922)

See also

- County Mayo
