= Katty Barry =

Irish restaurateur (1909–1982)

- Born: 1909; Dalton's Avenue, Cork, Ireland
- Died: 27 December 1982 (aged 72–73); Cork
- Resting place: St. Joseph's Cemetery, Cork

Katty Barry (1909 – 27 December 1982), also Kathy Barry, was an Irish restaurateur and a famous Cork character.

== Biography ==
Katty Barry was born in 1909 on Dalton's Avenue, off the Coal Quay, Cork. Her father was John Barry. Her mother had a shop on Dalton's Avenue, which became an eating house when Barry took over. The menu consisted of traditional Irish food, including crubeens, and drisheen, with a convivial and raucous atmosphere. It was said that Barry's was frequented by peers and paupers alike, and all were treated the same, with nightly songs and stories. Despite having no licence, and being repeatedly fined, Barry served alcohol, often late at night. She is said to have recognised some of her customers among the judges and barristers in the courts. Barry's establishment had no electricity, and instead was lit by candles in empty milk bottles, and had an earthen floor.

The Cork Examiner described Barry as the personification "of a people and a culture peculiar to a particularly colourful and indigenously Cork milieu", presiding over bohemian Cork life until the closure and ultimate demolition of her establishment by Cork corporation in the late 1960s. The demise of Barry's eating house was lamented by Jimmy Crowley in his song Ballad of Katty Barry. A new verse was added to the old ballad, The Boys of Fairhill, in honour of Barry: "Katty Barry sells crubeens fairly bursting at the seams", with her name being invoked in local chants and expletives.

Barry lived out the rest of her life at No. 6 Corporation Buildings, across the road from her former establishment. She would visit Dennehy's Bar three times a day, taking a small whiskey and a glass of stout. The Irish Times stated that she remained "elegant, observant, highly intelligent, with a devilish twinkle in her eye and the ability to cut people down to size". Barry died in Cork on 27 December 1982, and was buried in St Joseph's Cemetery. In 2019, there were calls to erect a statue in honour of Barry.
