= James Francis Hogan =

James Francis Hogan MP (29 December 1855 – 9 November 1924) was an Irish history professor at University College Cork, author and Member of Parliament for Mid Tipperary between 1893 and 1900.

== Biography ==
Born in County Tipperary in 1855, to Rody and Mary Hogan, he had one sister, Margaret. He emigrated to Melbourne in 1856 and lived in Geelong, attending St. Mary's Catholic School there before a year at St Patrick's College, Melbourne. He graduated and began to teach in 1872. He began writing in local newspapers on Catholic topics, before later editing the Victorian Review. Joining he Victorian Catholic Young Men's Society in 1884 he admired the legacy of Daniel O'Connell and campaigned to erect a memorial to him. He published works on the Irish colonisation of Australia, including The Gladstone Colony: An Unwritten Chapter of Australian History and The Irish In Australian in the late 1890s.

He then returned to England, and in 1893 was elected unopposed to the House of Commons as MP for Mid Tipperary. He served as secretary of the Colonial Party under Sir Charles Dilke.

He died from pneumonia and cancer in London on 9 November 1924. He remained unmarried at his death, and was survived by his sister.

== Works ==
- The Convict King
- The Gladstone Colony
- The Irish in Australia
- The Sister Dominions
- The Australian in London and America
- An Australian Christmas Collection
- The Lost Explorer

Parliament of the United Kingdom
Preceded by John McCarthy	Member of Parliament for Mid Tipperary; 1893 – 1900	Succeeded by Kendal Edmund O'Brien
