= Henry Harrison (Irish politician) =

Irish politician (1867-1954)

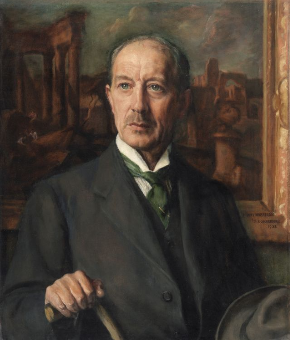

Member of Parliament for Mid Tipperary
- In office 1890–1892

Personal details
- Born: 17 December 1867
- Died: 20 February 1954 (aged 86)
- Party: Irish Parliamentary Party
- Education: Balliol College

Captain Henry Harrison OBE MC* MP (17 December 1867 – 20 February 1954) was an Irish politician. He served as MP in the House of Commons of the United Kingdom of Great Britain and Ireland and as member of the Irish Parliamentary Party represented Mid Tipperary from 1890 to 1892. He later served as a Royal Irish Regiment officer with the New British Army in World War I, was an extensive writer, and proponent of improved relations between the United Kingdom and Ireland.

== Biography ==
A Protestant nationalist, Harrison was the son of Henry Harrison of Holywood and Ardkeen, County Down and of Letitia Tennent. She was the daughter of Robert James Tennent, who had been Liberal MP for Belfast from 1847 to 1852 and a great-niece of the United Irishman Henry Joy McCracken hanged in 1798. Later, when widowed, Letitia married the author Hartley Withers. Henry's sister, Sarah Cecilia Harrison, was an artist and social reformer.

Harrison went to Westminster School and then to Balliol College, Oxford. While there he developed an admiration for Charles Stewart Parnell and became secretary of the Oxford University Home Rule Group. At this time, the Land War was in progress and in 1889 Harrison went to Ireland to visit the scene of the evictions in Gweedore, County Donegal. He became involved in physical confrontations with the Royal Irish Constabulary and as a result became a Nationalist celebrity overnight. The following May, Parnell offered the vacant parliamentary seat of Mid-Tipperary to Harrison, who left Oxford, still aged only 22, to take it up, unopposed.

Only six months later, following the divorce case involving Katharine O'Shea, the Irish Parliamentary Party split over Parnell's leadership. Harrison strongly supported Parnell, acted as his bodyguard and aide-de-camp, and after Parnell's death devoted himself to the service of his widow Katharine. From her he heard a completely different version of the events surrounding the divorce case from that which had appeared in the press, and this was to form the seed of his later books.

At the general election of 1892, Harrison did not defend Mid-Tipperary. He stood at West Limerick as a Parnellite instead, but came nowhere near winning the seat. In 1895 general election, he stood at North Sligo, polling better but again far short of winning. In 1895 Harrison married Maie Byrne, an American, with whom he had a son. He came to prominence briefly again in 1903 when, in spite of his lack of legal training, he successfully conducted his own case in a court action all the way to the House of Lords.

Otherwise, however, he disappeared from public view until his war service with the Royal Irish Regiment when he served on the Western Front with distinction in the New British Army formed for the First World War, reaching the rank of Captain and being awarded the MC. He organised patrols in "No Man's Land" so successfully that he was appointed special patrol officer to the 16th (Irish) Division. He was invalided out and became a recruiting officer in Ireland. He was appointed an Officer of the Order of the British Empire in the 1919 New Year Honours.

He then made a return to Irish politics, working with Sir Horace Plunkett as Secretary of the Irish Dominion League, an organisation campaigning for dominion status for Ireland within the British Empire. Harrison was a lifelong opponent of Irish partition. He was Irish correspondent of The Economist from 1922 to 1927 and owner-editor of Irish Truth from 1924 to 1927.

Harrison's two books defending Parnell were published in 1931 and 1938. They have had a major impact on Irish historiography, leading to a more favourable view of Parnell's role in the O’Shea affair. F. S. L. Lyons commented that he "did more than anyone else to uncover what seems to have been the true facts" about the Parnell-O'Shea liaison. The second book, Parnell, Joseph Chamberlain and Mr Garvin, was written in response to J. L. Garvin's biography of Joseph Chamberlain, which had ignored Harrison's first book, Parnell Vindicated: The Lifting of the Veil. Later, Harrison successfully repulsed an attempt in the official history of The Times to rehabilitate that newspaper's role in using forged letters to attack Parnell in the later 1880s. In 1952 he forced The Times to publish a four-page correction written by him as an appendix to the fourth volume of the history.

During the difficult years of the Anglo-Irish Trade War over the land purchase annuities, declaration of the Republic, Irish neutrality during World War II, and departure from the Commonwealth, Harrison worked to promote good relations between Britain and Ireland. He published various books and pamphlets on the issues in dispute and wrote numerous letters to The Times. He also founded, with General Sir Hubert Gough, the Commonwealth Irish Association in 1942. By the time of his death, he was the last survivor of the Irish Parliamentary Party led by Parnell, and as a member of the pre-1918 Irish Parliamentary Party, he seems to have been outlived only by John Patrick Hayden, who died a few months after him in 1954 and by Patrick Whitty and John Lymbrick Esmonde who were only MPs for a very short time during the First World War. He is buried in Holywood, County Down.

== Selected publications ==
- Parnell Vindicated: the lifting of the veil, London, Constable, 1931
- The Strange Case of the Irish Land Purchase Annuities, Dublin, M. H. Gill, 1932
- Ireland and the British Empire, 1937: Conflict or Collaboration?: A study of Anglo-Irish differences from an international standpoint, London, Robert Hale & Co., 1937
- Parnell, Joseph Chamberlain and Mr Garvin, London, Robert Hale, 1938
- Ulster and the British Empire 1939, London, Robert Hale, 1939
- The Partition of Ireland: How Britain is responsible, London, Robert Hale, 1939
- The Neutrality of Ireland: Why it was inevitable, London, Robert Hale Ltd, 1942
- Parnell, Joseph Chamberlain and "The Times": A Documentary Record: tempora mutantur, Belfast, Irish News; Dublin, Brown & Nolan, 1953

Parliament of the United Kingdom
Preceded by Thomas Mayne	Member of Parliament for Mid Tipperary; 1890 – 1892	Succeeded by John McCarthy
