= Kendal Edmund O'Brien =

Irish politician

Kendal Edmund O'Brien (1849 – 21 November 1909) was an Irish nationalist politician and Member of Parliament (MP) in the House of Commons of the United Kingdom of Great Britain and Ireland.

He represented the Irish Parliamentary Party the for Mid Tipperary constituency, from 1900 until his death in office in November 1909.

Parliament of the United Kingdom
Preceded by James Francis Hogan	Member of Parliament for Mid Tipperary; 1900 – 1909	Succeeded by John Hackett
