= Marie-Louise Sjoestedt =

Marie-Louise Sjoestedt-Jonval (20 September 1900 – 26 December 1940) was a French linguist and literary scholar who specialized in Celtic studies, especially Irish mythology. Together with Joseph Loth, she was co-editor of Revue Celtique and director at the École pratique des hautes études in Paris, France.

Her best-known work is Dieux et héros des Celtes (1940), which appeared in a posthumous English translation by Myles Dillon as Gods and Heroes of the Celts (1949). It deals with the gods and heroes of the continental Celts and Irish mythology.

== Publications ==
- 1926. L'aspect verbal et les formations à affixe nasale en celtique. Paris: Librairie Honoré Champion.
- 1931. Phonétique d'un parler irlandais de Kerry. Paris: Ernest Leroux.
- 1936. "Légendes épiques Irlandaises et monnaies gauloises: recherches sur la constitution de la legende de Cuchullainn." Études Celtiques 1. pp. 1–77. ISSN 0373-1928. RHS record
- 1938. Description d'un parler irlandais de Kerry. Bibliothèque de l'École des Hautes Études 270. Paris: Librairie Honoré Champion. 222 p.
- 1938. "Études sur le temps et l'aspect en vieil irlandais." Études Celtiques 3. pp. 105–130 and 219-273.
- 1940. Dieux et Héros des Celtes. Paris: Leroux. (Chapters: Mythes et religions : période mythique - divinités (celtes continentaux - déesses-mères d'Irlande - Dieux-chefs de l'Irlande) - Hommes et Dieux et Héros, Samain-Samonios : Fête du premier Novembre)
- 1949. Gods and Heroes of the Celts, London, Methuen. English translation by Myles Dillon.
