= 1893 Mid Tipperary by-election =

UK Parliamentary by-election

The 1893 Mid Tipperary by-election was a parliamentary by-election held for the United Kingdom House of Commons constituency of Mid Tipperary on 24 February 1893. The vacancy arose because of the death of the sitting member, John McCarthy of the Irish National Federation. Only one candidate was nominated, James Francis Hogan of the Irish National Federation, who was elected unopposed.

== Result ==
Mid Tipperary by-election, 1893
Party	Candidate	Votes	%	±%
Irish National Federation	James Francis Hogan	Unopposed	N/A	N/A
Irish National Federation hold				
