= John Hackett (Irish politician) =

John Hackett (1865–1940) was an Irish politician.

He was an MP, representing the Irish Parliamentary Party, for Mid Tipperary, from January 1910 until December 1918.

Parliament of the United Kingdom
Preceded by Kendal Edmund O'Brien	Member of Parliament for Mid Tipperary; 1910 – 1918	Succeeded by Séamus Burke
