= Myles Dillon =

Irish scholar (1900–1972)

- Born: Myles Patrick Dillon; 11 April 1900; Dublin, Ireland
- Died: 18 June 1972 (aged 72); Monkstown, Dublin, Ireland
- Burial place: Glasnevin Cemetery
- Spouse: Elizabeth Mary La Touche (m. 1938)
- Children: 5, including John M. Dillon
- Parents: John Dillon (father); Elizabeth Mathew (mother)
- Relatives: James Dillon (brother); John Blake Dillon (paternal grandfather); James Charles Mathew (maternal grandfather); John David Digues La Touche (father-in-law)

Academic background
- Education: University College Dublin; (B.A., 1921; M.A., 1922); University of Bonn; (Ph.D., 1925)
- Doctoral advisor: Rudolf Thurneysen

Academic work
- Institutions: Trinity College Dublin; (1928–1930); University College Dublin; (1930–1937); University of Wisconsin; (1937–1946); University of Chicago; (1946–1947); University of Edinburgh; (1947–1949); Dublin Institute for Advanced Studies; (1949–1968)
- Main interests: Comparative philology; Celtic studies; Sanskrit

Myles Patrick Dillon (11 April 1900 – 18 June 1972) was an Irish scholar whose primary interests were comparative philology, Celtic studies, and Sanskrit.

== Early life ==
Myles Dillon was born in Dublin on 11 April 1900, one of six children of John and Elizabeth Dillon. James Dillon, the leader of Fine Gael, was his younger brother.

== Academic career ==
Myles Dillon graduated from University College Dublin, and then travelled to Germany and France, where he studied in deep Old Irish and Celtic philology under Joseph Vendryes and Rudolf Thurneysen. Dillon taught Sanskrit and comparative philology in Trinity College Dublin (1928–1930) and University College, Dublin (1930–1937). In 1937 he moved to the US, where he taught Irish in the University of Wisconsin (his son John M. Dillon was born in Madison), in 1946–1947 taught in Chicago. On his return to Ireland, he worked in the School of Celtic Studies in Dublin Institute for Advanced Studies; was the director of the School from 1960 till 1968, edited Celtica. Volume 11 of Celtica is dedicated to his memory. From 1966 to 1967 he was President of the Royal Irish Academy.

Myles Dillon was the author of a number of important scholarly books, handbooks and translations from Old Irish. Among his most notable works are The Cycles of the Kings (1946), Early Irish Literature (1948), The Celtic Realms (1967, with Nora Kershaw Chadwick). M. Dillon published a modern translation and commentary of The Book of Rights (Old Irish: Lebor na cert, 1962). He also translated Dieux et héros des Celtes by Marie-Louise Sjoestedt into English, thus making the book available for a wider scholarly audience. The monograph Celts and Aryans, published posthumously by the Indian Institute of Advanced Study reflects Dillon's interest in the traces of the shared heritage in the Indian and Irish cultures deriving from Proto-Indo-European society based on a period of research Dillon spent in Simla, India.

== Personal life and death ==
On 24 August 1938, Dillon married Elizabeth Mary La Touche, the youngest daughter of John David Digues La Touche. They had two daughters and three sons, including John Myles Dillon.

Dillon died in Monkstown, Dublin, on 18 June 1972, at the age of 72. He was buried at Glasnevin Cemetery.

== Publications ==
- Dillon, Myles (1946). The Cycles of the Kings. London: Oxford University Press.
- Dillon, Myles (1948). Early Irish Literature. Chicago: University of Chicago Press.
- Dillon, Myles, ed. (1954). Early Irish Society. Dublin: Cultural Relations Committee of Ireland.
- Dillon, Myles, ed. (1959). Irish Sagas. Dublin: Thomas Davis Lectures.
- Dillon, Myles; Ó Cróinín, Donncha (1961). Teach Yourself Irish. London: English Universities Press.
- Dillon, Myles, ed. (1962). Lebor na Cert: The Book of Rights. Dublin: Irish Texts Society.
- Dillon, Myles; Chadwick, Nora K. (1967). The Celtic Realms. London: Weidenfeld and Nicolson.
- Dillon, Myles (1975). Celts and Aryans: Survivals of Indo-European Speech and Society. Simla: Indian Institute of Advanced Study.
- Fisher, Joachim; Dillon, John, eds. (1999). The Correspondence of Myles Dillon, 1922-1925: Irish–German Relations and Celtic Studies. Dublin: Four Courts Press.
