= John McCarthy (Irish politician) =

John McCarthy (1862 – 8 February 1893) was an Irish nationalist politician and member of parliament (MP) in the House of Commons of the United Kingdom of Great Britain and Ireland.

He was elected as an Irish National Federation (Anti-Parnellite) MP for the Mid Tipperary constituency at the 1892 general election. He died in office in 1893 and the by-election for his seat was won by James Francis Hogan.

Parliament of the United Kingdom
Preceded by Henry Harrison	Member of Parliament for Mid Tipperary; 1892 – 1893	Succeeded by James Francis Hogan
