= Joseph Walton (judge) =

English lawyer and judge

Sir Joseph Walton
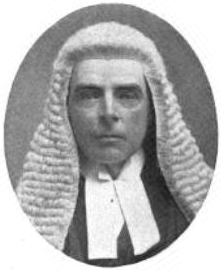
- In The Sketch, 30 October 1901

Justice of the High Court
- In office 1901 – 12 August 1910

Personal details
- Born: 25 September 1845; Liverpool, England
- Died: 12 August 1910 (aged 64); Shingle Street, England
- Spouse: Teresa D'Arcy (m. 1871)
- Children: 9
- Education: Stonyhurst College; University of London

Sir Joseph Walton (25 September 1845 – 12 August 1910) was an English lawyer and judge. He was a Justice of the High Court from 1901 until his sudden death in 1910.

Born in a Catholic family in Liverpool, Walton's progress at the bar was slow. He acquired a reputation in commercial work, first in Liverpool's local courts, then in the Commercial Court in London, which he dominated from its creation in 1895. As a judge, however, he disappointed many by not fulfilling expectations, owing to his over-conscientiousness and diffidence about his abilities. Nevertheless, he was very popular among the legal profession, who held him in high esteem.

== Early life and career ==
Joseph Walton was born in Liverpool in a Roman Catholic family, the eldest son of Joseph Walton of Fazakerley, Lancashire, by his wife Winifred Cowley. After being educated at St. Francis Xavier's College, Salisbury Street, and the Jesuit Stonyhurst College, he passed to London University, and graduated in 1865 with first-class honours in mental and moral science. In the same year he entered Lincoln's Inn, where he was called to the bar on 17 November 1868, and was made a bencher in 1896.

Walton, who joined the Northern Circuit, entered the chambers of his fellow Catholic Charles Russell (later Lord Russell of Killowen), then one of the leading juniors, and practised for several years as a 'local' at Liverpool. His chief work was in commercial and shipping cases, but his name is also associated with other important actions. A Roman Catholic as well as a distinguished advocate, Walton was retained in the actions brought successfully in the interest of Catholic children against Thomas John Barnardo. Walton took a leading part in two cases which attracted considerable public interest. Having succeeded Sir Charles Russell as leading counsel to the Jockey Club, he appeared in Powell v. Kempton Park Racecourse Company [1899] AC 143, which defined a "place" within the meaning of the Betting Act, 1853, and in the copyright case of Walter v. Lane [1900] AC 539, arising out of the republication of reports from The Times of speeches by Lord Rosebery which decided that there is copyright in the report of a speech.

== High Court judge ==
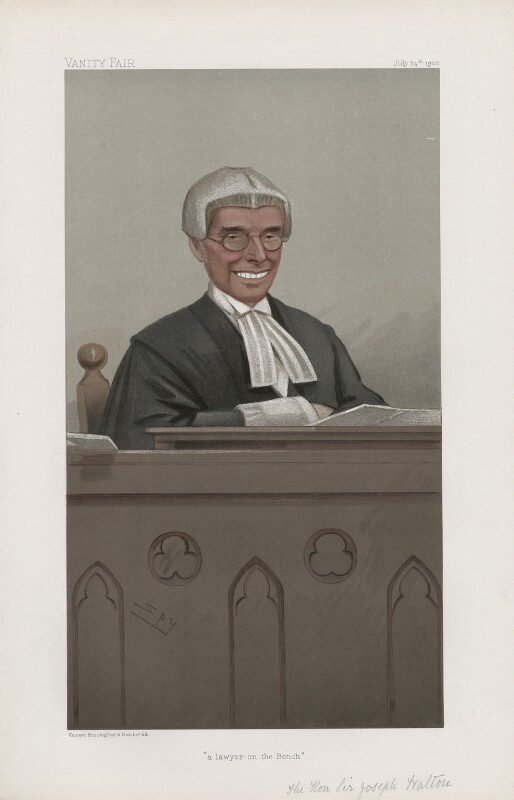
Caricature in Vanity Fair, 24 July 1902

Walton's advancement in the profession was slow. He took silk in 1892, and became Recorder of Wigan in 1895; but the general esteem in which he was held was shown by his election in 1899 to be chairman of the General Council of the Bar. At the same time, he became the dominant lawyer in the new Commercial Court, which had been established within the Queen's Bench Division in 1895. In the first volume of Commercial Court law reports, Walton recorded thirty-five appearances; his nearest rival and Liverpool contemporary, John Bigham, recorded only sixteen. In 1897, Bigham was promoted to the High Court bench, cementing Walton's dominance of the Commercial Court.

Upon the appointment in 1901 of Sir James Mathew to be a Lord Justice of Appeal, Walton succeeded him as a judge of the King's Bench Division of the High Court, and was knighted. Lord Salisbury, who objected to Mathew's conduct on the Evicted Tenants Commission of 1892, considered "making Walton Lord Justice at once over Mathew's head", but in acceded to Lord Halsbury's original proposal.

Walton's wide experience of commercial matters was of service to the Commercial Court, but on the whole his work as a judge did not fulfil expectation, though in judicial demeanour he was above criticism. He was interested in the work of the Medico-Legal Society, of which he became second president in 1905. He died suddenly at his country residence at Shingle Street, near Woodbridge, on 12 August 1910, having taken, in the previous week, an active part in the proceedings of the International Law Association in London. He was buried in the Roman Catholic cemetery, Kensal Green.

== Personal life ==
Walton took an active part in Catholic social and educational movements, and for a time was a member of the Liverpool school board. Much of his leisure was spent in yachting, and he was a frequent prize-winner at the Oxford and Aldeburgh regattas. He wrote a small work on the Practice and Procedure of the Court of Common Pleas at Lancaster (1870), and was one of the editors of the Annual Practice of the Supreme Court for 1884–85 and 1885–86.

He married on 12 September 1871 Teresa, fourth daughter of Nicholas D'Arcy of Ballyforan, co. Roscommon, by whom he had eight sons and one daughter. A younger son, Louis Alban, second lieutenant, royal Lancaster regiment, died of enteric fever at Naauwpoort on 19 May 1901, aged twenty.

== Assessment ==
In his obituary, The Times noted that:

Walton did not quite realize the high expectations which had been formed, and will hardly rank among the first men of his time among the occupants of the Bench. The cause of this result was in itself a merit, for it was his over-conscientiousness and a certain want of confidence in himself.

According to a modern assessment:

Walton never managed as a Judge to fulfil the expectations which he been generated by his career at the Bar. Probably he never could have done: to be as successful on the Bench as he had been at the Bar, Walton would have had to have been the best Commercial Judge of all time, better than Mathew, and Mathew was peerless. But even allowing for that, Walton's judicial performance was disappointing.

But:

the legal profession recognised his merits as well as his faults. He was patient, and he had a reputation for courtesy to which Mathew and Bigham could not always lay claim. His knowledge and understanding of the law were universally acknowledged, and he was not gripped by indecision in every case. When he did struggle, he received credit for being conscientious, even if litigants and lawyers sometimes wished that he could be conscientious more quickly. Joseph Walton was an exceptionally popular Judge.
