= Séamus Burke =

Irish politician (1893–1967)

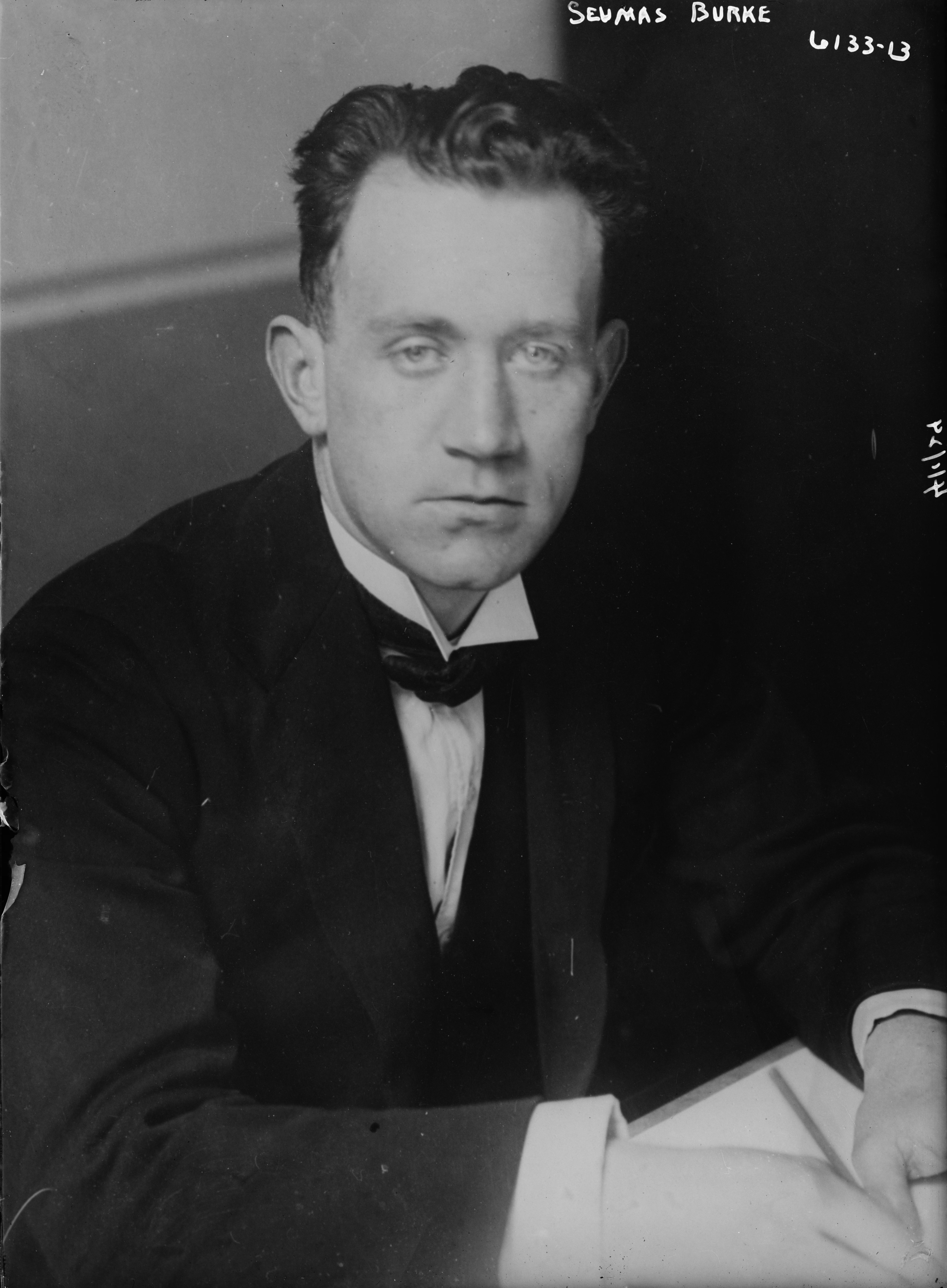
- Burke, c.1920s

Parliamentary Secretary
- 1927–1932: Finance

Minister for Local Government and Public Health
- In office 2 June 1924 – 23 June 1927
- President: W. T. Cosgrave
- Preceded by: New office
- Succeeded by: Richard Mulcahy

Teachta Dála
- In office August 1923 – June 1938
- Constituency: Tipperary
- In office May 1921 – August 1923
- Constituency: Tipperary Mid, North and South
- In office December 1918 – May 1921
- Constituency: Tipperary Mid

Personal details
- Born: James Aloysius Burke; 15 June 1893 Roscrea, County Tipperary, Ireland
- Died: 10 June 1967 (aged 73) Farnham, Surrey, England
- Party: Fine Gael; Cumann na nGaedheal
- Spouse: Zenaide Bashkiroff (m. 1929)
- Children: 1
- Education: Trinity College Dublin; King's Inns

Séamus Aloysius Burke (sometimes spelt Bourke) (15 June 1893 – 10 June 1967) was an Irish barrister and politician who served as Minister of State at the Department of Finance from 1927 to 1932 and Minister for Local Government and Public Health from 1924 to 1927. He was a Teachta Dála (TD) from 1918 to 1938.

== Early life ==
Burke was born on 15 June 1893 at Newgrove House, Rathnavogue near Roscrea, County Tipperary. He was the eldest son of Tobias Henry Burke, a farmer originally from Burlington, Borrisoleigh, and Bridget Agnes Quinlan, daughter of Patrick Quinlan of Cummer, Kilcommon. In 1905 the Burke family emigrated to the United States, settling in New York, where his father Tobias had inherited property. During his childhood, two of Burkers older brothers died of scarlatina. The Burkes returned to Ireland in 1908 and acquired Rockforest, also in County Tipperary.

Burke became an American citizen during his time in New York and was educated at Fordham University in New York, Clongowes Wood College, Trinity College Dublin (TCD), and entered the King's Inns in 1913.

== Career ==
Although Burke was called to the bar in 1916, he chose to focus on politics instead of pursuing a legal career. Burke joined the Irish Volunteers in Dublin and became a Sinn Féin organiser and Volunteer drill instructor in Tipperary. After being arrested for illegal drilling in 1918 and refusing to recognise the court, he was imprisoned in Belfast for four months. Later that year, he was elected unopposed to represent mid-Tipperary for Sinn Féin in the 1918 general election as a Sinn Féin TD for Tipperary Mid. Dubbed "the most hunted man in Ireland" by the Irish Independent, Burke was smuggled to the US in November 1918 as a stoker aboard the RMS Aquitania. In New York and Ohio Burke was the director of the loan campaign, for which he is said to have collected over a million dollars.

Upon returning to Ireland in 1919 during the War of Irish Independence, he worked for the Dáil Department of Local Government, drawing the ire of British Chief Secretary Ian MacPherson, who imposed martial law on Tipperary, partly attributing it to Burke's activities. Burke was reputedly involved in an attack on Borrisoleigh barracks during one of the last actions of the War of Independence. In c. early 1922 Burke was also the only Tipperary TD to support the Anglo-Irish Treaty in the Dáil.

Burke was elected at the top of the polls in the 1922 general election and 1923 general election and served as Minister for Local Government and Public Health from 15 October 1923 to 23 June 1927. During his tenure, the Local Government Act of 1925 reorganised local authorities, abolishing rural districts and replacing 19 local authorities with county commissioners. Burke initiated the abolition of workhouses and the national trunk road scheme. In March 1926, he dismissed Labour's demands to amend the Unemployment Insurance Acts as utopian.

In 1927, Burke was demoted to Parliamentary Secretary to the Minister for Finance, overseeing the Office of Public Works, to accommodate Richard Mulcahy's return to the cabinet. His notable achievement in this role was the National Monuments Act of 1930, which established legal protections for national monuments. In opposition, Burke supported the Blueshirts and European fascist movements for a time and criticised the 1937 Constitution of Ireland, arguing it would allow Fianna Fáil to undermine press freedom and individual rights. After losing his seat in the 1938 general election, Burke ran unsuccessfully as an independent in 1943.

== Personal life ==
In 1929 Burke married Zenaide Bashkiroff, the eldest daughter of Captain Alexis Bashkiroff, a gentleman of the chamber to Tsar Nicholas II, and Zenaide Soumarokoff-Elston, the daughter of Count Felix Sumarokov-Elston. Zenaide was a cousin of Prince Felix Yusupov, known for his role in the assassination of Rasputin. Growing up with an Irish governess, Zenaide moved to Ireland for her secondary education before attending an agricultural college in England. After the family relocated to England, she pursued a career in ceramic art and became a recognised artist in the field. The couple had one daughter.

Burke was connected to several notable figures, including John Daly Burk, Thomas Burke (the stepfather of W. T. Cosgrave), Seán Treacy, and Richard Burke, who served as Minister for Education (1973–1976) and as a European Commissioner. At the time of his death on 10 June 1967 in Farnham Hospital, Burke was residing in Camberley, Surrey. His published works include Foundations of Peace (1920), Thoughts on the Cause of the Present Discontent (1937), and Eire Tomorrow: A Sociological Survey (c.1943).

== Arms ==
Coat of arms of Séamus Burke
Notes Granted 8 May 1923 by Sir Nevile Rodwell Wilkinson, Ulster King of Arms. Crest On a wreath of the colours a cat-a-mountain sejant guardant Sable collared and chained Or. Escutcheon Or a cross Gules in the first quarter a dexter hand couped at the wrist Sable. Motto A Cruce Semper Salus ('From the Cross, Always Salvation')

== See also ==
- House of Burgh, an Anglo-Norman and Hiberno-Norman dynasty founded in 1193

Parliament of the United Kingdom
Preceded by John Hackett	Member of Parliament for Tipperary Mid; 1918–1922	Constituency abolished
Oireachtas
New constituency	Teachta Dála for Tipperary Mid; 1918–1921	Constituency abolished
Political offices
Preceded by Ernest Blythe	Minister for Local Government and Public Health; 1923–1927	Succeeded by Richard Mulcahy
Preceded by Eamonn Duggan	Parliamentary Secretary to the Minister for Finance; 1927–1932	Succeeded by Hugo Flinn

Dáil	Election	Deputy (Party)	Deputy (Party)	Deputy (Party)	Deputy (Party)
2nd	1921	Patrick O'Byrne (SF)	Séamus Burke (SF)	Joseph MacDonagh (SF)	P. J. Moloney (SF)
3rd	1922	Daniel Morrissey (Lab)	Séamus Burke (PT-SF)	Joseph MacDonagh (AT-SF)	P. J. Moloney (AT-SF)
4th	1923	Constituency abolished. See Tipperary			

Dáil	Election	Deputy (Party)	Deputy (Party)	Deputy (Party)	Deputy (Party)	Deputy (Party)	Deputy (Party)	Deputy (Party)
4th	1923	Dan Breen (Rep)	Séamus Burke (CnaG)	Louis Dalton (CnaG)	Daniel Morrissey (Lab)	Patrick Ryan (Rep)	Michael Heffernan (FP)	Seán McCurtin (CnaG)
5th	1927 (Jun)	Seán Hayes (FF)	Séamus Burke (CnaG)	John Hassett (CnaG)	Daniel Morrissey (Lab)	William O'Brien (Lab)	Michael Heffernan (FP)	Andrew Fogarty (FF)
6th	1927 (Sep)	Seán Hayes (FF)	Séamus Burke (CnaG)	John Hassett (CnaG)	Daniel Morrissey (Lab)	Timothy Sheehy (FF)	Michael Heffernan (FP)	Andrew Fogarty (FF)
7th	1932	Seán Hayes (FF)	Séamus Burke (CnaG)	John Hassett (CnaG)	Daniel Morrissey (Ind.)	Timothy Sheehy (FF)	Dan Breen (FF)	Andrew Fogarty (FF)
8th	1933	Seán Hayes (FF)	Séamus Burke (CnaG)	Richard Curran (NCP)	Daniel Morrissey (CnaG)	Martin Ryan (FF)	Dan Breen (FF)	Andrew Fogarty (FF)
9th	1937	William O'Brien (Lab)	Séamus Burke (FG)	Jeremiah Ryan (FG)	Daniel Morrissey (FG)	Martin Ryan (FF)	Dan Breen (FF)	Andrew Fogarty (FF)
10th	1938	Frank Loughman (FF)	Richard Curran (FG)	Jeremiah Ryan (FG)	Daniel Morrissey (FG)	Martin Ryan (FF)	Dan Breen (FF)	Andrew Fogarty (FF)
11th	1943	Richard Stapleton (Lab)	William O'Donnell (CnaT)	Jeremiah Ryan (FG)	Daniel Morrissey (FG)	Martin Ryan (FF)	Dan Breen (FF)	Andrew Fogarty (FF)
12th	1944	Frank Loughman (FF)	William O'Donnell (CnaT)	Richard Mulcahy (FG)	Daniel Morrissey (FG)	Mary Ryan (FF)	Dan Breen (FF)	Andrew Fogarty (FF)
12th	1947 by-election	Frank Loughman (FF)	Patrick Kinane (CnaP)	Richard Mulcahy (FG)	Daniel Morrissey (FG)	Mary Ryan (FF)	Dan Breen (FF)	Andrew Fogarty (FF)
13th	1948	Constituency abolished. See Tipperary North and Tipperary South						

Dáil	Election	Deputy (Party)	Deputy (Party)	Deputy (Party)	Deputy (Party)	Deputy (Party)
32nd	2016	Séamus Healy (WUA)	Alan Kelly (Lab)	Jackie Cahill (FF)	Michael Lowry (Ind.)	Mattie McGrath (Ind.)
33rd	2020	Martin Browne (SF)	Alan Kelly (Lab)	Jackie Cahill (FF)	Michael Lowry (Ind.)	Mattie McGrath (Ind.)
34th	2024	Constituency abolished. See Tipperary North and Tipperary South				
