= Anne Deane =

Irish businesswoman

- Born: c.1834 Ballaghaderreen, County Roscommon
- Died: 3 July 1905 (aged 70–71); Sisters of Charity nursing home, Leeson Street, Dublin

Anne Deane (c.1834 – 3 July 1905) was an Irish nationalist and businesswoman.

== Life ==
Anne Deane was born Anne Duff at Ballaghaderreen, County Roscommon around 1834. She was the daughter of Joseph Duff and Monica Duff (née Dillon). John Blake Dillon was her maternal uncle. After the death of her father, her mother owned and managed a store in Ballaghaderreen, Monica Duff & Co Ltd. She was educated with her brother by his tutor, where Deane excelled at mathematics. As a young woman, she spent time with her uncle in Dublin, meeting nationalists of the time. Her initial plans to marry a lawyer from Foxford, Edward Deane, were thwarted by her mother. After a period of time and an intervention of her uncle, they married in February 1864.

When her mother's business experienced problems, Deane returned to Ballaghadereen, remaining there after she was widowed as a young woman. She had a flair for managing the shop, and at the time she inherited it from her mother it was the most successful and largest business in the west of Ireland. When Andrew Kettle visited he noted that she was a "remarkable woman who seemed to be quite at home at the head of a business that looked like the centre not of a town like Ballaghaderreen, but a province." Deane remained in contact with those she knew in Foxford. When Agnes Bernard of the Sisters of Charity moved to Ballaghaderreen, Deane was a prominent benefactor, donating large sums as well as sometimes paying for meals to be delivered to them.

Deane had no children of her own, but she was involved in the raising of the young family of her uncle John Blake and his wife Adelaide following their deaths in 1866 and 1872 respectively. His son, John Dillon, divided his time between Dublin and Ballaghaderreen, and regarded Deane as his second mother. She gave Dillon a large fortune, potentially as much as £30,000, which allowed him to marry. Deane was a supporter of home rule, with her home serving as a meeting place for local nationalists. She was among the founders of the Ladies' Land League in January 1881. She was chosen as honorary president, but owing to her business taking up the majority of her time, Anna Catherine Parnell was viewed at the real leader of the group.

Deane suffered a fall in 1904, which led to her moving into the nursing home of the Sisters of Charity on Leeson Street, Dublin. She died there on 3 July 1905, and was buried at Strade Abbey, County Mayo. John Dillon had an inscription placed on her tombstone stating that he owed her everything.
