= Thomas Mayne (politician) =

Thomas Mayne (1832–1915) was an Irish Parliamentary Party politician. He was elected as Member of Parliament (MP) for County Tipperary at a by-election in 1883, and held the seat until the constituency was divided at the 1885 general election. He was then elected for the new Mid division of Tipperary, and held that seat until he resigned in 1890 by becoming Steward of the Manor of Northstead.

Parliament of the United Kingdom
Preceded by John Dillon; Patrick James Smyth	Member of Parliament for County Tipperary; 1883 – 1885; With: Patrick James Smyth to January 1885; John O'Connor from January 1885	Constituency abolished
New constituency	Member of Parliament for Mid Tipperary; 1885 – 1890	Succeeded by Henry Harrison
