= James Downey (journalist) =

Irish journalist and author

James Downey was an Irish journalist and author.

Born in Dromahair, County Leitrim, he began his newspaper career in the early 1950s when his father secured him a job with the Sligo Champion newspaper, mostly proof-reading the Donegal electoral register, which the Champion published.

He moved to the Irish Times newspaper after a spell in London, and advanced to the position of deputy editor. He currently writes a weekly opinion article for the Irish Independent newspaper.

He was regarded as one of Ireland's leading political commentators and journalists, and published his autobiography in 2009, In My Own Time: Inside Irish Politics and Society. He died in Dublin in April 2016.
