= Mary Mathew =

- Born: 1724
- Died: 1777 (aged 52–53)

Mary Mathew (1724 – 1777) was an Irish diarist.

== Life ==
Mary Mathew was born in 1724, the daughter of Theobald Mathew (died 1699), a landowner of Thurles Castle, County Tipperary, and his third wife Catherine Nevill (died 1742) from Leicestershire, England. Her father had 5 children with his first wife, 1 with his second wife, and 4 with Catherine Nevill. The family were wealthy, and even though Mathew never married, she had independent means. Mathew lived in a rented house in Portmarnock, Dublin for a number of years, where she entertained. She also stayed with relatives including the Veseys in Abbeyleix and the Brownlows in Lurgan. In 1772 to 1773 Mathew kept a daily diary, along with highly detailed accounts spanning 20 years were published in 1991.

Her diary details a comfortable life, with outings of card-playing, balls and to the theatre. Mathew was a gardener, who also enjoyed walking. Her interests did not include literature, politics, religion or cultural matters. She was interested in charitable activities. She kept the diary dutifully from 1 August 1772 until 31 July 1773, not enjoying the pursuit, but wanting to adhere to the discipline of writing every day. The diary concludes: "This day ends the year of the journal. I think my time is spent in so trifling a manner 'tis not worth recording so here I end."

Mathew died in 1777. Whilst not containing any literary merit, her diary is a historically rare and useful glimpse into the life of an 18th century Irish spinster socialite.
