= Theobald Mathew (barrister, born 1898) =

British lawyer (1898–1964)

Sir Theobald Mathew, KBE, MC (4 November 1898 – 29 February 1964) was a British lawyer who served as Director of Public Prosecutions from 1944 to 1964, making him the longest-serving DPP.

Mathew was born in London, the son of Anna and Charles James Mathew and grandson of Lord Justice Mathew. He was educated at The Oratory School and Royal Military College, Sandhurst. During World War I, he served with the Irish Guards, and was awarded the Military Cross in 1918. He was appointed aide-de-camp to Lieutenant-General Sir Alexander Godley in 1919.

Mathew was called to the bar by Lincoln's Inn in 1921, but quit the bar to train as a solicitor in 1925, articling at Charles Russell & Co., whose senior partner, Sir Charles Russell, was his wife's uncle. He was admitted as a solicitor in 1928 and became a partner of Charles Russell & Co. In 1941, he joined the Home Office, and in 1942 became head of its Criminal Division.

He was appointed Director of Public Prosecutions in October 1944, having been recommended to the Prime Minister by Herbert Morrison, the Home Secretary, who had been impressed by Mathew's performance. He was the first solicitor to ever hold the office. In 1946 he was appointed Knight Commander of the Order of the British Empire.

In the late 1940s to the early 1950s, he directed a sustained campaign against homosexuality. Police used agents provocateurs to lure men into criminal offences. In 1960 he reluctantly authorised the prosecution of Penguin Books for obscenity after they published Lady Chatterley's Lover by D.H. Lawrence.

== Family ==
In 1923, he married Phyllis Helen Russell, granddaughter of Charles Russell, Baron Russell of Killowen, a former Lord Chief Justice of England.

Preceded by Edward Atkinson	Director of Public Prosecutions; 1944–1964	Succeeded by Norman Skelhorn
