= Mid Tipperary =

Former parliamentary constituency in the United Kingdom

- Former county constituency for the House of Commons

1885–1922
- Seats: 1
- Created from: County Tipperary
- Replaced by: Tipperary Mid, North and South

Mid Tipperary was a UK parliament constituency in Ireland, returning one Member of Parliament from 1885 to 1922. Prior to the 1885 general election the area was part of the County Tipperary constituency. From 1922, on the establishment of the Irish Free State, it was not represented in the UK Parliament.

== Boundaries ==
This constituency comprised the central part of County Tipperary.

1885–1922: The baronies of Eliogarty, Ikerrin and Kilnamanagh Lower, that part of the barony of Kilnamanagh Upper not contained within the constituency of North Tipperary, and that part of the barony of Slievardagh contained in the parishes of Ballingarry, Buolick, Fennor, Kilcooly and Lickfinn.

== Members of Parliament ==
Election	Member	Party
1885	Thomas Mayne	Irish Parliamentary
1890	Henry Harrison	Irish Parliamentary
1892	John McCarthy	Irish National Federation
1893(b)	James Francis Hogan	Irish National Federation
1900	Kendal Edmund O'Brien	Irish Parliamentary
Jan 1910	John Hackett	Irish Parliamentary
1918	Séamus Burke	Sinn Féin
1922	constituency abolished	

== Elections ==
=== Elections in the 1880s ===
1885 general election: Mid Tipperary
Party	Candidate	Votes	%	±%
Irish Parliamentary	Thomas Mayne	3,804	93.7	
Irish Conservative	George Edward Ryan	255	6.3	
Majority		3,549	87.4	
Turnout		4,059	62.3	
Registered electors		6,517		
Irish Parliamentary win (new seat)				

1886 general election: Mid Tipperary
Party	Candidate	Votes	%	±%
Irish Parliamentary	Thomas Mayne	Unopposed		
Registered electors		6,517		
Irish Parliamentary hold				

=== Elections in the 1890s ===
Mayne resigns, prompting a by-election.

By-election, 1890: Mid Tipperary
Party	Candidate	Votes	%	±%
Irish Parliamentary	Henry Harrison	Unopposed		
Registered electors		7,276		
Irish Parliamentary hold				

1892 general election: Mid Tipperary
Party	Candidate	Votes	%	±%
Irish National Federation	John McCarthy	3,284	72.7	N/A
Irish National League	Michael Conway	887	19.6	N/A
Irish Unionist	William Heaton-Armstrong	346	7.7	New
Majority		2,397	53.1	N/A
Turnout		4,517	59.5	N/A
Registered electors		7,596		
Irish National Federation gain from Irish Parliamentary		Swing	N/A	

McCarthy dies, causing a by-election.

By-election, 1893: Mid Tipperary
Party	Candidate	Votes	%	±%
Irish National Federation	James Francis Hogan	Unopposed		
Registered electors		7,482		
Irish National Federation hold				

1895 general election: Mid Tipperary
Party	Candidate	Votes	%	±%
Irish National Federation	James Francis Hogan	Unopposed		
Registered electors		7,127		
Irish National Federation hold				

=== Elections in the 1900s ===
1900 general election: Mid Tipperary
Party	Candidate	Votes	%	±%
Irish Parliamentary	Kendal Edmund O'Brien	2,316	79.8	N/A
Healyite Nationalist	Florence O'Driscoll	587	20.2	N/A
Majority		1,729	59.6	N/A
Turnout		2,903	42.8	N/A
Registered electors		6,776		
Irish Parliamentary hold		Swing	N/A	

1906 general election: Mid Tipperary
Party	Candidate	Votes	%	±%
Irish Parliamentary	Kendal Edmund O'Brien	Unopposed		
Registered electors		5,997		
Irish Parliamentary hold				

=== Elections in the 1910s ===
January 1910 general election: Mid Tipperary
Party	Candidate	Votes	%	±%
Irish Parliamentary	John Hackett	Unopposed		
Registered electors		6,105		
Irish Parliamentary hold				

December 1910 general election: Mid Tipperary
Party	Candidate	Votes	%	±%
Irish Parliamentary	John Hackett	2,440	58.7	N/A
All-for-Ireland	Martin O'Dwyer	1,716	41.3	N/A
Majority		724	17.4	N/A
Turnout		4,156	68.1	N/A
Registered electors		6,105		
Irish Parliamentary hold		Swing	N/A	

1918 general election: Mid Tipperary
Party	Candidate	Votes	%	±%
Sinn Féin	Séamus Burke	Unopposed		
Registered electors		17,458		
Sinn Féin gain from Irish Parliamentary				
