= St. Joseph's Cemetery, Cork =

Cemetery in Cork, Ireland

Coordinates: 51°53′06″N 08°28′21″W

St. Joseph's Cemetery, Cork, was established for the burials for the poor, by temperance campaigner Father Mathew in 1830 when he leased land from the Botanical Gardens. It was sometimes called Father Mathew Cemetery. It was extended in 1880, and Fr. Mathew is buried in the cemetery. A large number of victims of the Great Famine are buried on the site, many in unmarked graves.

There are also 24 burials of those who died from the 1914-1918 war and 4 from the 1939-1945 war here, maintained by the Commonwealth War Graves Commission.

Cork Corporation took over the cemetery in 1968.

The Society of African Missions Church (St. Joseph's) in Wilton, Cork, has a graveyard beside it confusingly also called St. Joseph's Cemetery. There are other cemeteries in Cork called St. Joseph's, among them St. Joseph's Cemetery Mallow, and St. Joseph's Cemetery Little Island.
