= East Mayo (UK Parliament constituency) =

Former parliamentary constituency in the United Kingdom

- Former county constituency for the House of Commons

1885–1922
- Seats: 1
- Created from: County Mayo
- Replaced by: Sligo–Mayo East

East Mayo was a parliamentary constituency in Ireland, which returned one Member of Parliament (MP) to the House of Commons of the Parliament of the United Kingdom from 1885 to 1922.

Prior to the 1885 general election the area was part of the County Mayo constituency. From 1922, on the establishment of the Irish Free State, it was not represented in the UK Parliament.

== Boundaries ==
This constituency comprised the eastern part of County Mayo.

1885–1922: That part of the barony of Costello not contained within the constituency of South Mayo and that part of the barony of Gallen not contained within the constituency of North Mayo.

== Members of Parliament ==
Years	Member	Party
1885–1890	John Dillon	Irish Parliamentary Party
1891–1900	John Dillon	Irish National Federation
1900–1918	John Dillon	Irish Parliamentary Party
1918–1922	Éamon de Valera	Sinn Féin

== Elections ==
=== Elections in the 1880s ===
General election 27 November 1885: East Mayo
Party	Candidate	Votes	%	±%
Irish Parliamentary	John Dillon	Unopposed		
Registered electors		8,149		
Irish Parliamentary win (new seat)				

General election 6 July 1886: East Mayo
Party	Candidate	Votes	%	±%
Irish Parliamentary	John Dillon	Unopposed		
Registered electors		8,149		
Irish Parliamentary hold				

=== Elections in the 1890s ===
General election 13 July 1892: East Mayo
Party	Candidate	Votes	%	±%
Irish National Federation	John Dillon	2,464	90.6	N/A
Irish National League	John Fitzgibbon	257	9.4	N/A
Majority		2,207	81.2	N/A
Turnout		2,721	42.6	N/A
Registered electors		6,387		
Irish National Federation gain from Irish Parliamentary		Swing	N/A	

General election 19 July 1895: East Mayo
Party	Candidate	Votes	%	±%
Irish National Federation	John Dillon	Unopposed		
Registered electors		7,966		
Irish National Federation hold				

=== Elections in the 1900s ===
General election 3 October 1900: East Mayo
Party	Candidate	Votes	%	±%
Irish Parliamentary	John Dillon	Unopposed		
Registered electors		8,225		
Irish Parliamentary hold				

General election 19 January 1906: East Mayo
Party	Candidate	Votes	%	±%
Irish Parliamentary	John Dillon	Unopposed		
Registered electors		8,029		
Irish Parliamentary hold				

=== Elections in the 1910s ===
General election 18 January 1910: East Mayo
Party	Candidate	Votes	%	±%
Irish Parliamentary	John Dillon	Unopposed		
Registered electors		7,816		
Irish Parliamentary hold				

General election 6 December 1910: East Mayo
Party	Candidate	Votes	%	±%
Irish Parliamentary	John Dillon	Unopposed		
Registered electors		7,816		
Irish Parliamentary hold				

General Election 14 December 1918: East Mayo
Party	Candidate	Votes	%	±%
Sinn Féin	Éamon de Valera	8,975	66.5	New
Irish Parliamentary	John Dillon	4,514	33.5	N/A
Majority		4,461	33.0	N/A
Turnout		13,489	62.3	N/A
Registered electors		21,635		
Sinn Féin gain from Irish Parliamentary		Swing	N/A	
