= John Dillon =

Irish politician; the last leader of the Irish Parliamentary Party (1851–1927)

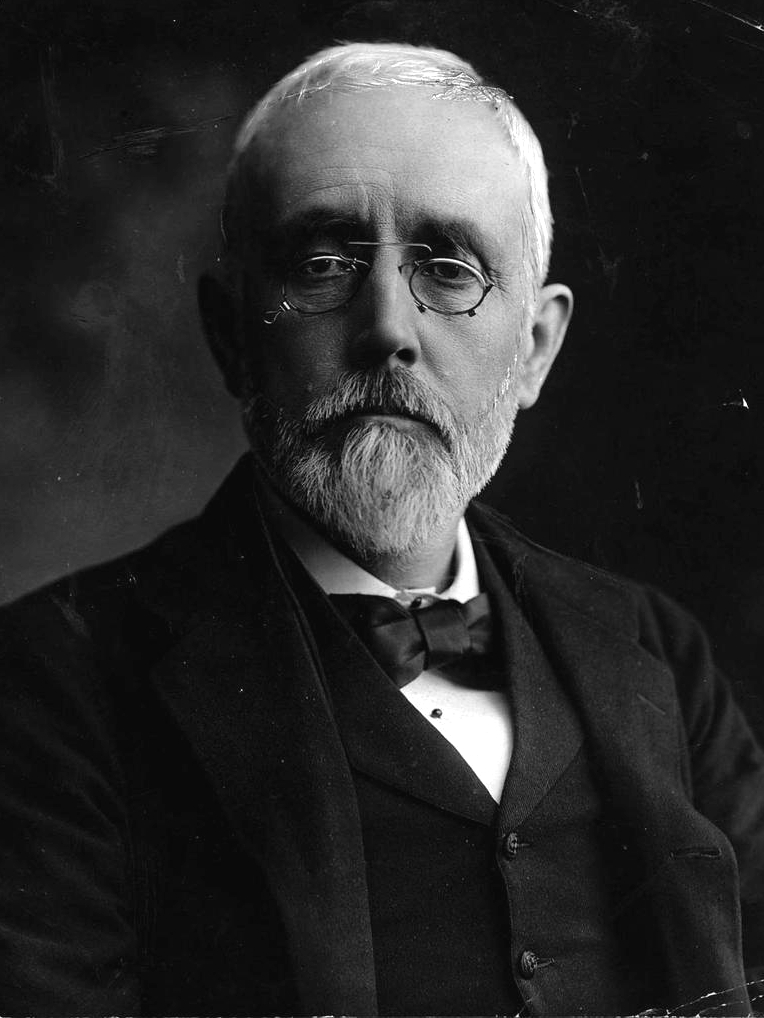
- Dillon, c. 1915

Member of Parliament for East Mayo
- In office 27 November 1885 – 14 December 1918
- Preceded by: Constituency established
- Succeeded by: Éamon de Valera

Member of Parliament for County Tipperary
- In office 8 April 1880 – 23 March 1883 Serving with Patrick James Smyth
- Preceded by: Stephen Moore; Edmund Dwyer Gray
- Succeeded by: Patrick James Smyth; Thomas Mayne

Leader of the Irish Parliamentary Party
- In office 6 March 1918 – 14 December 1918
- Preceded by: John Redmond
- Succeeded by: Joseph Devlin

Leader of the Irish National Federation
- In office 1892–1900
- Preceded by: Justin McCarthy
- Succeeded by: Merged into IPP

Personal details
- Born: 4 September 1851 Blackrock, Dublin, Ireland
- Died: 4 August 1927 (aged 75) London, England
- Party: Irish Parliamentary Party; Irish National Federation; Home Rule League
- Spouse: Elizabeth Mathew (m. 1895; died 1907)
- Relations: Anne Deane (aunt)
- Children: 6, including Myles Dillon and James Dillon
- Parent: John Blake Dillon (father)
- Education: Catholic University School; Trinity College Dublin; Catholic University of Louvain; Royal College of Surgeons

John Dillon (4 September 1851 – 4 August 1927) was an Irish politician from Dublin, who served as a Member of Parliament (MP) for over 35 years and was the leader of the Irish Parliamentary Party. By political disposition, Dillon was an advocate of Irish nationalism, originally a follower of Charles Stewart Parnell, supporting land reform and Irish Home Rule.

== Early life ==
John Dillon was born in Blackrock, Dublin, a son of the former "Young Irelander" John Blake Dillon (1814–1866). Following the premature death of both his parents, he was partly raised by his father's niece, Anne Deane. He was educated at Catholic University School, at Trinity College Dublin and at the Catholic University of Louvain in Belgium. He afterwards studied medicine at the Royal College of Surgeons in Dublin, then ceased active involvement in medicine after he joined Isaac Butt's Home Rule League in 1873, winning notice in 1879 when he attacked Butt's weak parliamentary handling of Irish Home Rule.

Finances were strained until John's uncle Charles bequeathed him his house, 2 North Great George's Street, Dublin in 1898, and a business in Ballaghadereen, County Mayo was bequeathed him by his cousin Anne Deane in 1905. His family's financial means enabled him to turn and devote all his energies to political life, while his wife ran the business.

He became a leading land reform agitator as a member of the original committee of the Irish National Land League, spearheading the policy of "boycotting" advocated by Michael Davitt with whom he was allied in close friendship. He entered the Parliament of the United Kingdom in 1880 as member for County Tipperary, and was at first an ardent supporter of Charles Stewart Parnell. He travelled to the United States with Parnell on a fund-raising mission for the Land League. On his return, he denounced William Ewart Gladstone's Land Law (Ireland) Act 1881 as achieving nothing for small farmers. His views on agrarian reform and on Home Rule led him to be branded an extremist, which resulted in his arrest from May until August 1881 under the Irish Coercion Act.

== Radical reformer ==
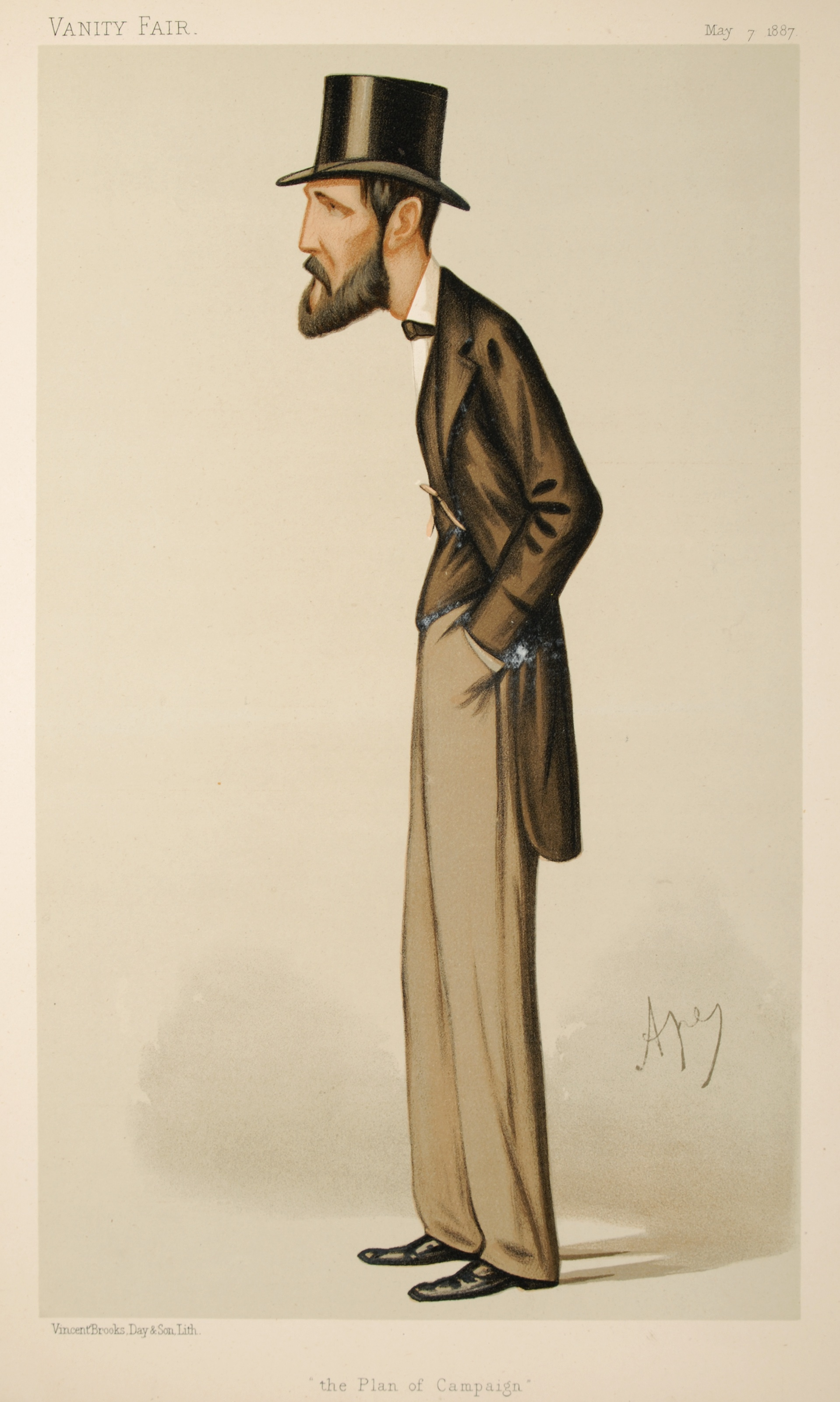
"The Plan of Campaign". Caricature by Ape published in Vanity Fair in 1887

Again imprisoned for agitation in October 1881 together with Parnell, William O'Brien and others in Kilmainham Gaol, he signed the No Rent Manifesto in solidarity although not fully in agreement with it. Parnell sought to end the Land War by agreeing to the Kilmainham Treaty after which they were released from prison in May 1882. Shortly afterwards they received the freedom of the city of Dublin. Unhappy with Parnell's "New Departure" and because his health had suffered, he resigned his seat in Parliament on 6 March 1883, and retired from politics to Colorado in America where his brother lived. Returning in 1885, Parnell nominated him as the Irish Parliamentary Party candidate for East Mayo in the general election in November 1885, where he was returned unopposed. He represented the constituency without a break until 1918.

He was one of the prime movers in the Irish Land League's famous Plan of Campaign instigated by Timothy Healy and organised by Timothy Harrington, which provided, that in the case of excessive rents the tenant should pay his rent to the Land League instead of the landlord, and in case of eviction be supported by the general fund. Dillon was compelled by the Court of Queens Bench in December 1886 to find securities for good behaviour, but two days later he was arrested while receiving rents on Lord Clanricarde's estate at Portumna, County Galway. In this instance, the jury disagreed, but in April 1887 he was again imprisoned under Coercion and upon release, he resumed agrarian agitation with a speech during a demonstration in September where O'Brien was on trial in Mitchelstown during which the crowd threw stones at the police who then shot three civilians, known as the "Mitchelstown massacre". When in 1888 he defended Munster farmers he was again imprisoned for six months under the provisions of the new Criminal Law Procedure Bill, or Coercion Act. In all he was imprisoned six times.

== Anti-Parnellite course ==
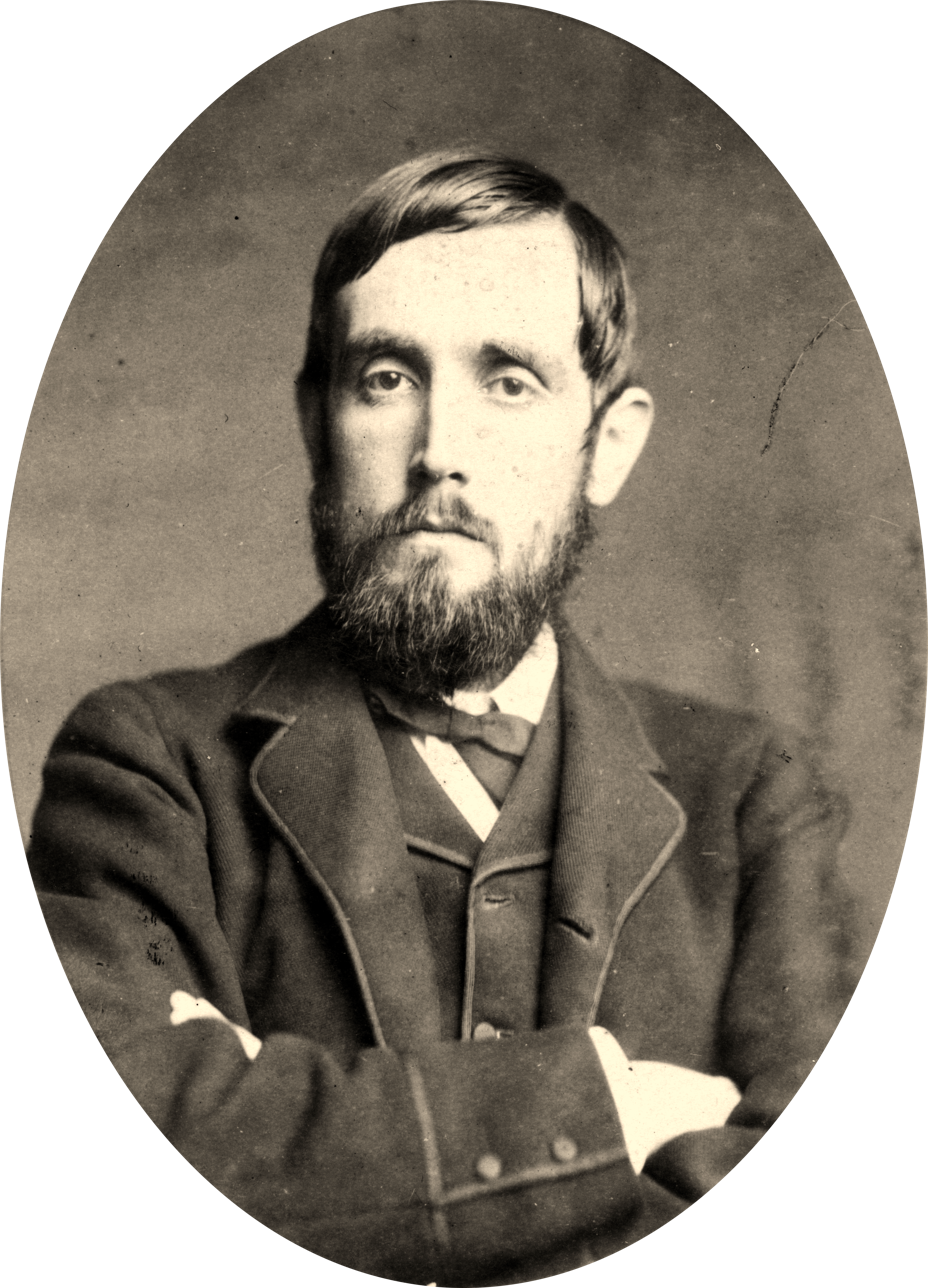
A portrait style photograph of Dillon, c. the 1880s

He was released in September, and in the spring of 1889 sailed for Australia and New Zealand, where he collected funds for the Nationalist party. On his return to Ireland he was again arrested, but, being allowed bail, sailed to America, and failed to appear at the trial. He returned to Ireland by way of Boulogne, where he and William O'Brien held long and indecisive discussions with Parnell after his divorce crisis over his continued leadership of the Irish Parliamentary Party. When these broke down they surrendered to the police in February, and were interned in Galway gaol from where they were released in July 1890.

Both he and O'Brien had become increasingly perturbed with the tenor of Irish politics as epitomised by Timothy Healy. After Parnell's divorce case, the leader refused to step down and the party split. Dillon was one of his strongest opponents and joined the majority anti-Parnellite block, the Irish National Federation (INF), with Justin McCarthy becoming its leader. John Redmond led the minority pro-Parnellite Irish National League (INL) after Parnell's death later in 1891. When the Liberals reclaimed office in 1892 Dillon took part in the negotiations on the second Home Rule Bill, the Irish Government Bill 1893, which was rejected by the House of Lords. Although he never lost sight of home rule or the land question, particularly the evicted tenants, he now concentrated on the day-to-day running of the INF as deputy chairman.

== Party manoeuvrings ==
When home rule became postponed after the Conservative Party returned to power in 1895, Dillon took the opportunity to expel Healy from his influence in the party. He also opposed Horace Plunkett in his attempts to bring Unionists and Nationalists together, and his efforts to help small farmers through his cooperative movement. In November Dillon married Elizabeth Mathew at the Brompton Oratory who bore him six children. In February 1896 he took over as chairman of the INF on McCarthy's resignation. That autumn he arranged a convention of the Irish race, which included 2,000 delegates from various parts of the world. In 1897 Dillon opposed in the House of Commons the Address to Queen Victoria on the occasion of the Diamond Jubilee, on the ground that her reign had not been a blessing to Ireland, and he showed the same uncompromising attitude in 1901 when a grant to Lord Roberts was under discussion, accusing him of systematised inhumanity. He was suspended on 20 March 1902 for violent language addressed to Joseph Chamberlain, calling the Colonial Secretary a "damned liar".

Dillon was present in January 1898 when William O'Brien launched his "United Ireland League" (UIL) from an agrarian platform in Ballina, County Mayo. Though helping to establish its constitution Dillon was very ambivalent about this new association, marking the first strains in the O'Brien-Dillon relationship. The year was also eventful with the attainment of the Local Government (Ireland) Act 1898 which put the administration of local affairs into Irish hands, not at all favoured by Dillon before attaining full Home Rule. O'Brien's UIL spread rapidly, forcing the divided factions, the INL and the INF, of the Irish Parliamentary Party to reunite under Redmond in 1900, with Dillon as deputy Party leader. He faithfully supported Redmond in the following years.

== Conciliation unthinkable ==
Dillon played a decisive role in opposing O'Brien's "doctrine of conciliation" in Irish politics, especially during the 1902 Land Conference and after O'Brien won the subsequent Wyndham Land Purchase (Ireland) Act 1903. O'Brien was viciously attacked by Dillon, who bore an instinctive dislike of negotiations with landlords, unwilling to accommodate the landlord class, he never shed his mistrust of dialogue with Unionists. His theory was that agrarian unrest better favoured achieving Home Rule by putting relentless pressure on landlords and the government. His attacks and those of the party's Freeman's Journal alienated O'Brien who left the Party in November 1903. O'Brien's engagement during 1904–5 with the Irish Reform Association and his appraising of the 1907 Irish Council Bill were equally condemned by Dillon who despised all dealings with the "hereditary enemy". The ensuing breach never healed. Dillon subsequently gained control of the UIL through his protégé, its new secretary Joseph Devlin, MP for Belfast West, with whom Dillon always maintained a close alliance.

With the UIL and the IPP practically fused into a single body, Dillon later had MP members associated with O'Brien's policy of conciliation, amongst them Thomas O'Donnell and D. D. Sheehan, expelled as "factionists" from the party. The Home Rule Movement, influenced very greatly by Dillon, reverted to a narrow traditional stand, which opposed any chance of an inclusive nationalism and failed to include new interests within Catholic society. His Home Rule Movement was largely a confessional ethnic body, sustained largely by the Ancient Order of Hibernians, an exclusively Catholic and secret fraternity, largely under the control of his close associate Joe Devlin. Dillion's Home Rule Movement was characterised by permanent class war and did not facilitate the working of the Wyndham Land Act; conflict above victory.

Dillon suffered occasional health incapacities causing irregular attendance at Westminster, particularly when his wife died in 1907 though after the Liberals returned to power in 1906, he was more often consulted. Between 1910 and 1914 the Irish Home Rule question re-emerged, introduced by Prime Minister H. H. Asquith. In his approach to Irish self-government under Home Rule took a more uncompromising stand than Redmond's, who during the Ulster crisis of 1913 was prepared to concede a large measure of local autonomy to Ulster. On 15 and 16 January Dillon spent lunch at the Commons with one of his closest supporters, Guardian editor, C. P. Scott, and ardent home ruler, he urged the Irish leader to lobby the new Labour MPs. It was unthinkable for Dillon, who put the integrity of Ireland foremost: he poured scorn on Edward Carson's Ulster Unionist Party and their Ulster Volunteers' threat of civil war as being a gigantic bluff. Scott courted Dillon's opinion most assiduously at the Bath Club and his Manchester home in favour of "gradual strengthening of the military force in Ulster", without support the police might "cave in altogether". "Incredibly weak" Dillon was unable to prevent Carson's amendments to Crewe's Home Rule bill. Likewise Dillon condemned O'Brien's new All-for-Ireland League's proposals for concessions to Ulster as encouraging their demands. He remained inflexible at various meetings, including the 1914 Buckingham Palace Conference's endeavour to settle the problem of Ulster. He agreed only reluctantly to Redmond conceding to six counties temporarily opting out of the Home Rule Act 1914, which in September received Royal Assent but was suspended for the duration of World War I.

Dillon was a strong opponent of giving women the vote, telling a group of women that "women's suffrage will I believe, be the ruin of our western civilisation. It will destroy the home, challenging the headship of man, laid down by God. It may come in your time - I hope not in mine."

== Uncompromising stand for peace ==
With the outbreak of the Great War Dillon accepted Redmond's decision to follow Britain's support of the Allied war effort, but he abstained from recruiting for the Irish divisions. The 1916 Rising took the Irish Party by surprise. He intervened with David Lloyd George to halt the 90 sentences of execution pronounced by "field court-martial" (in camera without defence or jury) under martial law by General Maxwell after he declared the rebellion "treason in time of war". He told Scott his party must support Conscription or lose the election. But on 10 January, they did just that "to make their protest" with Lib-Lab assistance. Dillon insisted that if they went ahead they would "fill the whole country" with the same type of radicals, as opposed to imprisonment. This would leave the radicals with as many supporters as could "fit in a single gaol cell". He attacked the Government in the House of Commons and declared that the rebels were "wrong", but had fought "a clean fight". Intervention to halt the executions after the 15th; an unbridgeable chasm in Anglo-Irish relations. The secret trials and executions had changed public opinion into sympathy for the rebels. He was involved in May 1916 with Lloyd George's futile attempt to implement Home Rule after the Rising, which failed in July on the issue of the exclusion or not of Ulster. He declined a nomination to the Irish Convention on Home Rule in 1917.

After Redmond's death on 6 March 1918, Dillon returned to Ireland to take up the party leadership. When the allied armies on the Western Front were hit and thrown into a temporary severe retreat by the German spring offensive, which decimated the 10th and 16th Irish divisions, the Government attempted a month later in panic to extend conscription to Ireland, which Dillon opposed with tenacity, and in protest withdrew all Irish Members from the House of Commons. The attempt to impose conscription jointly linked with implementing Home Rule disgusted the wider Irish public and resulted in an immediate swing of support to Sinn Féin which precipitated their election landslide after the war.

Dillon attempted to persuade the Government in July 1918 to implement Irish self-government by introducing a motion for self-determination in the Commons. He made clear in September that the goal of Home Rule could only be "the establishment of national self-government, including full and complete executive, legislative and fiscal power", and that national solidarity was essential. But he completely underestimated the need to offer provisions for Ulster concerns, a fatal misjudgement shared by most Nationalists and Republicans alike.

It was left to Dillon to fight a last campaign in the general election of December 1918. After a failure to reach a pact with Sinn Féin, his party was swept into oblivion. He was defeated in East Mayo by Éamon de Valera's 8,975 votes to his 4,514. Retiring from politics, Dillon was not spared witnessing the violent epoch of the Anglo-Irish War, the implementation of Home Rule in Northern Ireland, the ensuing Partition of Ireland endorsed by the Irish Free State and the resulting Irish Civil War.

== Family ==
Dillon married in 1895 to Elizabeth Matthew, daughter of Lord Justice J. C. Mathew, who bore him one daughter and five sons; John Dillon (1896–1970), Anne Elizabeth Dillon (born 29 Oct 1897), Theobald Wolfe Tone Dillon (1898–1946), Myles Dillon (1900–1972), James Dillon (1902–1986), and Brian Dillon.

One of his six children was James Mathew Dillon, a prominent Irish politician and leader of the National Centre Party and of Fine Gael (1957–1966), also Minister for Agriculture.

Tall and slim he cut an imposing figure, his personal reputation hampered at times by a pessimistic and gloomy nature as well as conservative views on labour and women. He died in a London nursing home at the age of 76, on 4 August 1927, and was buried four days later in Glasnevin cemetery, Dublin. There is a street named after him in Dublin's Liberties, beside the old Iveagh Market.

== Commemoration ==
John Dillon Street in Dublin city is named after him.

== Notes ==
Bibliography

- Lyons, F. S. L. (1968). John Dillon: A biography. London: Routledge & Kegan Paul. ISBN 0-7100-2887-3.
- Maume, Patrick (1999). Who's Who in The long gestation. London: Gill & Macmillan. ISBN 0-7171-2744-3.
- Hickey, D. J.; Doherty, J. E. (2003). A new Dictionary of Irish History from 1800. Gill & MacMillan. ISBN 0-7171-2520-3.
- unknown (1990). "John Dillon". Irish Dictionary of National Biography.
- Callanan, Frank; Quinn, James (2009). McGuire, James (ed.). "John Dillon". Dictionary of Irish Biography, from the Earliest Times to the Year 2002. 3. Dublin: Royal Irish Academy: Cambridge University Press. ISBN 978-0-521-19976-6.
- D. D. Sheehan. Ireland Since Parnell at Project Gutenberg

Parliament of the United Kingdom
Preceded by Stephen Moore and Edmund Dwyer Gray	Member of Parliament for County Tipperary; 1880–1883; With: Patrick James Smyth	Succeeded by Thomas Mayne and Patrick James Smyth
New constituency	Member of Parliament for Mayo East; 1885–1918	Succeeded by Éamon de Valera
