= William James Middleton =

British World War I flying ace

- Born: 1897; Horton Kirby, Kent, England
- Died: 4 October 1918 (aged 20–21)
- Burial place: Bronfay Farm Military Cemetery, Bray-sur-Somme; 49°58′03″N 2°44′35″E
- Military career
- Allegiance: United Kingdom
- Branch: Royal Naval Air Service; Royal Air Force
- Rank: Sergeant-Observer
- Unit: No. 5 (Naval) Squadron/No. 205 Squadron RAF
- Awards: Distinguished Flying Medal; Médaille d'Honneur des Affaires Étrangères pour actes de courage et dévouement (France)

Sergeant-Observer William James Middleton DFM (1897 – 4 October 1918) was a British World War I flying ace credited with six aerial victories.

== Military service ==
Middleton initially served in the Royal Naval Air Service, as a member of No. 5 (Naval) Squadron of the Royal Naval Air Service, flying the Airco DH.4 two-seater day bomber. He gained his first aerial victory on 9 March 1918, driving down an Albatros D.V out of control over Mont-d'Origny, while being piloted by Lieutenant G. E. Siedle. Soon after, on 1 April, the Royal Naval Air Service and the Army's Royal Flying Corps were merged to form the Royal Air Force, and Middleton's unit became No. 205 Squadron RAF.

Middleton gained his next victory on 23 April, driving down a Fokker Dr.I triplane over Chaulnes. On 3 May he took part in the driving down and the shooting down in flames of two Pfalz D.IIIs between Chaulnes and Rosières, shared with nine other aircraft of his squadron, including Captain Euan Dickson and his gunner Charles Robinson, and pilots Captain John Gamon and Lieutenants William Elliott and William Grossart. On 10 August, with Captain J. M. Mason as his pilot, he destroyed another Pfalz D.III over Brie Bridge, and on 4 September, with Lieutenant D. J. T. Mellor, he gained his sixth and final victory by driving down a Fokker D.VII over Roisel.

Middleton was awarded the Distinguished Flying Medal, which was gazetted on 20 September 1918. His citation read:

No. F.16604 Aircraftman 1st Class (Gunlayer) William James Middleton.

"He has taken part in 67 raids and has shown conspicuous gallantry and skill in bombing enemy lines of communication, dumps and aerodromes. On one occasion he obtained six direct hits, despite intense anti-aircraft fire."

Middleton died from wounds received in action on 4 October 1918, and is buried at the Bronfay Farm Military Cemetery, Bray-sur-Somme, Picardy.

He was also awarded the Médaille d'Honneur pour actes de courage et dévouement pour le personnel militaire étranger ("Medal of Honour of Foreign Affairs for Foreign Military Personnel") by the French government, which was gazetted posthumously on 22 August 1919.

== Bibliography ==
- Franks, Norman; Guest, Russell; Alegi, Gregory (2008). Above The War Fronts: A Complete Record of the British Two-seater Bomber Pilot and Observer Aces, the British Two-seater Fighter Observer Aces, and the Belgian, Italian, Austro-Hungarian and Russian Fighter Aces, 1914-1918. Grub Street Publishing. ISBN 1898697566, ISBN 978-1898697565
