= Charles Lupton =

British World War I flying ace

Charles Roger Lupton
- Born: 27 January 1898; Potternewton, Yorkshire, England
- Died: 9 May 1918 (aged 20)
- Burial place: Vignacourt British Cemetery, Somme, France; 50°00′33″N 2°12′23″E
- Military career
- Allegiance: United Kingdom
- Branch: Royal Navy; Royal Air Force
- Service years: 1916–1918
- Rank: Captain
- Unit: No. 5 (Naval) Squadron/No. 205 Squadron RAF
- Conflicts: World War I; Western Front
- Awards: Distinguished Service Cross & Bar

Captain Charles Roger Lupton DSC* (27 January 1898 – 9 May 1918) was a British World War I flying ace credited with five aerial victories.

== Biography ==
Lupton was the only surviving son of Charles Lupton OBE JP DL, solicitor and co-founder of the law firm DLA Piper, alderman, and Lord Mayor of Leeds 1915–16, and his wife Katharine, of Carr Head, Roundhay. His mother was the fourth daughter of Thomas Ashton, DL, of Ford Bank, Didsbury, Manchester, two of whose sons were Thomas Gair Ashton MP, who became Lord Ashton of Hyde, and Samuel Edgar Ashton.

Lupton was educated at Hillbrow and Rugby Schools, leaving the latter in July 1916, before he was 18, to join the Royal Naval Air Service. He was commissioned as a temporary flight sub-lieutenant on 20 July 1916, and was granted Royal Aero Club Aviator's Certificate No. 3734, flying a Maurice Farman biplane at RNAS Eastbourne, on 14 September 1916.

He first served at home stations, and at Prawle Point in April 1917 he met with a serious accident which incapacitated him for two months. He was sent to Dunkirk in August 1917, when posted to No. 5 (Naval) Squadron flying the Airco DH.4 two-seater day bomber. Lupton gained his first victory on 28 September, driving down out of control an Albatros D.V over Blankenberge, and repeated the feat on 8 December over Aertrycke airfield. His crewman for both was Aerial Gun Layer Smith, and the second victory was shared with Flight Sub-Lieutenant John Gamon and AGL Winter.

On 18 December 1917 he and two other officers were awarded the Distinguished Service Cross for their part in a bombing raid. The citation read:

Flight Sub-Lieutenant Charles Roger Lupton, RNAS.
Flight Sub-Lieutenant Euan Dickson, RNAS.
Observer Sub-Lieutenant William Lawrence Hill, RNAS.

"For conspicuous gallantry and devotion to duty in a bombing raid on Thourout Railway Station and Varsennaere Aerodrome on 25 October 1917. These officers volunteered for the expedition in spite of extremely unfavourable weather conditions. They have all previously taken part in many bombing raids."

Lupton was promoted to flight lieutenant on 31 December 1917, and was appointed an acting flight commander in January 1918. In March his squadron moved further south, and on the 22nd of that month Lupton, now flying with AGL A. G. Wood, drove down another Albatros D.V south-west of Vendhuile. He was awarded a second Distinguished Service Cross, which was gazetted posthumously on 4 June 1918. His citation read:

Flight Lieutenant (Acting Flight Commander) Charles Roger Lupton, DSC, RNAS.

"For conspicuous bravery and skill in leading bombing formations, especially on 26 March 1918, when he carried out at low altitudes four bombing raids on enemy communications. In the course of these raids he caused great damage to enemy transport, and inflicted serious casualties on large numbers of their reinforcements. He has carried out very many bombing raids, and by his courage and resource has instilled a spirit of confidence and daring in all those who have flown with him."

When the Royal Naval Air Service and the Army's Royal Flying Corps were merged to form the Royal Air Force on 1 April, Lupton was promoted to captain, and No. 5 (Naval) Squadron became No. 205 Squadron RAF. A week later, on 6 April 1918, he sent a Fokker Dr.I down in flames north-east of Villers-Bretonneux, and the following day drove down a Pfalz D.III over Lamotte.

Lupton was killed in action, after colliding with a French aircraft at an altitude of 4,000 feet (1,200 m), while returning from a raid over the German lines, on 9 May 1918. He was 20 years old. He is buried at the British Cemetery at Vignacourt, and commemorated on the memorial in St Johns Church, Roundhay.
