= Handley Page HP.14 =

HP.14 / Type R/200

General information
- Type: Carrier Based Reconnaissance Aircraft
- Manufacturer: Handley Page
- Status: Prototype
- Number built: 3

History
- First flight: 1917

The Handley Page HP.14, also designated Handley Page R/200 was a prototype British naval reconnaissance aircraft of World War I, capable of operating from the decks of the Royal Navy's aircraft carriers or as a floatplane. Only three were built, the Parnall Panther being preferred.

== Design and development ==
The R/200 was designed in 1917 to meet an Admiralty requirement for a two-seat reconnaissance fighter capable of operating either as a floatplane or from the Royal Navy's new aircraft carriers, the flush deck HMS Argus and the partly converted cruiser HMS Furious. The R/200 was a small single-bay biplane powered by a 200 hp (149 kW) geared Hispano-Suiza 8 V-8 engine with a frontal radiator. Handley Page received an order for six prototypes in summer 1917.

The first two prototypes, fitted with floats were flown in December 1917, with the third prototype, fitted with a wheeled undercarriage flying in February 1918. Test results were poorer than the competing Parnall Panther, and as Handley Page was concentrating on production and development of the O/400 and V/1500 heavy bombers, the remaining three prototypes, together with a prospective production order for 20 aircraft were cancelled in March 1918.

== Specifications (R/200) (landplane) ==
Data from Handley Page Aircraft Since 1907

General characteristics

- Crew: 2
- Length: 25 ft 6 in (7.77 m)
- Wingspan: 36 ft 0 in (10.97 m)
- Height: 10 ft 9.5 in (3.289 m)
- Wing area: 390 sq ft (36 m^{2})
- Empty weight: 1,882 lb (854 kg)
- Max takeoff weight: 2,990 lb (1,356 kg)
- Powerplant: 1 × Hispano-Suiza 8B V-8 water-cooled piston engine, 200 hp (150 kW)
- Propellers: 2-bladed fixed-pitch propeller

Performance

- Maximum speed: 95 mph (153 km/h, 83 kn) at 6,500 ft (1,981 m)
- Service ceiling: 12,000 ft (3,700 m)
- Time to altitude: 10,000 ft (3,048 m) in 29 minutes 30 seconds
- Wing loading: 7.67 lb/sq ft (37.4 kg/m^{2})
- Power/mass: 0.067 hp/lb (0.110 kW/kg)

Armament

- Guns: 1x .303 in (7.70 mm) Lewis gun

== See also ==
Aircraft of comparable role, configuration, and era

- Parnall Panther
- Port Victoria Grain Griffin
