= Robert Barbour =

Robert Barbour may refer to:

- Robert Barbour (New South Wales politician) (1827–1895), Australian politician, merchant and squatter
- Robert Barbour (Victorian politician) (1845–1914), Australian politician
- Robert Barbour (RAF officer) (1895–1980), Scottish World War I flying ace
- Robert Barbour (cricketer) (1899–1994), Australian cricketer
- Robert Barbour (minister) (1921–2014), Church of Scotland minister and author
