= Howard Saint =

British flying ace

Howard John Thomas Saint
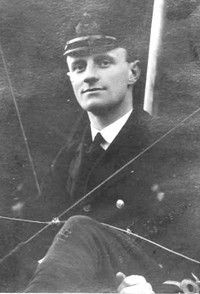
- Howard Saint
- Born: 20 January 1893; Ruabon, Denbighshire, Wales
- Died: September 1976 (aged 82–83); Hove, Sussex, England
- Military career
- Allegiance: United Kingdom
- Branch: Royal Navy; Royal Air Force
- Service years: 1914–1919; 1922–1927
- Rank: Captain
- Units: "B" Squadron, No. 5 Wing RNAS; No. 5 Squadron RNAS; No. 10 Squadron RNAS
- Conflicts: World War I • Western Front
- Awards: Distinguished Service Cross
- Other work: Test pilot

Captain Howard John Thomas Saint DSC (20 January 1893 – September 1976) was a Welsh First World War flying ace credited with seven aerial victories. He became the chief test pilot for the Gloster Aircraft Company in the 1930s.

== Early life ==
Saint was born in Ruabon, Denbighshire, on 20 January 1893, the son of Thomas and Margaret Saint, his father was a mining engineer and surveyor, and later a Colliery Manager. In the 1911 census Saint is described as a "Colliery Manager's Apprentice".

== World War I service ==
Saint was a student at Manchester University at the outbreak of the war, but gave up his studies to join the Royal Navy, serving with the Royal Naval Air Service's Armoured Car Division in France with the rank of chief petty officer. On 27 July 1915 he was granted a temporary commission in the Royal Naval Volunteer Reserve with the rank of sub-lieutenant. After completing his basic flight training, on 9 December he was granted Royal Aero Club Aviators' Certificate No. 2139 after soloing a Grahame-White biplane at the Grahame-White School at Hendon Aerodrome.

Saint was posted to No. 8 Flight, "B" Squadron, No. 5 Wing RNAS (later No. 205 Squadron RAF), in September 1916, flying Sopwith 1½ Strutters, engaged in bombing enemy-held ports. On 31 December his unit was redesignated No. 5 (Naval) Squadron RNAS. He was promoted to flight lieutenant on 30 June 1917, and on 26 July transferred to No. 10 (Naval) Squadron RNAS, where between 9 August and 20 October he claimed seven enemy aircraft shot down, while flying the Sopwith Triplane and Sopwith Camel single-seat fighters.

Saint was awarded the Distinguished Service Cross, which was gazetted on 30 October 1917. His citation read:

Acting Flight Commander Howard John Thomas Saint, RNAS.

"For conspicuous bravery in attacking superior hostile formations of enemy aircraft. On the 21st September 1917, he, with three other machines, attacked five hostile scouts. After getting to close quarters with one of them, he fired three bursts from his machine-gun and drove it down completely out of control. On the 23rd September 1917, while leading a patrol of eight scouts, he attacked a hostile formation of ten machines. One of these he drove down, diving vertically, out of control. He has forced down other machines. Completely out of control, one of them in flames; and has also shown great courage in attacking enemy troops and aerodromes with machine-gun fire from very low altitudes."

Shortly before, on 26 October, he was posted to the Aeroplane Experimental Unit (later the Aeroplane and Armament Experimental Establishment) at Martlesham Heath, serving there as a test pilot until the end of the war.

On 1 April 1918, the Royal Naval Air Service and the Army's Royal Flying Corps were merged to form the Royal Air Force. Saint was eventually transferred to the Royal Air Force's unemployed list on 3 January 1919.

=== List of aerial victories ===
Combat record
No.	Date/Time	Aircraft/ Serial No.	Opponent	Result	Location
1	9 August 1917 @1550	Sopwith Triplane (N5380)	Albatros D.III	Out of control	Polygon Wood
2	14 August 1917 @1615	Sopwith Triplane (N5380)	Albatros D.III	Destroyed in flames	Houthoulst Forest
3	21 August 1917 @0740	Sopwith Triplane (N6295)	Type C reconnaissance aircraft	Out of control	South of Roulers
4	25 August 1917 @0700	Sopwith Triplane (N6295)	Albatros D.V	Out of control	South of Roulers
5	21 September 1917 @1100	Sopwith Camel (B6201)	Albatros D.V	Out of control	Wervicq
6	23 September 1917 @1130	Sopwith Camel (N6341)	Albatros D.V	Out of control	Westroosebeke
7	20 October 1917 @1340	Sopwith Camel (N6341)	Albatros D.V	Destroyed	North-east of Diksmuide

== Postwar career ==
Saint joined Aircraft Transport and Travel, a subsidiary of Airco, as a commercial pilot, and on 1 May 1919 carried out the first civilian flight after the wartime ban was lifted. The flight, in a De Havilland DH.9 carrying newspapers from Hounslow to Bournemouth, did not go well as Saint made a forced landing on the Portsdown Hills and was injured.

Saint returned to the Royal Air Force on 13 March 1922, when granted a short service commission at the rank of flying officer, and served as a test pilot at the Royal Aircraft Factory. He was transferred to the Reserve of Air Force Officers (Class A) on 1 February 1927, and was then appointed chief test pilot of the Gloster Aircraft Company. Saint eventually relinquished his reserve commission on completion of his term of service on 1 February 1931. Gloster was bought by Hawker Aircraft Ltd. in 1934, and after Saint was replaced as chief test pilot by P. E. G. Sayer, he quit Gloster and worked for George Parnall and Company Ltd. After a year Parnall was bought out by Nash & Thompson, and moved away from aircraft production to concentrate on manufacturing gun turrets. Saint then worked as a Flying Control Officer at the Royal Aircraft Establishment at Farnborough until his retirement.

Saint retired to Hove, Sussex, and lived there until his death in September 1976 (although the Probate Records state that he died on 10 Aug 1976 in Cheltenham, Gloucestershire).
