= Frank William Foster =

RAF Wing Commander (DSM, DFC)

- Born: 10 April 1887; Paddington, London, England
- Died: 5 March 1963 (aged 75); Reading, Berkshire, England
- Military career
- Allegiance: United Kingdom
- Branch: Royal Navy; Royal Air Force
- Service years: 1903–1945
- Rank: Wing Commander
- Conflicts: World War I; Battle of Jutland; North Russia intervention; World War II
- Awards: Distinguished Flying Cross; Distinguished Service Medal

Wing Commander Frank William Foster DFC, DSM (10 April 1887, London — 5 March 1963, Reading). Although born in West London, he was brought up and educated in the village of Stockcross in Berkshire. He joined the Royal Navy in 1903 at the age of 16, and saw action in many theatres of World War I, including the Battle of Jutland, in which he gained the Distinguished Service Medal.

He transferred to the RAF in the latter part of the War, and was awarded the Distinguished Flying Cross for gallantry and devotion to duty in North Russia. At the cessation of activities he joined the little group of pioneers who were struggling to develop an aircraft carrier deck landing technique on an old converted cruiser — HMS Argus. During this period, he was in No. 205 Squadron RAF (Coastal Area, No.9 Group), based out of RAF Leuchars.

In 1927, trouble flared up on the North-West Frontiers of British India, and Flying Officer Foster was drafted with a squadron of old Bristol Fighters to police the Himalayas and keep order. This involved active duty for five years. As a form of relaxation, on one of his leaves he made a trek accompanied by an Indian guide to Tibet, visiting the district of Ladakh.

Returning from India in 1932, a short spell as radio and communications instructor followed, prior to a return to the sea in the ill-fated HMS Courageous. F/O Foster was transferred to a Coastal Command at Plymouth, a comparatively short time before HMS Courageous was sunk by enemy action. Coastal Command service led to promotion to the rank of Wing Commander, involving transfer to Western Approaches Command, Derby House, Liverpool, one of a number of vital communication centres for the three services. It figured in the tracking and final annihilation of the Bismarck. For his service he was mentioned in despatches three times, on 17 March 1941, 11 June 1942 and 14 January 1944.

Wing Commander Foster's service in World War II carried him beyond the normal retiring age, but the day had to come, of course, when he had to take leave of the services, in November 1945. Not for him however was the sedentary life of retirement. In January 1946, he joined the United Nations Relief and Rehabilitation Administration (UNRRA) as a Communications Officer, serving until the administration closed down in June 1948. The Ministry of Supply knew the Wing Commander next, and he became an experimental officer acting as a liaison between the Air Ministry and aircraft manufacturers. In December 1955 he had finally to retire from the active scene.

Wing Commander Foster had a wife, Edith, and two children, Harold and Betty - his home remained at Stockcross until the end of his life, when he was taken to the Battle Hospital in Reading after a long fight against Parkinson's disease. He died there on 5 March 1963, aged 75.

== Navy career ==
- 22 June 1903 - Volunteered
- 23 June 1903 - Boy 2nd Class, HMS Impregnable
- 21 January 1904 - Boy 1st Class
- 1 September 1904 - Signal Boy, HMS Hercules
- 22 November 1904 - HMS Sutlej
- 25 January 1905 - HMS Iphigenia
- 27 April 1905 - Signalman (signed up for 12 years service)
- 20 August 1905 - HMS Hogue
- 9 November 1905 - Qual. Sig.
- 13 February 1906 - HMS Tamar
- 13 March 1907 - HMS Spartiate
- 14 May 1907 - HMS Victory
- 1 October 1907 - Signalman
- 15 December 1907 - HMS Grafton
- 1 April 1908 - Leading Signalman
- 27 September 1908 - HMS Victory
- 7 January 1909 - HMS Hawke
- 1 March 1909 - HMS Tamar (Otter)
- 1 April 1909 - HMS King Alfred
- 1 October 1909 - HMS Tamar (Otter)
- 1 April 1910 - HMS Minotaur
- 16 August 1910 - HMS Tamar (Otter)
- 1 April 1911 - HMS Crescent
- 22 June 1911 - HMS Victory
- 28 January 1912 - HMS Arrogant
- 30 April 1912 - HMS Crescent
- 14 May 1912 - HMS Orontes (Albatross)
- 1 July 1912 - HMS Egmont
- 15 November 1913 - HMS Victory
- 1 October 1914 - Yeoman of Signals
- 23 October 1914 - HMS Emperor of India
- 19 June 1916 - Acting Signal Boatswain
- 19 October 1916 - HMS Superb (1st Battle Squadron)
- 11 August 1917 - Signal Boatswain

(Available naval records stop here)

== RAF career ==
- 27 July 1918 - Appointed Second Lieutenant Observer
- 22 December 1918 - Pilot Officer
- 6 May 1920 - Air Ministry
- 27 January 1920 - Promoted Observer Officer
- 15 July 1926 - Appointed Flying Officer (on abolition of title of Observer)
- 1 Nov 1928 - No.2 (Indian Wing) Station, Risalpur
- 19 June 1931 - Promoted Flight Lieutenant, General Duties Branch
- 30 June 1932 - HMS Courageous
- 1 July 1938 - Promoted Squadron Leader
- 24 April 1940 - Transferred to Technical Branch
- 1 December 1940 - Promoted Wing Commander (temporary) - placed on retired list and re-employed with RAF
- 11 November 1945 - Reverted to retired list, as Wing Commander

== Honours and awards ==
- Mons Star, Yeoman of Signals 1914/15
- Distinguished Service Medal - 15 September 1916 The following awards have been approved in connection with the recommendations of the Commander-in-Chief for services rendered by Petty Officers and men of the Grand Fleet in the action in the North Sea on the 31st May - 1 June 1916 - To receive the Distinguished Service Medal, Yeoman of Signals Frank William Foster, O.N 226416 (now Acting Signal Boatswain)
- Distinguished Flying Cross - 22 December 1918 "Pilot Officer Frank William Foster DSM (North Russia) In recognition of distinguished services rendered during the War and since the close of hostilities."
- General Service Medal, 2nd/Lt RAF 1918
- Victory Service Medal, 2nd/Lt RAF 1918
- India General Service Medal & Bar, F/O RAF 1930/31 (North West Frontier)
- Silver Jubilee Medal, 1935
- Coronation Medal, 1937
- War Medal & Mentioned in Despatches clasp, 1939/45
- Defence Medal, 1945
