= USS Boone =

1980 Oliver Hazard Perry-class frigate

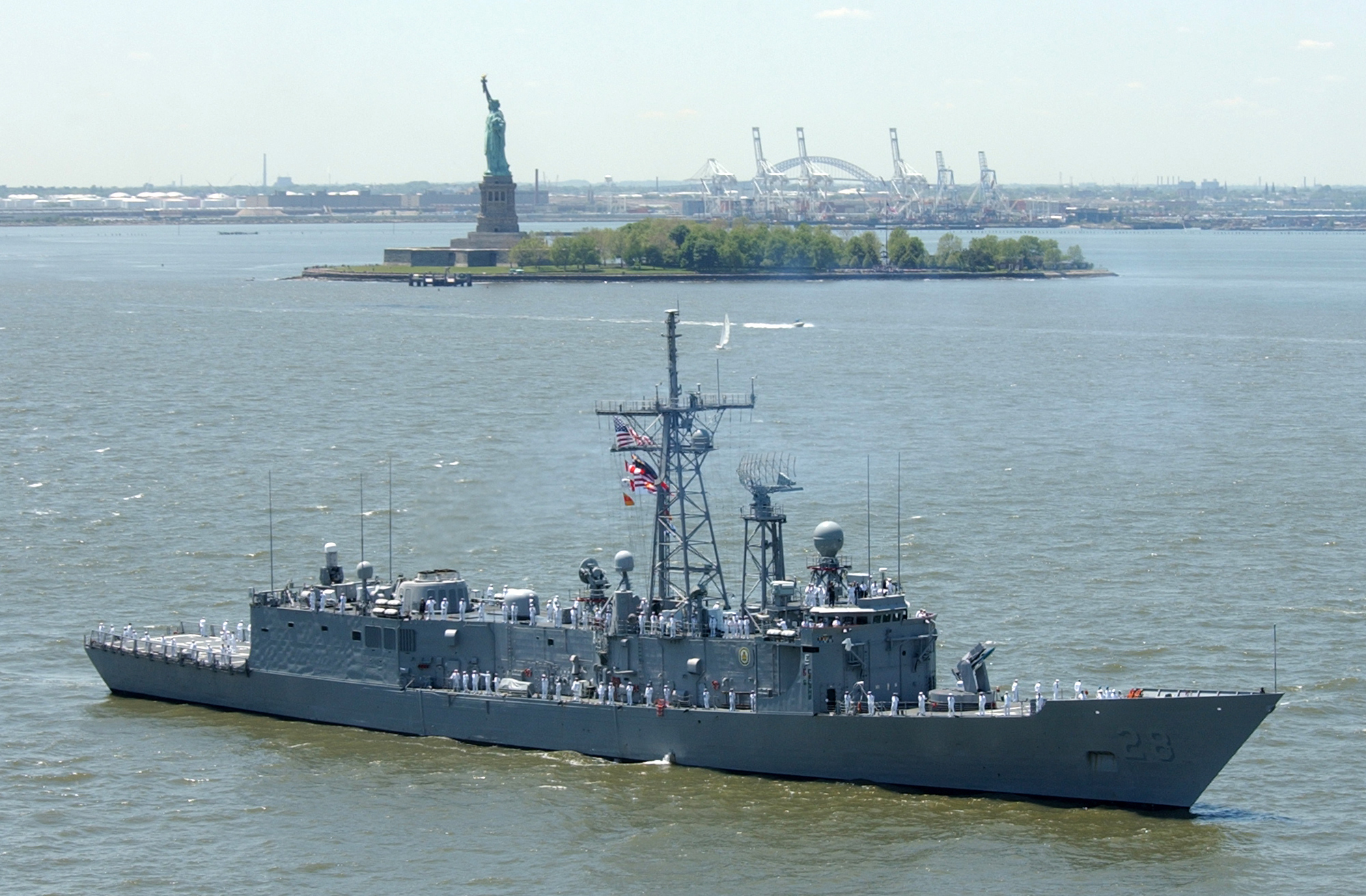
- USS Boone (FFG-28) passing the Statue of Liberty, Fleet Week, New York 2002

History

United States
- Name: Boone
- Namesake: Vice Admiral Joel Thompson Boone, M.D.
- Ordered: 23 January 1978
- Builder: Todd Pacific Shipyards, Seattle, Washington
- Laid down: 27 March 1979
- Launched: 16 January 1980
- Sponsored by: Mrs. Milton F. Heller, Jr., daughter of the late Vice Admiral Boone
- Commissioned: 15 May 1982
- Decommissioned: 23 February 2012
- Home port: Mayport Naval Station
- Identification: Hull symbol:FFG-28; Code letters:NBON; Call sign:Comanche Trail
- Motto: "Don't Tread on Me"
- Honors and awards: 2005 DESRON 14 Battle "E"
- Fate: Sunk as target, 7 September 2022
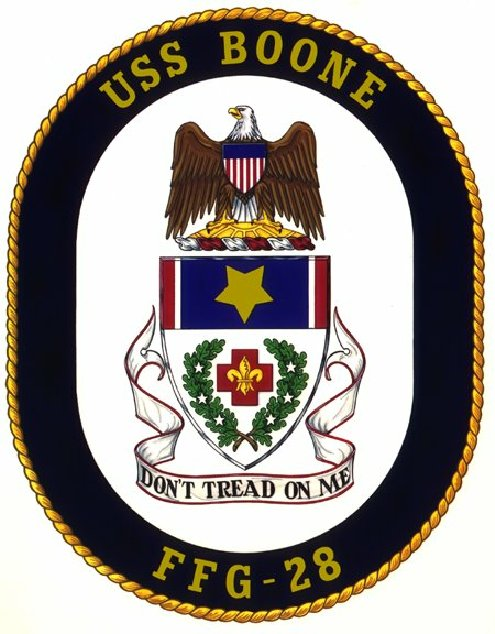
- Badge

General characteristics
- Class & type: Oliver Hazard Perry-class guided missile frigate
- Displacement: 4,100 long tons (4,200 t), full load
- Length: 453 feet (138 m), overall
- Beam: 45 feet (14 m)
- Draft: 22 feet (6.7 m)
- Propulsion: 2 × General Electric LM2500-30 gas turbines generating 41,000 shp (31 MW) through a single shaft and variable pitch propeller; 2 × Auxiliary Propulsion Units, 350 hp (260 kW) retractable electric azimuth thrusters for maneuvering and docking.
- Speed: over 29 knots (54 km/h)
- Range: 5,000 nautical miles at 18 knots (9,300 km at 33 km/h)
- Complement: 15 officers and 190 enlisted, plus SH-60 LAMPS detachment of roughly six officer pilots and 15 enlisted maintainers
- Sensors & processing systems: AN/SPS-49 air-search radar; AN/SPS-55 surface-search radar; CAS and STIR fire-control radar; AN/SQS-56 sonar.
- Electronic warfare & decoys: AN/SLQ-32
- Armament: As built: 1 × OTO Melara Mk 75 76 mm/62 caliber naval gun; 2 × Mk 32 triple-tube (324 mm) launchers for Mark 46 torpedoes; 1 × Vulcan Phalanx CIWS; 4 × .50-cal (12.7 mm) machine guns.; 1 × Mk 13 Mod 4 single-arm launcher for Harpoon anti-ship missiles and SM-1MR Standard anti-ship/air missiles (40 round magazine); Note: As of 2004, Mk 13 systems removed from all active US vessels of this class.
- Aircraft carried: 2 × SH-60 LAMPS III helicopters
- Aviation facilities: RAST

USS Boone (FFG-28) was the twentieth ship in the United States Navy's Oliver Hazard Perry-class of guided missile frigates.

The frigate was named for Vice Admiral Joel Thompson Boone, M.D. (1889–1974). FFG-28, the first U.S. ship to bear the admiral's name, was ordered 23 January 1978, launched 16 January 1980 by Todd Pacific Shipyards, and commissioned 15 May 1982. She earned numerous awards and commendations. She was sunk as target on 7 September 2022.

== History ==
On 30 November 2006, the rudder fell off Mayport-based frigate Boone while on deployment in the western Mediterranean. The mishap forced the ship to send out a call for help to which Canadian destroyer HMCS Iroquois responded, providing divers who inspected the ship's underside. Within 24 hours, Boone was being towed to Rota for repairs by the German Navy's replenishment oiler Spessart. The ship was not adrift or totally dead in the water because its two 350-horsepower auxiliary propulsion units provided a "limited amount of maneuverability." The lost rudder was replaced 27 December and, after a day of operational testing, Boone got underway again on 28 December.

Boone was assigned to Destroyer Squadron 14 and was the recipient of the 2005 DESRON 14 Battle "E". On 16 February 2007, she was awarded the 2006 Battle "E" award.

Boone was homeported in Mayport, Florida, and was a member of the Navy Reserve. In March 2010, she was assigned to the United States Fifth Fleet fighting Somali piracy.

Boone was decommissioned on 23 February 2012.

=== Sinking ===
On 18 August 2022, Boone was towed to Campbeltown, Scotland to be sunk as part of a SINKEX involving Harpoon missiles fired by the Royal Navy Type 23 frigate HMS Westminster, to test a new US targeting satellite. The SINKEX took place on 7 September 2022 with the participation of both US and UK forces. From the sea, she was struck by two Harpoon anti-ship missiles fired by HMS Westminster and an SM-6 from USS Arleigh Burke. Meanwhile, from the air, she was struck by two Paveway IV laser-guided bombs from Royal Air Force Typhoon fighters, two JDAMs from US Air Force F-15 Eagles, a Martlet missile from Westminster's Wildcat helicopter and a Harpoon anti-ship missile from a US Navy P-8 Poseidon.
