= No. 205 Squadron RAF =

Defunct flying squadron of the Royal Air Force

- No. 205 Squadron badge
- Active: Royal Naval Air Service; 2 August 1915 – October 1915; 31 December 1916 – 1 April 1918; Royal Air Force; 1 April 1918 – 22 January 1920; 15 April 1920 – 1 April 1923; 8 January 1929 – 31 March 1942; 23 July 1942 – 31 October 1971
- Country: United Kingdom
- Branch: Royal Air Force
- Type: Flying squadron
- Role: Maritime Reconnaissance
- Mottos: Malay: Pertama di Malaya ("First in Malaya")

Commanders
- Notable commanders: H M Cave-Browne-Cave

Insignia
- Squadron Badge heraldry: A kris and a trident in saltire The badge points to two aspects of the squadron's history, the trident referring to its RNAS origins and the kris to its association with Malaya
- Squadron Codes: KM (Apr 1939 – Sep 1939; Allocated, no confirmation of use); FV (Sep 1939 – Mar 1942)

No. 205 Squadron was a Royal Air Force unit formed on 1 April 1918. Prior to this it had existed as No. 5 Squadron of the Royal Naval Air Service (RNAS). In 1929, it became the first RAF squadron to be permanently based in Singapore, taking as its motto Pertama di Malaya ("First in Malaya"). No. 205 Squadron operated during the Second World War and the Cold War before disbanding on 31 October 1971.

== History ==
=== Formation and World War I ===
No. 5 Squadron of the Royal Naval Air Service was formed at Dover on 2 August 1915 from elements of No. 4 Squadron RNAS, which had relocated to Eastchurch. However, in October 1915, No. 5 Squadron ceased to exist as it was absorbed into RNAS Dover.

On 31 December 1916, 'B' Squadron of No. 5 (Naval) Wing was redesignated No. 5 (Naval) Squadron. It operated Sopwith 1½ Strutters, making bombing raids on Belgian ports and German airfields. In August 1917, the squadron was equipped with DH.4s. No. 5 (Naval) Squadron was attached to 5th Brigade of the Royal Flying Corps in February 1918. On 1 April 1918, at Bois de Roche, France (some sources say Petite-Synthe), it transferred to the Royal Air Force and was redesignated No. 205 Squadron RAF. No. 205 Squadron's operations continued with raids against ports and attacks on German airfields until the end of the war. In September 1918, it was re-equipped with DH.9As.

It produced at least three notable aces, in Euan Dickson, Charles Bartlett, and Walter Naylor.

=== Between the wars ===
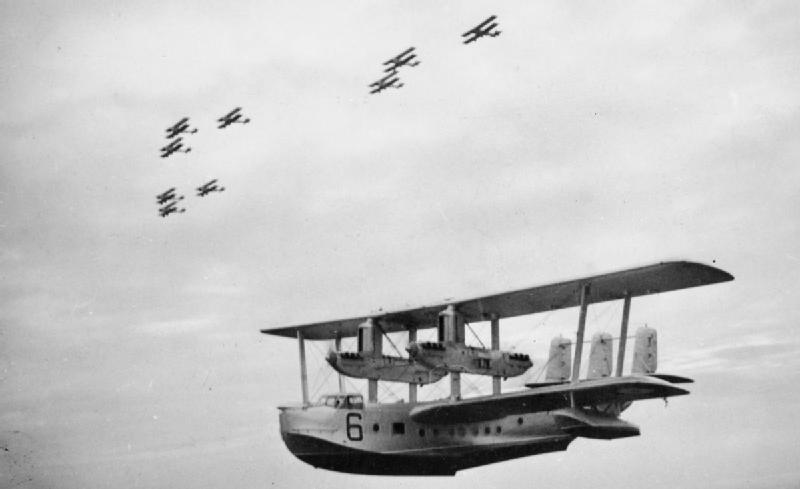
Short Singapore Mark III flying boat of No. 205 Squadron in flight below three 'vic' formations of Vickers Vildebeest torpedo bombers of No. 100 Squadron, both units based at RAF Seletar.

The squadron relocated to La Louveterie in Belgium following the end of hostilities before moving to Hucknall Airfield in March 1919, where it was first reduced to cadre status and disbanded on 22 January 1920.

Reformed at RAF Leuchars on 15 April 1920, the squadron operated as a fighter-reconnaissance unit with Parnall Panthers. It was disbanded on 1 April 1923, after being redesignated to No. 441 Flight. The squadron was reformed when the RAF's Far East Flight was redesignated No. 205 Squadron on 8 January 1929, becoming the Air Force's first squadron to be permanently based at Singapore. It carried out survey flights with Supermarine Southamptons, re-equipping with Short Singapores in April 1935. From 1929 to 1930, the squadron commander was Group Captain H M Cave-Browne-Cave. Cave-Browne-Cave had previously been Officer Commanding the Far East Flight.

=== World War II ===
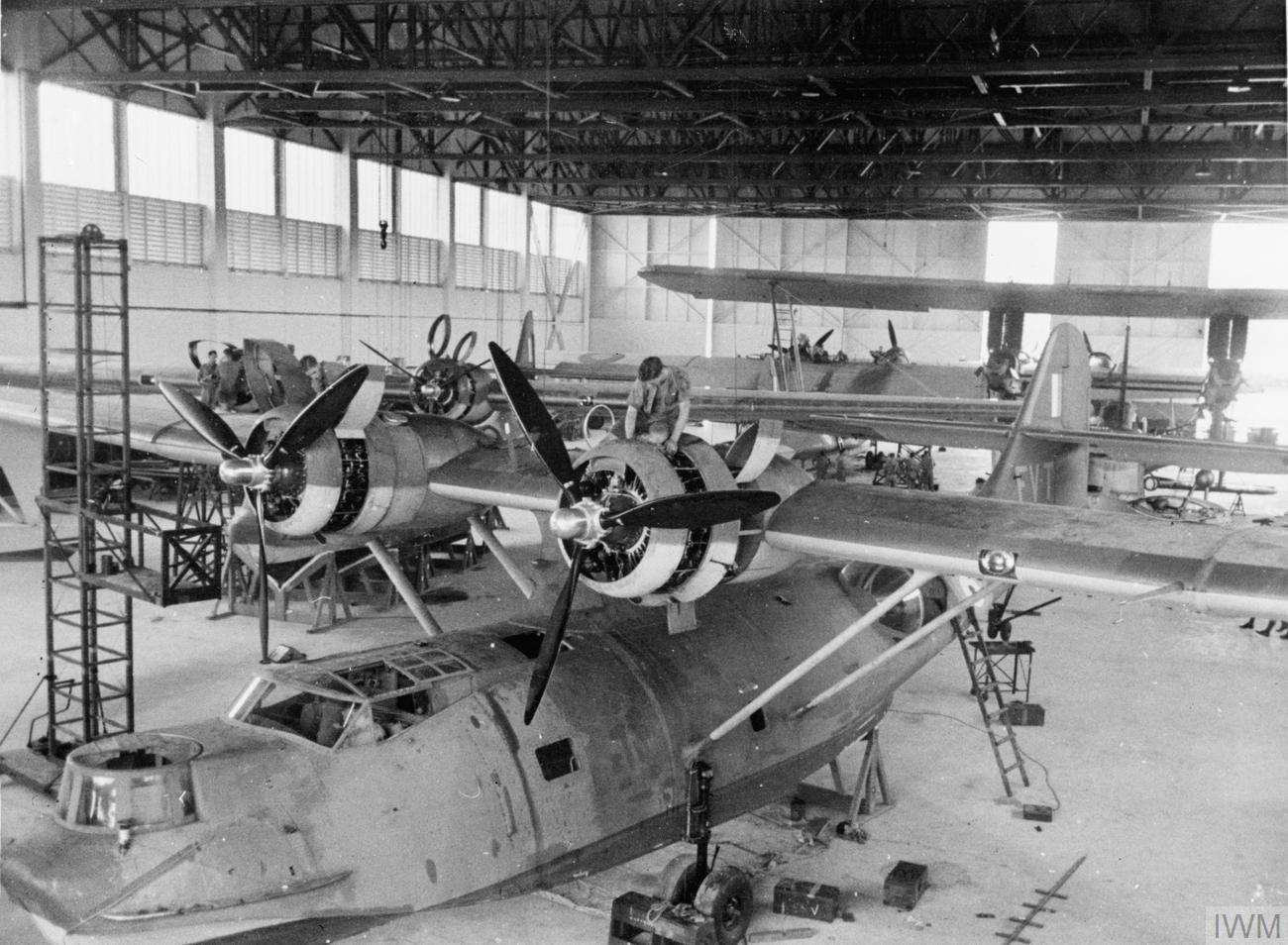
Consolidated Catalina Mark Is of No. 205 Squadron RAF undergoing servicing in their hangar at RAF Seletar, Singapore. One of the Squadron's Short Singapore Mark IIIs biplane flying boats can be seen in the right background.

At the outbreak of World War II, No. 205 Squadron flew patrols over the approaches to Singapore and the Indian Ocean, employing bases in Ceylon and the Nicobar Islands as outstations. It was re-equipped with PBY Catalinas in 1941 before being withdrawn from Singapore and relocated to Java, leaving three aircraft at Selatar Air Base. One of 205 Squadron's Catalinas became the first Allied casualties of the war with Japan. According to Japanese reports found after the war Flying Officer Edwin Beddell's Catalina had spotted the Japanese invasion fleet approaching Northern Malaya when he was attacked by a catapult-launched float plane which must have damaged his radio. A short time later Beddell's plane was attacked by five Ki-27 which shot him down. The Japanese report states the Catalina exploded 400 feet above the sea. When Japanese forces invaded Java the squadron retired to the south of the island and then to Australia, where it disbanded on 31 March 1942. Reformed in Ceylon on 23 July 1942, the squadron's Catalinas flew anti-submarine and air-sea rescue patrols out of Koggala for the remainder of the war.

=== Cold War ===
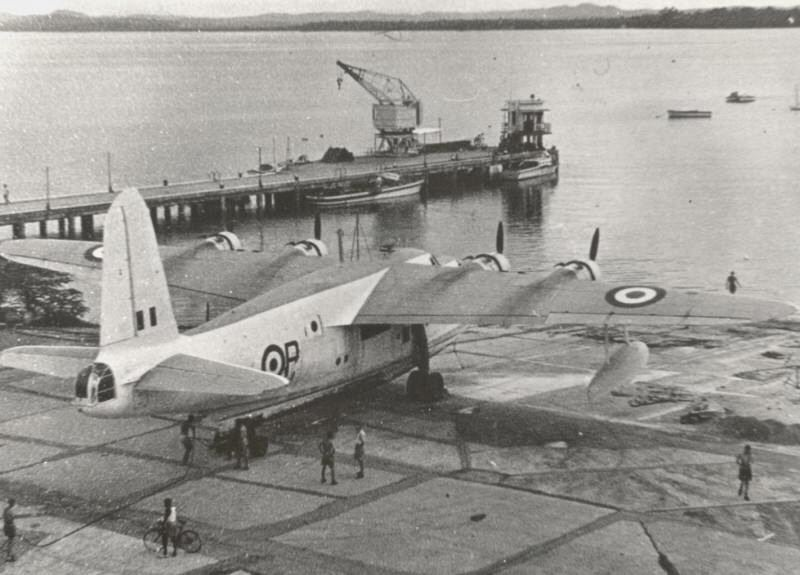
A No. 205 Squadron RAF Short Sunderland at the ramp of RAF Seletar, prior to being replaced by the Avro Shackleton.

No. 205 Squadron continued Catalina operations from its base at Koggala until 1949, when it was re-equipped with Sunderland Vs and returned to Seletar, Singapore. During 1950 and 1951, a detachment was based at Iwakuni in Japan, carrying out patrols along the Korean coast. Detachments were also based at RAF Trincomalee, RAF Kai Tak and RAF Changi. Squadron Headquarters was moved to Changi in March 1959, leaving a detachment of Sunderlands at Seletar. The unit then began converting to land-based maritime patrol operations, equipped with Avro Shackletons. On 15 May 1959 the squadron flew the RAF's last Sunderland operation out of RAF Seletar, Singapore. No. 205 Squadron continued Shackleton patrols until it disbanded on 31 October 1971.

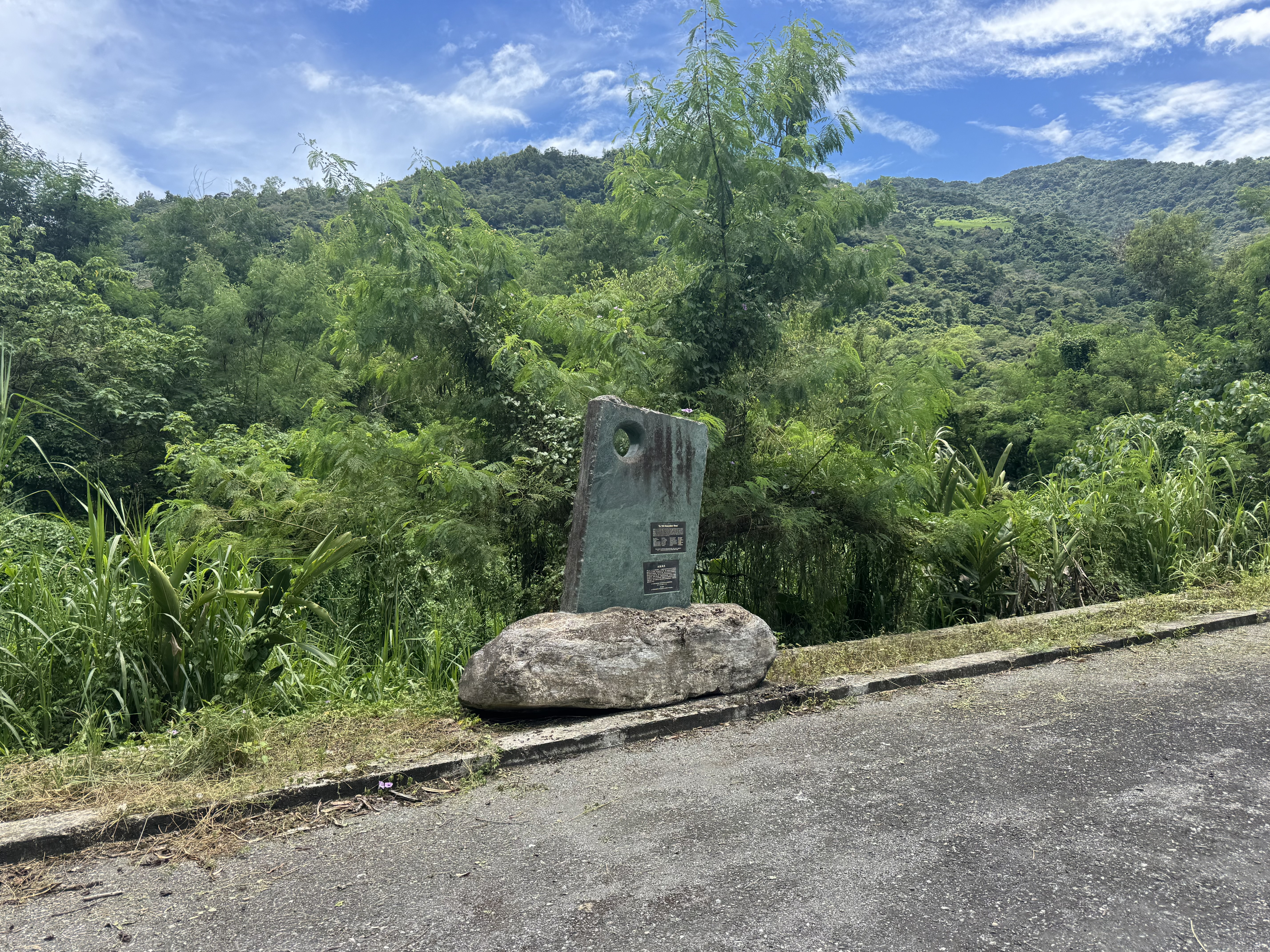
No. 205 Squadron RAF crash Memorial, Zhuoxi

== Aircraft operated ==
From	To	Aircraft	Variant
Dec 1916	Jul 1917	Sopwith 1½ Strutter	
Apr 1917	Sep 1918	Airco DH.4	
Aug 1918	Mar 1919	Airco DH.9A	
Apr 1920	Apr 1923	Parnall Panther	
Jan 1929	Feb 1936	Supermarine Southampton	Mks.II
Apr 1935	Oct 1941	Short Singapore	Mk.III
Apr 1941	Mar 1942	Consolidated Catalina	MK.I
Jul 1942	Mar 1945	Consolidated Catalina I	Mk.Ib
May 1944	Sep 1945	Consolidated Catalina	Mk.IVb
Jun 1945	May 1959	Short Sunderland	GR.5
May 1958	Nov 1962	Avro Shackleton	MR.1A
Apr 1962	Oct 1971	Avro Shackleton	MR.2C

== Notable personnel ==
Notable personnel who served with No. 205 Squadron include the following.

=== World War I ===
Included here are personnel who served with No. 5 Wing RNAS

- Robert Barbour
- Charles Bartlett
- Euan Dickson
- William Elliott
- John Gamom
- Stanley Goble
- William Grossart
- E. Grahame Joy
- Thomas Le Mesurier
- Charles Lupton
- William James Middleton
- Walter Naylor
- Ernest Norton
- Charles Robinson
- Reginald Soar
- Howard Saint

=== Inter-war period ===
- John Denis Breakey
- Colin Brown
- Grahame Donald
- Frank William Foster
- John Grigson
- Gerald Livock
- Leonard Slatter
- William Staton
- Alick Stevens

=== World War II ===
- Geoffrey Fisken
- Man Mohan Singh

=== Post-war period ===
- George Chesworth

== See also ==
- List of Royal Air Force aircraft squadrons
