= William Grossart =

Scottish World War I flying ace

- Born: 26 May 1896; Crawfordjohn, Lanarkshire, Scotland
- Died: Unknown; after July 1920
- Military career
- Allegiance: United Kingdom
- Branch: British Army; Royal Air Force
- Service years: 1917–1919
- Rank: Captain (acting)
- Unit: No. 205 Squadron RAF
- Awards: Distinguished Flying Cross

Captain William Grossart (26 May 1896 – unknown) was a Scottish World War I flying ace credited with five aerial victories.

== Biography ==
Grossart was born in Crawfordjohn, Lanarkshire, Scotland, the son of James and Elisabeth Grossart. Grossart joined the Royal Flying Corps (RFC) of the British Army in late 1917 as a cadet, being appointed a temporary second lieutenant (on probation) on 17 November, and was confirmed in his rank on 25 February 1918.

On 1 April, the RFC and the Royal Naval Air Service (RNAS) were merged to form the Royal Air Force (RAF), and Grossart was assigned to No. 205 Squadron RAF to fly the DH.4 two-seater day bomber.

On 3 May, Grossart shared credit with nine other aircraft of his squadron in the shooting down of two Pfalz D.IIIs over Chaulnes, France, and on 15 May he drove down another D.III in the same area. He gained another credit, shared with seven others, on 20 May, accounting for another D.III over Mericombe. Finally, on 11 August, he destroyed another D.III over Péronne. On 23 August, he was appointed a flight commander with the acting rank of captain.

Grossart's award of the Distinguished Flying Cross was gazetted on 20 September 1918. His citation read:

Lieutenant William Grossart.

During the last two and a half months this officer has carried out twenty-seven successful bombing raids and twenty-five special photographic reconnaissances, his services on the latter duty being exceptionally valuable. This officer possesses a fine spirit of determination; neither strong opposition nor adverse weather conditions deters him from achieving his object.

Grossart left the RAF after the war, being transferred to the unemployed list on 12 April 1919. He was reported to be present at an investiture, with many other honorees, held by King George V at Holyrood Palace in Scotland on 5 July 1920.
