= Charles François Lhomond =

French priest, grammarian, and educator

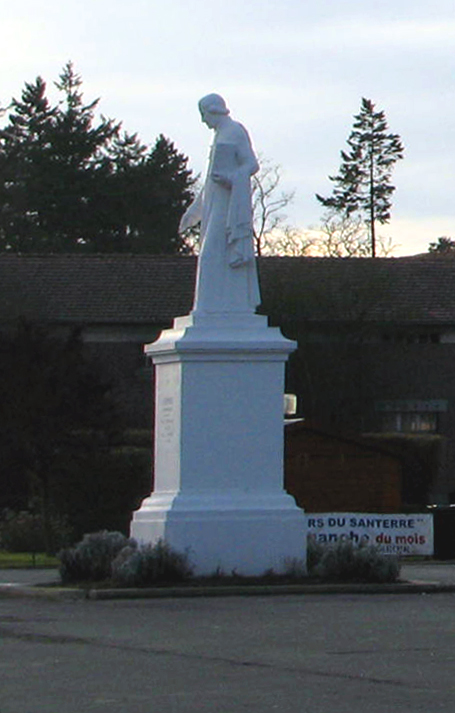
Statue of Charles François Lhomond in Chaulnes

Charles François Lhomond (French pronunciation: [lɔmɔ̃]; 1727 – December 31, 1794) was a French priest, grammarian, and educator who was a native of Chaulnes, Somme.

He attended classes at the Collège d'Inville in Paris, where he subsequently became dean of the school. Later on, he spent twenty years as an educator at the Collège du Cardinal-Lemoine in the Latin Quarter of Paris, and afterwards was professor emeritus at the University of Paris.

Lhomond made contributions in the field of education, being the author of several works on grammar, Roman history and religious history. His textbook from 1779, De viris illustribus urbis Romae a Romulo ad Augustum, was still used in the 20th century by French students learning Roman history and Latin.

Other works by Lhomond include:

- Élémens de la grammaire françoise (Basics of French Grammar, 1771)
- Élémens de la grammaire latine (Basics of Latin Grammar, 1779)
- Epitome historiæ sacræ (Summary of Sacred History, 1784)
- Histoire abrégée de l'Église (Abridged History of the Church)
- Histoire abrégée de la religion avant la venue de Jésus-Christ (Abridged History of Religion Prior to the Arrival of Jesus Christ)

In 1792 he was jailed for refusing to swear allegiance to the Civil Constitution of the Clergy, but was released shortly afterwards through intervention by Jean-Lambert Tallien (1767–1820), a former student of his at Collège du Cardinal-Lemoine. A statue of Lhomond by French sculptor Eugène-Louis Lequesne stands in his home town of Chaulnes.
