= Honour medal of Foreign Affairs =

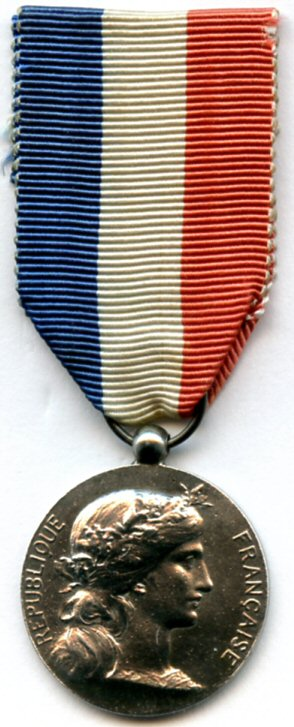
- Honour medal of Foreign Affairs, silver grade, type 1 (obverse)
- Type: Medal
- Country: France
- Presented by: the Ministry of Foreign Affairs
- Eligibility: French and foreign nationals
- Status: Currently awarded
- Established: Type 1 award 28 July 1816 – Type 2 award 30 August 2010

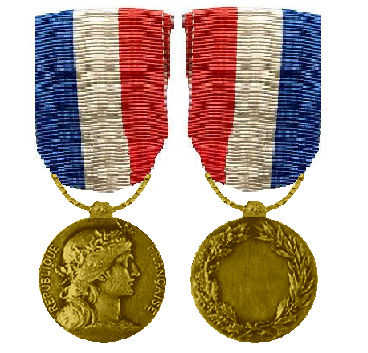
Type 1 Honour medal of Foreign Affairs for civilians, silver gilt grade, obverse and reverse

Known for a long time as the President's medal, the Honour medal of Foreign Affairs (French: "médaille d'honneur des affaires étrangères") is a state decoration bestowed by the French Republic in the form of an honour medal for work. It was originally created by a Royal decree of 28 July 1816 as a single grade medal to reward acts of courage displayed by French nationals on foreign soil. An 1861 Imperial decree saw it be split into the silver and gold grades. The year 1887 saw the addition of swords to the medal for award to both French or allied military personnel for acts of courage in favour of the French in time of war. Although still bestowed in wartime for courage, the modern award is now aimed at rewarding civil servants of the ministry for Foreign Affairs.

== Award statute ==
Currently, the Honour medal of Foreign Affairs is intended to reward honorable service by French diplomats and civil servants stationed outside of France. It can also be awarded to French nationals and foreigners for exceptional service to France or that have accomplished acts of courage in assistance to French nationals either in peace or wartime. Military awards are often bestowed on order of the French president, hence the common practice of calling it the President's medal. President Raymond Poincaré bestowed many such medals to French and foreign nationals during World War I.

The Honour medal of Foreign Affairs is currently divided into three grades, bronze, silver and gold. When awarded for service, the bronze grade is awarded for no less than 20 years of service, the silver grade may be awarded a minimum of eight years later, the gold grade, seven years after the silver.

The Honour medal of Foreign Affairs may be exceptionally awarded regardless of seniority and set quotas to reward bravery and dedication. It can be awarded, also regardless of seniority and set quotas, if the recipient was wounded or killed in the line of duty.

The wartime award with swords is bestowed as follows:

- In bronze to privates;
- In silver to non-commissioned officers;
- In gold (silver-gilt prior to 2010) to officers.

== Award description ==
The Honour medal of Foreign Affairs, a design of engraver Daniel Dupuis, is a 27mm in diameter circular medal in bronze, silver or gold. The obverse bears the relief effigy of the republic surrounded by the relief inscription "RÉPUBLIQUE FRANÇAISE" (English: "FRENCH REPUBLIC") along the left and right circumference. The reverse bears a crown of half laurel and half oak leaves with the relief inscription "AFFAIRES ÉTRANGÈRES" (English: "FOREIGN AFFAIRS") with a bare center destined to receive the recipient's name and year of award.

Medals with the dates "1897", "1902", "1908", and "1909" on the reverse were awarded to Russian military personnel.

The medal hangs from a silk moiré tricolour ribbon composed of three equal blue-white-red vertical stripes.

From 1887 to October 1917, the military-style medal was attached with two crossed swords, and from October 1917 to the present, the attachment appears as swords framed by a wreath.

== Partial recipients' list for acts of courage and devotion ==
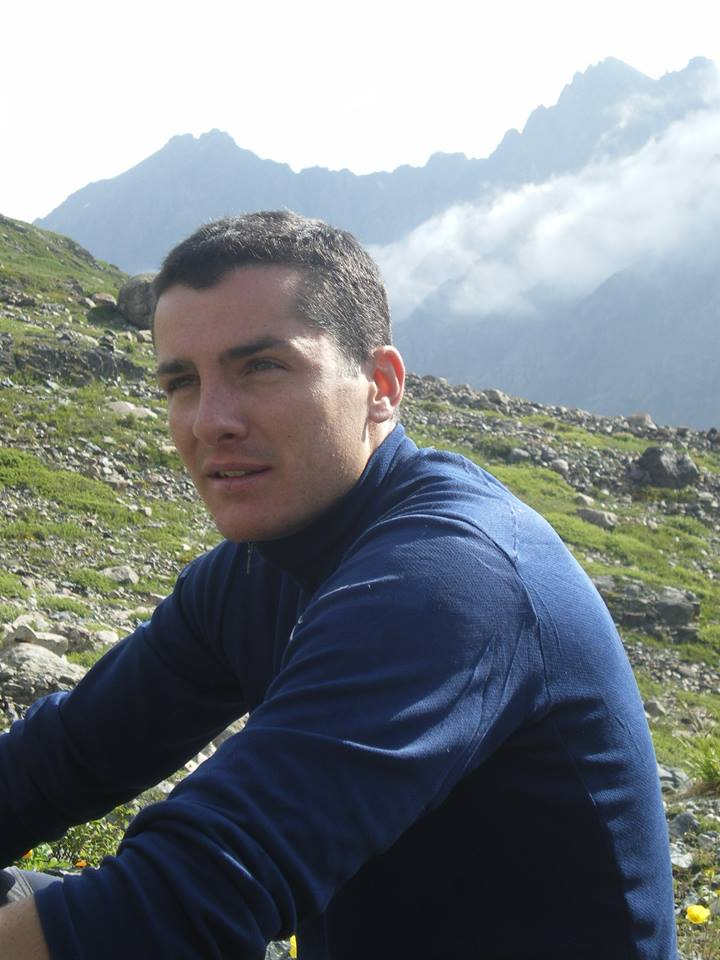
French writer Cédric Gras, a recipient of the Honour medal of Foreign Affairs for acts of courage and devotion

Gold grade:

- Mr Mohamed Salem ABDOU
- Mrs Isabelle DUMONT
- Mr. Alain REMY
- Mr Frédéric de TOUCHET

Silver grade:

- Mr Walter ARNAUD
- Mr Richard BEAUX
- Mr Philippe BERJONNEAU
- Mr Francky BLANDEAU
- Mrs Isabelle du BOIS de MEYRIGNAC
- Mr Vincent CORBEAU
- Mr Vincent FALCOZ
- Mr Jean-Marc FIORENTINI
- Mrs Julie FORT
- Mr François GARCIA
- Mrs Mathilde de GERMAIN
- Mr Cédric GRAS
- Mrs Sophie LAFITTE
- Mr Jérôme MALLARD
- Mr Guillaume NARJOLLET
- Mrs Agnès NKAKE
- Mr Pascal NOJAC
- Mrs Sylvie NOJAC
- Mr Gérard NOUBEL
- Mr Cédric PELTIER
- Mr Eric TOSATTI

Bronze grade:

- Mr Serge BESANGER
- Mr Thierry BINOIST
- Mrs Marie-Amélie DELAROCHE
- Mrs Annick DORIS
- Mrs Françoise DUBREUIL-KRIKORIAN
- Mr Emmanuel FABRY
- Mr Daniel FARBAT
- Mr Jorge FERNANDEZ
- Mr Pascal GEHANT
- Mr Thierry MAIRE
- Mrs Claire MALANDAIN
- Mr Yann MILLET
- Mr Frédéric PECH
- Mr Marc RASTOLL
- Mrs Corinne SIDIBE
- Mrs Martine THEMIN
- Mr Jean-Christophe THIABAUD

== Partial recipients' list for service to civil servants ==
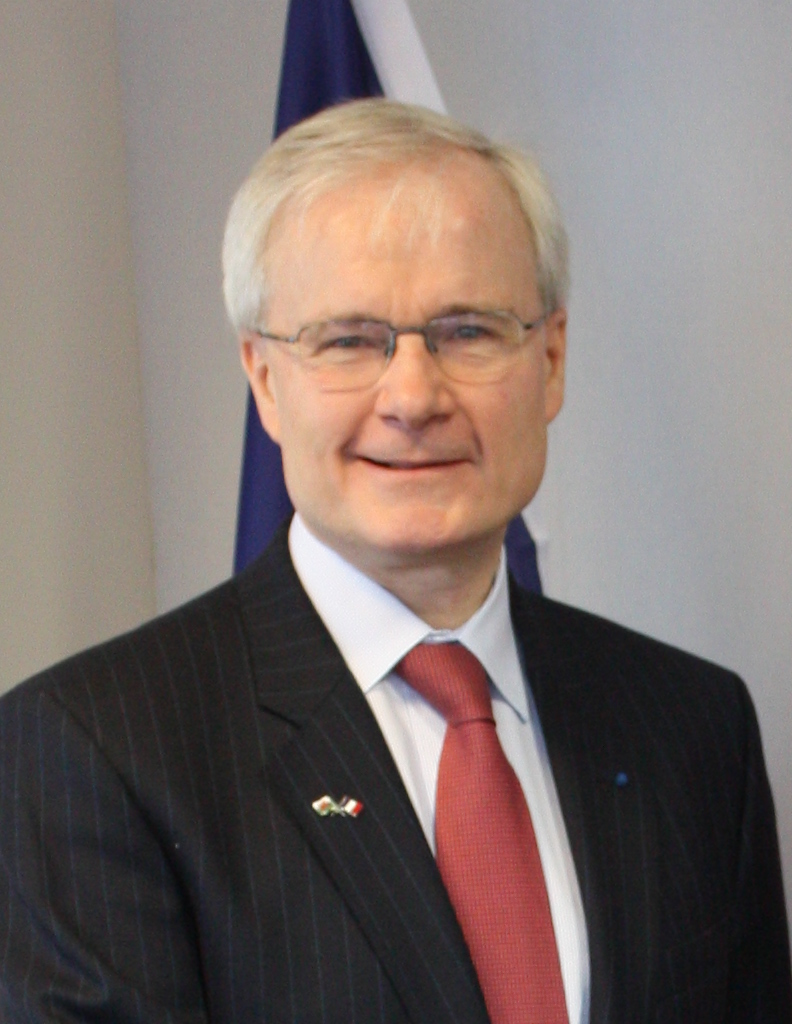
French diplomat Bernard Emié, a recipient of the Honour medal of Foreign Affairs for service to civil servants

Gold grade:

- Mr Arnaud BALNER
- Mrs Mathilde de CALAN
- Mrs Christine FAGES
- Mrs Leslie GOLDLUST
- Mrs Catherine HYVER
- Mr Bertrand LE ROUX
- Mr Alain RICHEZ
- Mr Christophe SCHMITT
- Mr Mounir SLIMANI
- Mr Clément TARON-BROCARD
- Mr Guillaume VELUT

Silver grade:

- Mr Nicolas BARNAUD
- Mr Rémi COTTIN
- Mrs Pauline DELAPORTE
- Mr Rémi DROUIN
- Mr Julien MARIANI
- Mr Jean-Baptiste POHL
- Mr Odoric PORCHER
- Mrs Candice VERLOT

Bronze grade:

- Mrs Marie Noelle LANDAZURI
- Mr Smaïl CHAOUI
- Mr Dimitri DEMIANENKO
- Mr Guillaume GRELAUD
- Mr Fabrice GROSSIR
- Mr Rodolphe MONNET
- Mr Guillaume PEGHAIRE
- Mr Mickaël PITHON
- Mr Arnaud ROLLAND
- Mr Gwenn VALLEE
- Mr Philippe VUYLSTEKE

== Partial recipients' list to foreign military personnel ==
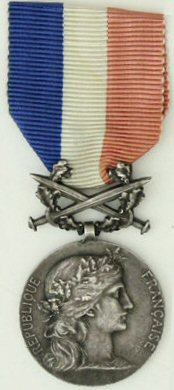
1917 design wartime award

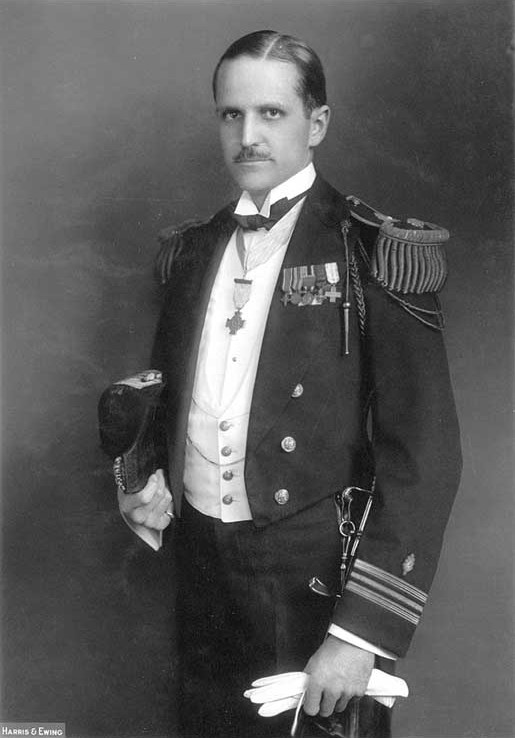
United States Navy Vice Admiral Joel T. Boone, a recipient of the Honour medal of Foreign Affairs for acts of courage and devotion to military personnel

In October 1917, the design of the crossed swords on two sprays of oak leaves changed. The medal ranked after the Croix de Guerre and several were awarded to service members of Allied forces, including personnel from:

United Kingdom (partial list)

Driver George Lang Gordon Royal Field Artillery Bronze grade with swords date awarded unknown

- Lance Corporal (Acting Sergeant) John Henry Cory (mounted Military Police). Bronze grade with swords awarded 14 July 1919.
- Sergeant-Observer William James Middleton, Royal Air Force. Silver grade with swords awarded 22 August 1919.
- Private Albert Weickers. Bronze grade with swords awarded 22 August 1919.
- Air Mechanic 1st Class Clarence Harold Cobden, Royal Air Force. Bronze grade with swords awarded 22 August 1919.
- Cpl Herbert Reginald Verrall GS/2779, Queen's Own (Royal West Kent) Regiment (8th Bn). Bronze grade with swords awarded 21 November 1918

United States (partial list)

- Vice Admiral Joel T. Boone, USN. Gold grade.
- Arley Munson Hare

Australia (7 Gold, 26 Silver, 16 Bronze)

- A. A. Shambler, bronze with swords
- Corporal (Later Brigadier) Lionel H. Lemaire, Silver-Gilt grade with swords for actions in the Battle of the Somme

New Zealand (2 Gold, 4 Silver, 6 Bronze)
Newfoundland

- Sgt Ernest Gullicksen, Royal Newfoundland Regiment, Bronze with swords for actions during the German Spring Offensive of 1918.

Canada (partial list)

- Lieutenant Joseph-Hector-Ernest Allen, 22nd battalion CEF, Silver-gilt grade with swords awarded 15 April 1915
- Lieutenant-colonel Hugues-Lemoyne De Martigny, 22nd battalion CEF, Silver-gilt grade with swords awarded 27 October 1914
- Private Alphonse Marcotte, 22nd battalion CEF, Silver grade with swords awarded 15 June 1915
- Private Raoul Ouimet, 22nd battalion CEF, Silver grade with swords awarded 2 July 1915
- Private Georges Marcoux, 22nd battalion CEF, Bronze grade with swords awarded 13 January 1917

India (partial list)

- Risaldar-major Thakur Mul Singh, 26th King George's Own Light Cavalry, Silver-gilt grade with swords
- Subedar-major Chandrapal Singh, 7th (Duke of Connaught's Own) Rajputs, Silver-gilt grade with swords
- Acting Lance naik Mohamed Shaffi Khan, 32nd Lancers, Bronze grade with swords
- Sepoy Fazal Hussain, 46th Punjabis, Bronze grade with swords
- Havildar Appaya Kumbi, 101st Grenadiers, Bronze grade with swords

== See also ==
- Ministry of Foreign Affairs and International Development (France)
- Médaille d’honneur des Affaires étrangères France
