= Walter Naylor =

- Born: 28 October 1891; Newbury, Berkshire
- Military career
- Allegiance: United Kingdom
- Branch: Royal Naval Air Service (1914–18); Royal Air Force (1918–20)
- Service years: 1914–1920
- Rank: Sergeant
- Unit: No. 5 Squadron RNAS
- Conflicts: First World War
- Awards: Distinguished Service Medal & Bar

Walter Naylor, DSM & Bar (born 28 October 1891) was the leading observer ace of the Royal Naval Air Service, with 14 accredited victories. He flew as an enlisted observer/gunner in Airco DH.4 bombers in No. 5 Naval Squadron along the English Channel.

== First World War ==
Naylor scored his first aerial victory on 21 October 1917 as he and his pilot, Flight Lieutenant A. Shaw, drove down a German Albatros D.V out of control over Houttave Airfield. On 4 November, again using DH.4 serial number N6008, they drove down another Albatross D.V over Engel Airfield. On 18 December 1917, he was teamed with Flight Commander C. D. Sproat; using DH.4 number N6001, they set an Albatros D.V aflame in flight and drove another down out of control over Engel Airfield. The following day, Naylor manned the guns in the rear seat for Flight Commander Charles Bartlett; they destroyed an Albatros D.V offshore of Ostend, and Naylor was an ace.

Naylor began 1918 with a couple of out of control wins over Albatros D.Vs scored in company with Flight Lieutenant Euan Dickson, on 30 January and 17 February. Naylor was then teamed with Bartlett for the rest of Naylor's wins; Bartlett scored seven of his eight victories with Naylor as observer/gunner. Over Raincourt at 1000 hours on 28 March 1918, the two British aces capped their careers by destroying two Fokker Dr.I triplane fighters, as well as a Pfalz D.III fighter.

For his exploits, Walter Naylor was awarded the Distinguished Service Medal on 17 April 1918, after flying over 20 bombing sorties. He was honoured with a Bar to the award in June 1918. By war's end he was credited with at least 91 bombing sorties.
