= Joel Thompson Boone =

US Navy admiral and Medal of Honor recipient (1889–1974)

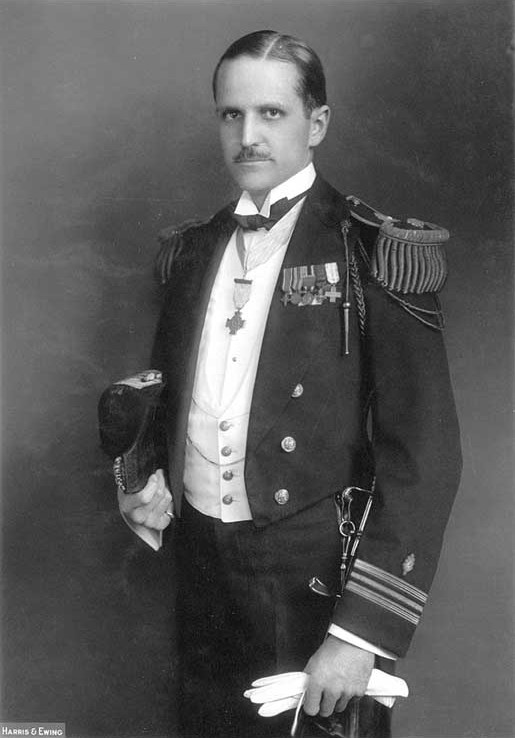
- Boone c. 1918

Physician to the President
- In office 1929–1933
- President: Herbert Hoover
- Preceded by: James Francis Coupal
- Succeeded by: Ross T. McIntire

Personal details
- Born: August 29, 1889 St. Clair, Pennsylvania, U.S.
- Died: April 2, 1974 (aged 84) Washington, D.C., U.S.
- Resting place: Arlington National Cemetery

Military service
- Allegiance: United States
- Branch/service: United States Navy
- Years of service: 1914–1950
- Rank: Vice admiral
- Battles/wars: Banana Wars; Battle of Fort Rivière; World War I; Battle of Soissons; World War II; Korean War
- Awards: Medal of Honor; Distinguished Service Cross; Silver Star (6); Bronze Star; Purple Heart (3)

Joel Thompson Boone (August 29, 1889 – April 2, 1974) was a United States Navy officer who received the Medal of Honor for his actions during World War I.

In addition to the Medal of Honor, Boone received the Army's Distinguished Service Cross and was awarded the Silver Star six times. These awards made Boone the most highly decorated medical officer in the history of the United States armed services.

== Early life ==
Boone was born in St. Clair, Pennsylvania, on August 29, 1889. He was a cousin several times removed to Daniel Boone. He attended Mercersburg Academy and graduated in June 1913 from Hahnemann Medical College in Philadelphia. The following year he was commissioned a lieutenant (junior grade) in the United States Naval Reserve.

== Haiti ==
After attending the U.S. Naval Medical School in Washington, D.C., in the summer of 1915, he was commissioned in the Regular Navy and assigned to Marine artillery battalion of the Marine Expeditionary Force in Haiti until 1916. In 1915, Lieutenant (junior grade) Boone participated in the Battle of Fort Rivière as the medical officer of the 13th Marine Company, under the command of Captain Chandler Campbell. Boone, armed with his sidearm, led a party of six Marines into the fort, and by his own account, beat Major Smedley Butler's force as the first Americans inside.

== First World War ==
When the United States declared war on Germany in April 1917, Boone was transferred to the battleship USS Wyoming and was promoted to lieutenant in June of the same year. He later served as a surgeon with the 6th Marine Regiment, which was part of the Army's 2nd Division while it was part of the American Expeditionary Force in France. On July 19, 1918, during the Battle of Soissons, he displayed extraordinary heroism while treating casualties under fire. For this action he was later awarded the Medal of Honor.

He was promoted to lieutenant commander in September 1918.

== Post First World War service ==
Boone remained in the Navy after the First World War and also served during the Second World War and the Korean War. He was one of the few individuals to have served in all three conflicts.

After returning from France he was assigned to serve as the director of the Bureau of Naval Affairs at the headquarters of the American Red Cross in Washington, D.C. In June 1922 he was assigned to the Presidential yacht USS Mayflower and served in that capacity during the administrations of Warren Harding and Calvin Coolidge.

When President Herbert Hoover took office in March 1929, Boone was assigned as the physician to the White House. He invented a game called Hooverball to help President Hoover keep in shape. He continued in the position when Franklin Roosevelt took office in 1933. He was promoted to commander in September 1931 and to captain in July 1939.

In late 1940, Captain Boone became the senior medical officer at Naval Air Station San Diego and later transferred to the Naval Hospital in Seattle, as medical officer-in-command.

In April 1945, Boone was promoted to commodore and ordered as Fleet Medical Officer to the commander of the Third Fleet, Admiral William F. Halsey. For his service in the Pacific Theater, Boone was awarded the Bronze Star Medal, the Navy Commendation Ribbon and two battle stars.

He was promoted to the rank of rear admiral on January 8, 1946, and was reassigned as District Medical Officer, Eleventh Naval District at San Diego.

In March 1950, he became the Inspector General of the Navy Medical Department. He went to Korea in 1950 – shortly before his retirement for physical disability in December 1950.

Upon his retirement from the Navy, Boone was promoted to the rank of vice admiral on the retired list in recognition of his distinguished career, and was appointed to serve as medical director of the United States Department for Veterans Affairs.

== Death and burial ==
Vice Admiral Boone died April 2, 1974, in Washington, D.C., and was buried at Arlington National Cemetery, in Arlington, Virginia. His wife Helen Elizabeth (1889–1977) is buried with him.

== Awards and decorations ==

Medal of Honor		Distinguished Service Cross
Silver Star with silver oak leaf cluster	Bronze Star Medal with "V" device	Purple Heart with two bronze oak leaf clusters
Navy and Marine Corps Commendation Medal	Marine Corps Expeditionary Medal	Haitian Campaign Medal
World War I Victory Medal with silver battle clasp	Army of Occupation of Germany Medal	American Defense Service Medal with bronze service star
American Campaign Medal	Asiatic-Pacific Campaign Medal with two bronze campaign stars	World War II Victory Medal
Navy Occupation Service Medal with 'Japan' clasp	National Defense Service Medal	Korean Service Medal
French Legion of Honor degree of Officer	Croix de Guerre, 1914–18 with two bronze Palm devices	Médaille d'honneur des affaires étrangères pour courage et dévouement (Gold grade)
Italian War Merit Cross	Republic of Korea Presidential Unit Citation	United Nations Korea Medal

=== Medal of Honor citation ===
Rank and organization: Lieutenant (Medical Corps), U.S. Navy. Place and date: Vicinity Vierzy, France, 19 July 1918. Entered service at: St. Clair, Pa. Born: 2 August 1889, St. Clair, Pa.

Citation:

For extraordinary heroism, conspicuous gallantry, and intrepidity while serving with the 6th Regiment, U.S. Marines, in actual conflict with the enemy. With absolute disregard for personal safety, ever conscious and mindful of the suffering fallen, Surg. Boone, leaving the shelter of a ravine, went forward onto the open field where there was no protection and despite the extreme enemy fire of all calibers, through a heavy mist of gas, applied dressings and first aid to wounded marines. This occurred southeast of Vierzy, near the cemetery, and on the road south from that town. When the dressings and supplies had been exhausted, he went through a heavy barrage of large-caliber shells, both high explosive and gas, to replenish these supplies, returning quickly with a sidecar load, and administered them in saving the lives of the wounded. A second trip, under the same conditions and for the same purpose, was made by Surg. Boone later that day.

=== Distinguished Service Cross ===
Citation:

The Distinguished Service Cross is presented to Joel Thompson Boone, Lieutenant (Medical Corps), U.S. Navy, for extraordinary heroism in action in the Bois-de-Belleau, France, June 9–10 and 25, 1918. On two successive days the regimental aid station in which he was working was struck by heavy shells and in each case demolished. Ten men were killed and a number of wounded were badly hurt by falling timbers and stone. Under these harassing conditions this officer continued without cessation his treatment of the wounded, superintending their evacuation, and setting an inspiring example of heroism to the officers and men serving under him. On June 25, 1918, Surgeon Boone followed the attack by one battalion against enemy machine-gun positions in the Bois-de-Belleau, establishing advanced dressing stations under continuous shell fire. General Orders No. No. 137, W.D., 1918

=== Honors ===
The USS Boone is the twentieth ship in the United States Navy's Oliver Hazard Perry class of guided missile frigates and is the only ship to bear Boone's name. The ship was ordered January 23, 1978, launched 16 January 1980 by Todd Pacific Shipyards, and commissioned 15 May 1982.

The Vice Admiral Joel T. Boone Health Care Treatment Facility on Joint Expeditionary Base Little Creek-Fort Story – CNIC is also named in his honor.

== Dates of rank ==
Ensign	Lieutenant (junior grade)	Assistant Surgeon	Passed Assistant Surgeon (temporary)	Medical Inspector	Medical Director
O-1	O-2	O-3	O-4	O-5	O-6
Never held	1914	22 April 1915	21 September 1918	1 September 1931	1 July 1939

Commodore (temporary)	Rear Admiral	Vice Admiral (retired)
O-7	O-8	O-9
3 April 1945	8 Jan 1946	31 Dec 1950

== See also ==
- List of Medal of Honor recipients
- List of Medal of Honor recipients for World War I
