= Arley Munson Hare =

- Dr. Munson in her World War I uniform from ca. 1918
- Born: Arley Isabel Munson; November 14, 1871; Bridgeport, Connecticut, U.S.
- Died: c. 1941 (aged 69 or 70)
- Occupations: Physician, surgeon, author, lecturer
- Known for: Medical mission work
- Spouse: James Alexander Hare (m. 1924)

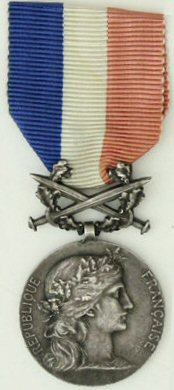
French Honour medal of Foreign Affairs for acts of courage and devotion (1917)

Arley Isabel Hare (née Munson; November 14, 1871 – c. 1941) was an American physician, surgeon, author, and lecturer. As a young woman in the early 20th century, Munson was a pioneer in the field of medical mission work with the Wesleyan Methodist Mission in Medak, Andhra Pradesh, India. Along with evangelical motives, Munson had a special interest in the state of the health of Indian women and children and in the treatment of epidemics such as cholera or tuberculosis.

She served in France during World War I, directing laboratories, clinics, and dispensaries. The French Government awarded her with the Medaille d’Honneur des Affaires Étrangères pour actes de courage et dévouement au personnel militaire étranger for her medical service. She married at the age of 52 and worked well into her seventies. She died in or around 1941 and is buried in Connecticut.

== Background and education ==
=== Early life and family ===
Arley Isabel Munson was born on November 14, 1871, in Bridgeport, Connecticut, to Thomas Hamilton Munson and Mary Etta Hill Munson. She was one of five siblings, including Burton, George, Gertrude, Alexander, and Mary. Each sibling had a career of his or her own, with Alexander working at Liberty National Bank and Mary as prominent teacher and lawyer in Red Bank, New Jersey.

The family attended a Protestant Episcopal Church and instilled strong religious values in their children.

Munson had descendants from the Revolutionary War and prominent English and Dutch settlers on both her paternal and maternal sides.

=== Higher-level education ===
Munson attended Cornell University from 1899 to 1901 for her undergraduate education. She attended the Women's Medical College of Pennsylvania, (now Drexel University College of Medicine) and graduated with her medical degree in 1902. Drexel Professor Steven J. Peitzman includes her as one of the "Golden Age" graduates of the Women's Medical College because of her enterprising medical mission work at the turn of the century.

== Medical missionary work in India ==
=== The missionary journey ===
Munson had aspirations to work abroad as a doctor since childhood. She was determined to follow her firmly established evangelical principles in her work, even refusing a government post abroad because of the restrictions against teaching Christianity. Having studied at Women's Medical College with an Indian Brahmin Christian, whom she referred to as “Mrs. Karmarkar,” Munson developed a particular interest in the needs of women and children in India. Following her graduation from medical school, she moved to India to find work while staying with Mrs. Karmarkar in Bombay in 1903, which at the time was ruled under the British Raj.

=== Medical service in India ===
Shortly after arriving in India, Munson found her first medical mission work with Brahmin Christians, Dr. Prabhakar Balaji Keskar and his wife, at a Christian and Missionary Alliance dispensary in Solapur. While she occasionally visited Leper Asylums and “relief tents” in and around Solapur, her primary focus was on the severe plague outbreak affecting the mission's orphanage.

Munson relocated to Medak, Andhra Pradesh when she received urgent requests for a doctor at a British Wesleyan Methodist Mission after the abrupt departure of the incumbent physician, Dr. Watts. Established in 1887, the Medak Mission was placed on elevated ground (as customary for many mission sites). The gated community included a school, hospital, and a Zenana women's ward. The mission was home to the revered Medak Cathedral, a diocese of the Church of South India, which still exists today. Although Reverend Charles Walker Posnett led the Mission, the land remained under control of the Hyderabadi Nizam, or Muslim monarch. Munson describes the town as consisting of a field, or maidan, mud huts and bazaars, though she and the other missionaries lived in “large and comfortable bungalows” within the gated community.

Munson was appointed the superintendent of the Zenana or women's hospital in the Medak Mission where she worked with the Mission's Indian nurses and chief compounder and “Bible-woman” known as “Abbhishakamma.” Munson treated a variety of pathologies like rheumatism, malaria, boils, elephantiasis and wounds from local wild animals, to injuries sustained from local cultural practices including maternal health issues of child-brides, domestic violence and unintentional maltreatment by Hakims, or local doctors. Munson noted that being the only physician within 500 square miles, patients would travel from afar for the Mission's effective medical care.

=== Travels throughout India ===
Aside from her daily Telugu lessons from a local shastri, Munson enjoyed a mostly European lifestyle during her stay in India, living in Western styled bungalows and suites within the gated Mission. She and the other missionaries enjoyed regular jaunts in carriages or trains to cities throughout India. Her travels included Agra, Mussoorie, Simla, Hoshiapur, Yellareddipett, Papannapet, Tandur, Kashmir, Lahore, Rawalpindi, Khyber Pass, Amritsar, Lucknow, Kanpur, and Secunderabad. While these outings were primarily for enjoyment, the missionaries would sometimes receive permission from local patels, or headmen, to set up tents in villages and treat the ill. On these occasions, the Medak Indian nurses and the chaprassi, or messenger, would accompany the missionaries.

=== Hardships during missionary work ===
Munson encountered several cultural and ethical hardships during her missionary work in India. First, came the disapproval of the Wesleyan Methodist Mission's objectives of evangelism. Though there was not much backlash from local Hindu and Muslim leaders, critics from abroad would publicly label the Medak converts as rice Christians, or Christians who convert for pragmatic benefits rather than for devotional reasons. Munson conceded that while many initially converted for material benefits, the Indian Christians were fully devout after numerous spiritual experiences. The missionaries would express disdain for the local Hindu and "Mohamedans" whose practices they found "repulsive".

Munson also struggled with discomfort regarding societal ways of thinking and local cultural practices. During this time, the Women's Suffragist Movement was underway in the United States. As an independent American woman, Munson strongly supported the undertaking and was disappointed that Indian women were not as concerned about women's rights issues as she felt herself to be. Disturbed by the prevalent cases of domestic violence, Munson discussed what she believed to be the inherent male chauvinism among the Indians: "Masculine supremacy runs rife through the veins of even the infant man-child." She cited several ancient proverbs that promote these attitudes including, "He is a fool who considers his wife as his friend", and "Educating a woman is like putting a knife into the hands of a monkey." Munson also blamed the women for being "childlike", and asserted that their lack of education causes "the complete ignorance of the Indian woman [that] enslaves her to the men of her family."

The issues of polygamy, child marriage, maternal mortality, and female feticide are also central to her hardships abroad. In one case, a ten-year-old patient visited the clinic after her 40-year-old husband prematurely consummated the marriage, thus severely injuring the child. After performing the necessary surgery to restore the child's health, Munson felt compelled to scold the husband and expressed her desire to "shout aloud to all the women of the happy Western world to help me crush the evil system responsible for the soul-sickening condition of the little patient before me."

An additional major struggle was the contention between local hakims, or doctors who use herbal remedies, and the Western physicians. Munson posited that one reason for existing tensions between local practitioners was due to "religious and professional jealousy". She suspected that the hakims would start rumors to stir mistrust among the Indians, including one rumor that the Westerners were trying to poison their patients as a sacrifice for the hospital's good fortune. The uncertainty led to the Indians' preference for hakims who would sometimes cause unintentional and adverse medical consequences. When one hakim's work had caused a young boy's intestines harm, Munson gave the patient brandy to alleviate the pain. However, the alcohol quickened the illness and the boy promptly died. The villagers vowed to avenge his death and kill Munson. She was able to escape with the help of the "chapprassis" (messengers). The heavy monsoons of the region and the flooding of the central Osmania General Hospital, added to the struggles of Munson while in India by causing an overwhelming influx of patients, many suffering from cholera. Many patients in desperation were influenced by the evangelism of the Mission and converted to Christianity.

== Returning from missionary service ==
Munson ended her work in India with a trip down the coast of South India in December 1908.

Munson recounted her experiences in her autobiographical book, Jungle Days, being the experiences of an American woman doctor in India, published by D. Appelton and Company in 1913. Having created an emotional tie with the country, Munson ended her book with a statement that expresses the motivation behind her medical missionary work:

Good-bye, my India! Though I may never see again your burning plains, your snow-crowned hills, your sun-kissed children, my heart will always hold you dear, for you have given me the greatest blessing of earth or heaven — peace!

In 1915, Doubleday, Page & Co. published Munson's second book about her travels throughout India entitled Kipling's India. The book's title and content, with many references to the English writer Rudyard Kipling, indicate her profound admiration for the author. Munson's book documented the similarities between her experiences in India and those of the characters in Kipling's novels. In addition, the title of her first book, Jungle Days, resembles the title of Kipling's famous work The Jungle Book.

== Career after Indian missionary service ==
Munson returned to the United States in 1908, where her career path took a more erratic trajectory, with frequent relocations and several switches to different specialities. Initially, she continued to promote her work abroad, lecturing at universities and conferences about her medical and religious work in the United States and England. Munson then briefly worked in the Women's Department at the Southern Indiana Hospital for the Insane in Evansville, Indiana. Following this position, she worked as the assistant superintendent at the State Home for the Feeble-Minded Women at Vineland, New Jersey. She left this work to become the director and instructor in the Serology Department at the Post-Graduate Medical School and Hospital in New York City. Following this position, in 1914, Munson started a private practice in gynecology and orthopedics in Red Bank, New Jersey, where she lived with her sister and brother-in-law, Mary and William Sutton.

=== Medical work during World War I ===
Towards the end of World War I in 1918, Munson joined the auspices of the Rockefeller Foundation and worked at the Red Cross Military Hospital in Paris, France, as the Chief of Dispensaries. In 1919, she moved to Eure-et-Loir, France and ran the provisional Chartres Tuberculosis Hospital. During her time in France, Munson established a lab and ran the TB hospital until 1922. The French government bestowed her with the Medaille d'Honneur (Medal of Honor) for her commitment and honorable work during World War I. She left France from Le Havre on the Rochambeau and returned to the United States in 1922.

Upon her return to the United States, Munson became the associate editor and director of the Research Department at the International Medical and Surgical Survey. She remained an active member of the American Medical Association, the New Jersey State Medical Society, the New York County Medical Society, Monmouth County Medical Society, the Daughters of the American Revolution, and the American Association of University Women.

== Later life ==
At the age of 52, Munson married James Alexander Hare on February 16, 1924. Hare was born in Scotland in 1874 and immigrated to the U.S. in 1874. He studied German at Harvard College and worked at Forstmann & Huffman Textile Company. He had one daughter, named Annie, from his previous marriage to Christine C. Odenweller of Massachusetts. The couple settled in Passaic, New Jersey, and had no children.

Evidence suggests that Munson continued working in New York City until around 1941 when she died. She was buried in Groton, Connecticut.
