= Charles Bartlett (RAF officer) =

British World War I flying ace

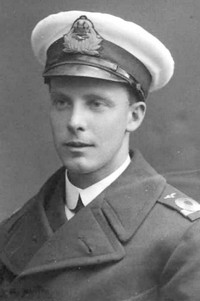
- Charles Philip Oldfield Bartlett
- Born: 3 January 1889; Weston-super-Mare, Somerset, England
- Died: February 1987 (aged 98); Cheltenham, Gloucestershire, England
- Military career
- Allegiance: United Kingdom
- Branch: Royal Naval Air Service; Royal Air Force
- Service years: 1914–1932
- Rank: Squadron Leader
- Unit: No. 5 Naval Squadron RNAS
- Conflicts: World War I
- Awards: Distinguished Service Cross & Bar

Charles Philip Oldfield Bartlett, DSC & Bar (3 January 1889 – February 1987) was a British flying ace of the First World War, credited with eight aerial victories in the course of flying bombing sorties against the Germans. He remained in service after the war, even though he struggled with health issues that threatened his forced resignation. He would serve until 1932, rising to the rank of squadron leader.

== Personal life ==
Charles Philip Oldfield Bartlett was born on 3 January 1889 in Weston-Super-Mare, Somerset, England. His father was Rector of Willersley.

After his experiences in the First World War, Bartlett recorded his wartime experiences in the books Bomber Pilot, 1916–1918 and In the Teeth of the Wind: The Story of a Naval Pilot on the Western Front, 1916–1918. In his later years, he lived at Cheltenham, Gloucestershire, England. He died there in March 1986.

== First World War ==
Bartlett began military service in the Royal Naval Air Service during the First World War. He first came to notice on 3 April 1916 when he was confirmed as a probationary flight sub-lieutenant for temporary service. He was certified as a pilot on 21 June 1916, being granted Royal Aero Club Certificate 3118.

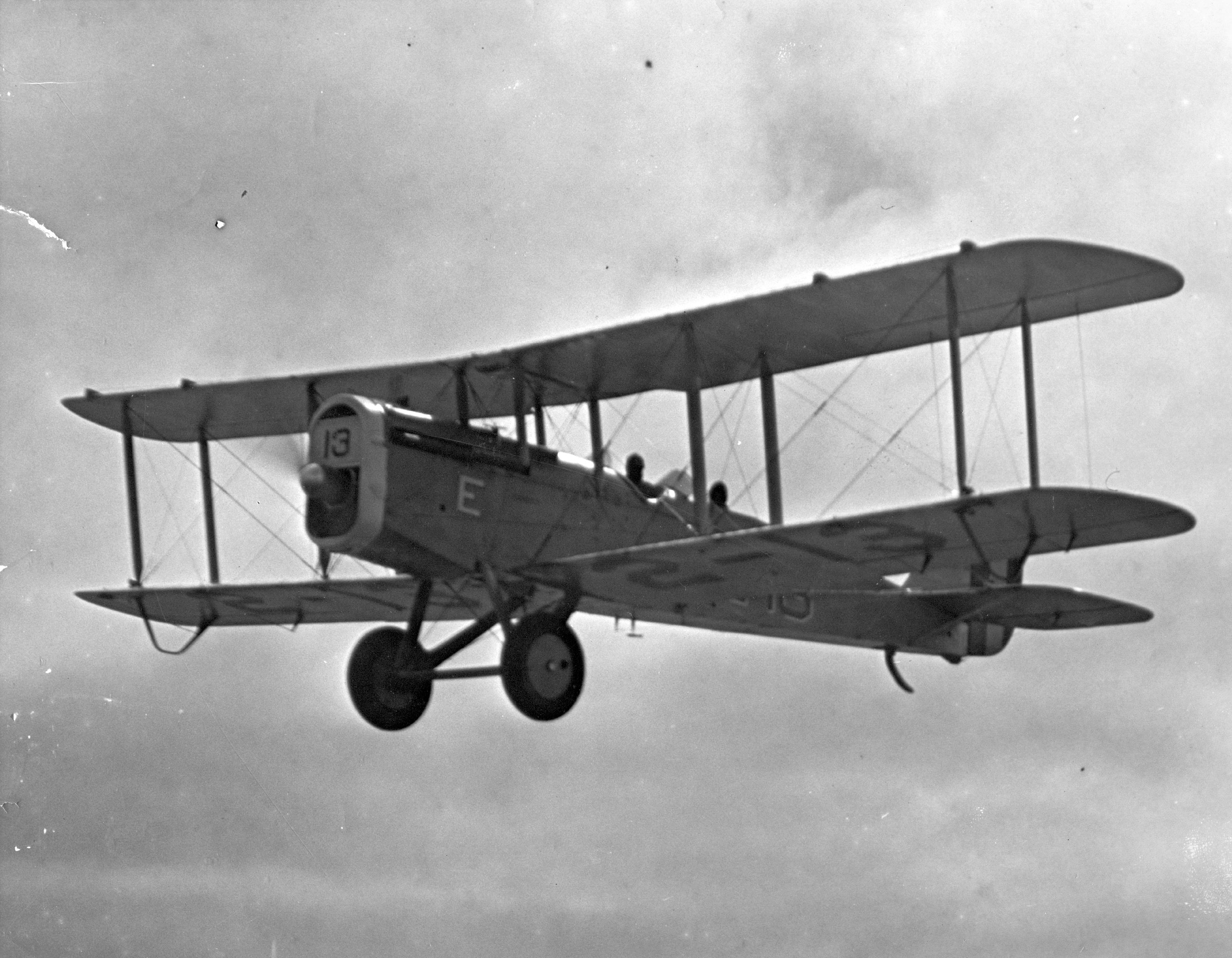
DeHavilland DH.4B

Bartlett went into combat in France as an Airco DH.4 bomber pilot in No. 5 Naval Squadron. He scored his first aerial victory on 2 July 1917. However, this was incidental to his main mission, as the citation for his Distinguished Service Cross (DSC) makes clear. When it was gazetted on 14 September 1917, it read:

For exceptionally good work on the occasion of a bombing raid on Houttave Aerodrome on the 25th July, 1917.

Bartlett would not score again until 30 January 1918. However, on 1 March, he was promoted from temporary flight lieutenant to temporary flight commander. In the latter part of March, Bartlett and his observer/gunner Walter Naylor would reel off a string of six more victories in the course of carrying out their bombing missions against the Germans. The string of triumphs was notable enough for specific mention in the award of a Bar to his DSC. An account of the actions, as gazetted on 17 May 1918, credited him with causing the midair collision of two of his opponents:

For conspicuous bravery and devotion to duty in carrying out bombing raids and in attacking enemy aircraft.

On the 28th March, 1918, he carried out three bombing raids. Whilst returning from one of these missions he was attacked at a height of about 2,500 feet by three enemy triplanes, and five other scouts. One of these he drove down, attacking it with his front guns, whilst his observer shot down out of control a second. Observing that two of the triplanes were diving on him and converging, he side-slipped his machine away with the result that the two enemy machines collided and fell to the ground together, where they burst into flames.

He has carried out very many bombing raids, and brought down several enemy machines, invariably showing the greatest skill and determination.

Bartlett had flown 101 bombing sorties by April 1918, when he went into hospital. Subsequently, on 12 July, after the RNAS had been merged into the Royal Air Force, Lieutenant Bartlett, already serving as a temporary captain, was promoted to act as temporary major. He would emerge from hospital in September 1918.

== Post-war ==
Bartlett continued in Royal Air Force service after the war, even though he constantly struggled with health problems. On 3 September 1919, he gave up his commission because of sickness, though he was entitled to retain his rank.

However, this revocation of his commission must have been rescinded, because on 24 February 1922, he was restored to full pay from half pay. Later that year, on 27 December, he was once again invalided from the RAF with the honorary rank of Major. A few days later, on 1 January 1923, his discharge for ill health was once again cancelled. Subsequently, he served six years as an Adjutant at RAF Manston's School of Technical Training. He would continue to serve until 26 August 1932, when he retired as a squadron leader.

Bartlett was then hired as a civilian adjutant at Ruislip. In 1936, he became the bursar at Bryanston School. He would later have the same job at Saint Dunstan's Training Center for the Blind, staying until 1945.

== List of aerial victories ==
| No. | Date/time | Aircraft | Foe | Result | Location | Notes |
|---|---|---|---|---|---|---|
| 1 | 2 July 1917 @ 1230 hours | Airco DH.4 serial number N5967 | Albatros D.V | Driven down out of control | Zeebrugge | Observer/gunner: S. D. Sambrook |
| 2 | 30 January 1918 @ 1330 hours | Airco DH.4 s/n N6001 | Albatros D.V | Driven down out of control | Engel Airfield | Observer/gunner: Walter Naylor |
| 3 | 18 March 1918 @ 1102 hours | Airco DH.4 s/n N5961 | Albatros D.V | Driven down out of control | Beaurevoir | Observer/gunner: Walter Naylor |
| 4 | 21 March 1918 @ 1804 hours | Airco DH.4 s/n N6000 | Fokker Dr.I Triplane | Driven down out of control | Honnecourt-sur-Escaut | Observer/gunner: Walter Naylor |
| 5 | 27 March 1918 @ 1045 hours | Airco DH.4 s/n N6000 | Albatros D.V | Driven down out of control | Fontaine | Observer/gunner: Walter Naylor |
| 6 | 28 March 1918 about 1000 hours | Airco DH.4 s/n N6000 | Fokker Dr.I Triplane | Destroyed | Raincourt | Observer/gunner: Walter Naylor |
| 7 | 28 March 1918 about 1000 hours | Airco DH.4 s/n N6000 | Fokker Dr.I Triplane | Destroyed | Raincourt | Observer/gunner: Walter Naylor |
| 8 | 28 March 1918 about 1000 hours | Airco DH.4 s/n N6000 | Fokker Dr.I Triplane | Destroyed | Raincourt | Observer/gunner: Walter Naylor |
