= John Gamon (RAF officer) =

English World War I flying ace

- Born: 25 July 1898; Chester, Cheshire, England
- Died: 5 December 1976 (aged 78)
- Military career
- Allegiance: United Kingdom
- Branch: Royal Navy; Royal Air Force
- Service years: 1916–1919; 1940–1945
- Rank: Captain
- Unit: No. 5 Squadron RNAS/No. 205 Squadron RAF
- Conflicts: World War I World War II
- Awards: Distinguished Service Cross

Captain John Gamon DSC (25 July 1898 – 5 December 1976) was an English World War I flying ace credited with seven aerial victories.

== Biography ==
=== Early life and background ===
Gamon was the second of three sons born to John Percival Gamon (1865–1934), a solicitor and notary, and his wife Margaret Alice (née Geddes), of Chester, Cheshire. His elder brother, Captain Sydney Percival Gamon (1895–1918) served in the Cheshire Regiment before joining the Royal Flying Corps. Posted to a Home Defence squadron, he was killed in a flying accident, aged 23. The youngest brother, Geoffrey Alexander Percival Gamon (1901–1934), was also killed in an accident in Cairo.

=== World War I ===
Gamon entered the Royal Naval Air Service as a probationary temporary flight sub-lieutenant, being commissioned as a flight sub-lieutenant on 30 July 1916, five days after his 18th birthday. Assigned to No. 5 Squadron RNAS, flying the DH.4, Gamon gained his first victory on 8 December 1917 forcing down an Albatros D.V over Aertrycke airfield. He was promoted to flight lieutenant on 31 December 1917. Gamon's next victory came on 30 March 1918 when he destroyed a Fokker Dr.I during the First Battle of Villers-Bretonneux, and a result he was awarded the Distinguished Service Cross. His citation reads:

Flight Lieutenant John Gamon, RNAS.

For conspicuous gallantry and devotion to duty. On 30 March 1918, whilst returning from a bombing raid, he was attacked by three enemy triplanes, one of which he brought down and drove off the other two. He has carried out very many bombing raids on enemy lines of communication, aerodromes, and dumps. His work has always been of the greatest merit, and he has set a splendid example to those around him.

Two days later, on 1 April, the Royal Naval Air Service and the Army's Royal Flying Corps were merged to form the Royal Air Force, and No. 5 Squadron RNAS was renamed No. 205 Squadron RAF. Gamon was promoted to captain on 4 April. He accounted for two more enemy aircraft on 23 April, and shared two more on 3 May, all over Chaulnes. His seventh and final victory came on 20 May, destroying a Pfalz D.III over Mericombe.

Gamon left the RAF after the war, being transferred to the unemployed list on 11 June 1919.

=== World War II ===
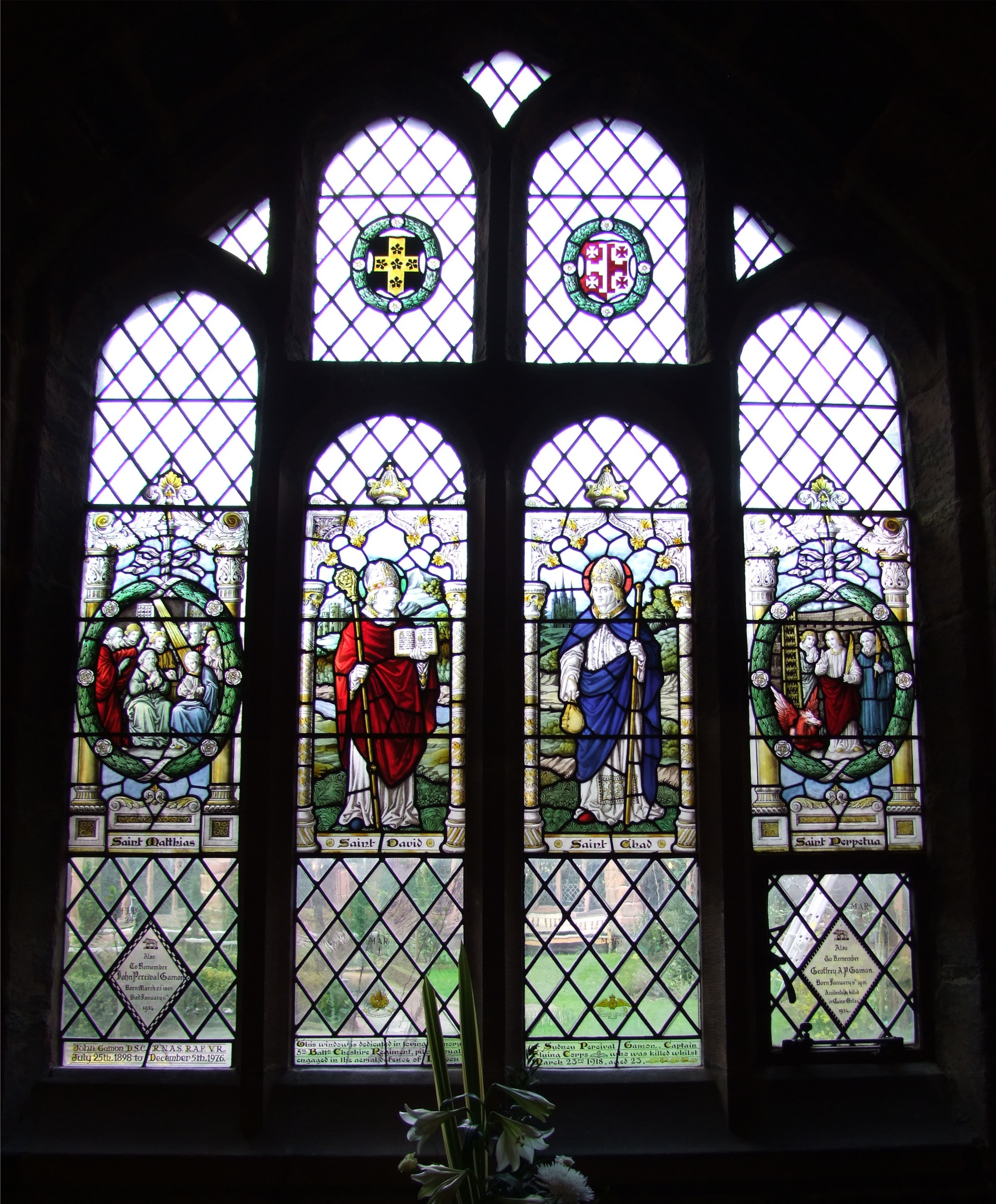
The Gamon family window at Chester Cathedral

Gamon returned to military service during World War II, being commissioned as a probationary pilot officer "for the duration of hostilities" in the Royal Air Force Volunteer Reserve on 27 September 1940. He was confirmed in his appointment, and promoted to the war substantive rank of flying officer on 27 September 1941. He was promoted to flight lieutenant on 1 January 1944.

He remained in the Air Force Reserves after the war, finally relinquishing his commission on 10 February 1954, being permitted to retain the rank of flight lieutenant.

Gamon died on 5 December 1976, and he, alongside his father and brothers, is commemorated in a window in the cloister of Chester Cathedral.
