= Robert Barbour (RAF officer) =

Scottish airman and a flying ace

Robert Lyle McKendrick Barbour
- Born: 31 August 1895; Scotland
- Died: 1980 (aged 84–85); Devon, England
- Military career
- Allegiance: United Kingdom
- Branch: British Army; Royal Air Force
- Rank: Group Captain
- Units: King's Own Scottish Borderers; Royal Flying Corps; No. 205 Squadron RAF
- Awards: Distinguished Flying Cross; Air Force Cross

Group Captain Robert Lyle McKendrick Barbour, DFC, AFC (31 August 1895 – 1980) was a Scottish airman and a flying ace of the First World War credited with six aerial victories.

== Biography ==
Barbour attended the Royal Military College, Sandhurst, as a Gentlemen Cadet, from where he was commissioned as a second lieutenant in the King's Own Scottish Borderers on 27 October 1916. On 22 December 1917 he was seconded to the Royal Flying Corps, receiving promotion to lieutenant on 27 April 1918. As a pilot with No. 205 Squadron RAF, he shot down six enemy aircraft between June and October 1918, the first three in a DH.4, and the latter three in a DH.9A. For his efforts, Barbour was awarded the Distinguished Flying Cross. The citation for the award read:

This officer has carried out twenty-nine bombing raids and forty-seven photographic reconnaissances, displaying at all times marked courage and clear judgment. On 9th October, when on reconnaissance, he was attacked by ten Fokkers and forced to retire; on the disappearance of the Fokkers he again crossed the line; he was then attacked by three Fokkers, but these he drove off, shooting down one, which was seen to crash.

Barbour resigned his army commission on 1 August 1919 in order to accept a permanent commission in the Royal Air Force. He was promoted from flying officer to flight lieutenant in December 1925, and was awarded the Air Force Cross in the 1928 Birthday Honours. He received further promotions; to squadron leader on 1 October 1934, to wing commander on 31 December 1937, and to temporary group captain on 1 September 1940.
