= Parnall Panther =

Panther
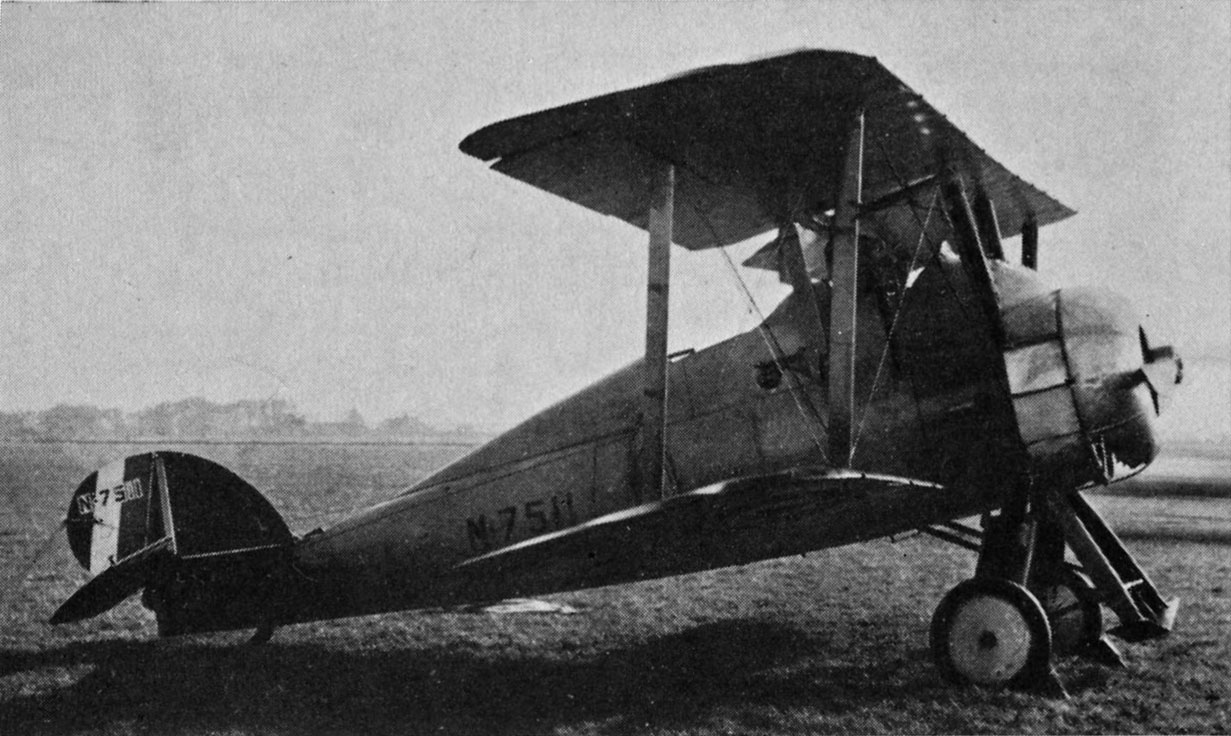

General information
- Type: Carrier-based reconnaissance
- Manufacturer: Parnall and Sons
- Designer: Harold Bolas
- Primary users: Fleet Air Arm IJN Air Service; United States Navy
- Number built: 155

History
- Introduction date: 1919
- First flight: 1917
- Retired: 1926

The Parnall Panther was a British carrier-based, spotter and reconnaissance aircraft designed and developed by Parnall and Sons in the latter years of the First World War, continuing in service until 1926. A total of 150 Panthers were built by Bristol Aeroplane Company since after the end of the war, Parnall had stopped aircraft manufacture.

== Development ==
The Parnall Panther was designed by Harold Bolas, who had joined Parnall and Sons after leaving the Admiralty Air Department, where he had served as deputy chief designer under Harris Booth. It was planned to meet the requirements of Admiralty Specification N.2A for a two-seat reconnaissance aircraft capable of operating from aircraft carriers. The first prototype (serial N91) flew in 1917, with a further five prototypes being produced.

== Design ==
The Panther was a wooden, single-bay biplane, which, unusually for the time, was fitted with a birch plywood monocoque fuselage which could be folded for shipboard storage, the fuselage being hinged aft of the observer's cockpit. The pilot and observer were seated in individual cockpits in the deep fuselage, this giving a good view for landing but restricting access to the pilot's cockpit. Inflatable flotation airbags were fitted beneath the wings in case the aircraft ditched into the sea, with a hydrovane in front of the undercarriage, to stop the aircraft from nosing over.

== Operational history ==
After evaluation, an order for 300 Panthers was placed with Parnall in 1918 and then reduced to 150 following the end of the war. Parnall's owners, W & T Avery, rejected this reduction in the order and it was transferred to the Bristol Aeroplane Company, the order being completed between 1919 and 1920. The Panther served with Spotter Reconnaissance Flights aboard the aircraft carriers HMS Argus and Hermes. While the Panthers handled well in the air, the elderly Bentley engines proved unreliable and the system of longitudinal arrestor wires in use aboard British aircraft carriers, was unsatisfactory, resulting in many accidents. Panthers continued in service with the Fleet Air Arm until 1926, being replaced by the Fairey IIID. Two Panthers were sold to the US Navy in 1920. Twelve Panthers were sold to the Imperial Japanese Navy in 1921–22.

== Operators ==
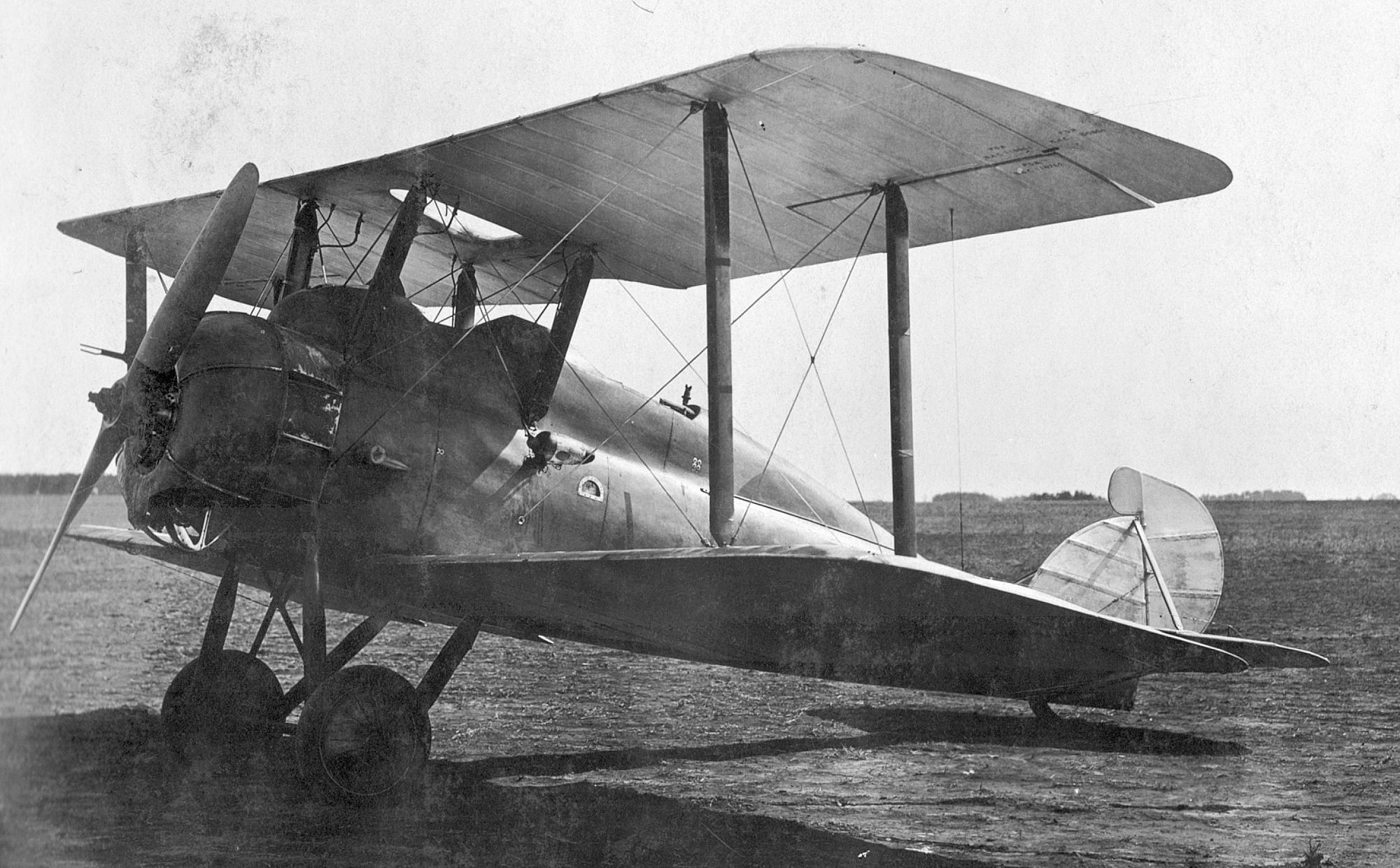
Japanese Navy's Parnall Panther

United Kingdom

- Fleet Air Arm
- Royal Air Force
  - No. 205 Squadron RAF

Japan

- Imperial Japanese Navy Air Service

United States

- United States Navy

== Specifications ==
Data from British Naval Aircraft since 1912

General characteristics

- Crew: 2
- Length: 24 ft 11 in (7.59 m) (14 ft 6 in (4 m) folded)
- Wingspan: 29 ft 6 in (8.99 m)
- Height: 10 ft 6 in (3.20 m)
- Wing area: 336 sq ft (31.2 m^{2})
- Empty weight: 1,328 lb (602 kg)
- Max takeoff weight: 2,595 lb (1,177 kg)
- Powerplant: 1 × Bentley BR2 9-cylinder air-cooled rotary piston engine, 230 hp (170 kW)
- Propellers: 2-bladed fixed-pitch propeller

Performance

- Maximum speed: 108.5 mph (174.6 km/h, 94.3 kn) at 6,500 ft (1,981 m)
- Range: 480 mi (770 km, 420 nmi)
- Endurance: 4 hours 30 minutes
- Service ceiling: 14,500 ft (4,400 m)
- Time to altitude: 2,000 ft (610 m) in 2 minutes 20 seconds

Armament

- Guns: .303 in (7.7 mm) Lewis gun in observers cockpit

== See also ==
- Sempill Mission
- Aircraft carrier
- Royal Naval Air Service

== Bibliography ==
- Donald, David (1997). Encyclopedia of World Aircraft (Rev. ed.). Enderby: Blitz Editions. ISBN 978-1-85605-375-4.
- Mason, Francis Kenneth (1994). The British Bomber: Since 1914. London: Putnam Aeronautical Books. ISBN 978-0-85177-861-7.
- Thetford, Owen (1978). British Naval Aircraft since 1912 (4th ed.). London: Putnam. ISBN 0-370-30021-1.
- Wixey, Kenneth E. (1990). Parnall Aircraft since 1914. Annapolis, Maryland, US: Naval Institute Press. ISBN 1-55750-930-1.
