= William Elliott (RAF officer) =

William Boyd Elliott
- Born: 26 August 1898; St. Catharines, Ontario, Canada
- Died: 27 March 1979 (aged 80)
- Military career
- Allegiance: George V
- Branch: Flying service
- Service years: 1917 - 1918
- Rank: Captain
- Units: No. 103 Squadron RFC, No. 205 Squadron RAF
- Awards: Distinguished Flying Cross

Captain William Boyd Elliott was a World War I flying ace credited with five aerial victories.

== Honours and awards citations ==
Distinguished Flying Cross (DFC)

Lieut. (T./Capt.) William Boyd Elliott.

This officer has taken part in one hundred bombing raids, in the majority of which he was leader. While leading one bombing raid his formation was attacked by thirty hostile machines; ten of these were destroyed, the objective was successfully bombed, and the formation returned without the loss of a machine, attributed to Captain Elliott's skillful leadership.

Supplement to the London Gazette, 2 November 1918 (30989/12964)
