= Charles Robinson (RAF airman) =

British flying ace (1897–1961)

Charles Victor Robinson
- Born: 24 May 1897; Marylebone, London
- Died: 28 July 1961 (aged 64); Northampton, Northamptonshire
- Military career
- Allegiance: United Kingdom
- Branch: Royal Navy; Royal Air Force
- Rank: Sergeant
- Units: No. 5 Squadron RNAS; No. 205 Squadron RAF
- Awards: Distinguished Flying Medal

Serjeant Charles Victor Robinson DFM (24 May 1897 – 28 July 1961) was a British World War I flying ace credited with seven aerial victories. He flew on at least 100 bombing missions as an observer.

== Awards and citations ==
Distinguished Flying Medal
No. 207177 Serjeant Charles Victor Robinson, late 205th Squadron, Royal Air Force.

"On 18 May 1918, whilst acting as observer in a bombing attack on Chaulnes Railway Junction, his formation was attacked by seven enemy scouts. His machine was attacked simultaneously by two of these, one of which he shot down in flames. On the previous day he dropped a 112-pound (50 kg) bomb on this junction, causing a great conflagration. Serjeant Robinson has carried out 100 successful bombing raids, and is a most reliable Observer."
