= Euan Dickson =

New Zealand WW1 bomber pilot (1892–1980)

- Flight Sub-Lieutenant Euan Dickson RN
- Born: 31 March 1892; Sheffield, England
- Died: 10 March 1980 (aged 87); Auckland, New Zealand
- Military career
- Allegiance: United Kingdom
- Branch: Royal Naval Air Service; Royal Air Force
- Service years: 1916–1919
- Rank: Captain
- Units: 10 Squadron RNAS; No. 5 Squadron RNAS/205 Squadron RAF
- Conflicts: First World War
- Awards: Distinguished Service Cross & Bar; Distinguished Flying Cross; Croix de Guerre (France)

Euan Dickson, DSC & Bar, DFC (31 March 1892 – 10 March 1980) was a British-born New Zealander bomber pilot and flying ace in the First World War. Serving with the Royal Naval Air Service (RNAS) and subsequently the Royal Air Force (RAF), he flew over 150 missions flying the D.H.4 aircraft. As well as flying so many bombing missions he, and his observer, was also credited with shooting down 14 enemy aircraft. After the war he returned to New Zealand and was the first person to fly across the Cook Strait.

== Early life ==
Dickson was born in Sheffield, Yorkshire, England where his family lived at 12 Harland Road (off Ecclesall Road) on 31 March 1882 and emigrated to New Zealand about 1912, taking a job with an engineering firm in Thames on the North Island.

== First World War ==
In 1916 Dickson decided to return to Britain to enlist for the war. Joining the Royal Navy he was commissioned as a flight sub-lieutenant in July 1916 and was awarded his pilot's licence, number 3966, on 12 December 1916 by the Royal Aero Club.

Dickson was posted to 10 Squadron RNAS in March 1917 but in April was transferred to No. 5 Squadron RNAS. This squadron was a bomber squadron flying the Airco D.H. 4 two-seater biplane aircraft and it was in this type that Dickson flew all his combat missions. On 18 December 1917 Dickson was awarded the Distinguished Service Cross (DSC) for his part in a bombing mission. The citation for his award reads:

For conspicuous gallantry and devotion to duty in a bombing raid on Thourout Railway Station and Varsennaere Aerodrome on 25 October 1917. These officers volunteered for the expedition in spite of extremely unfavourable weather conditions. They have all previously taken part in many bombing raids.

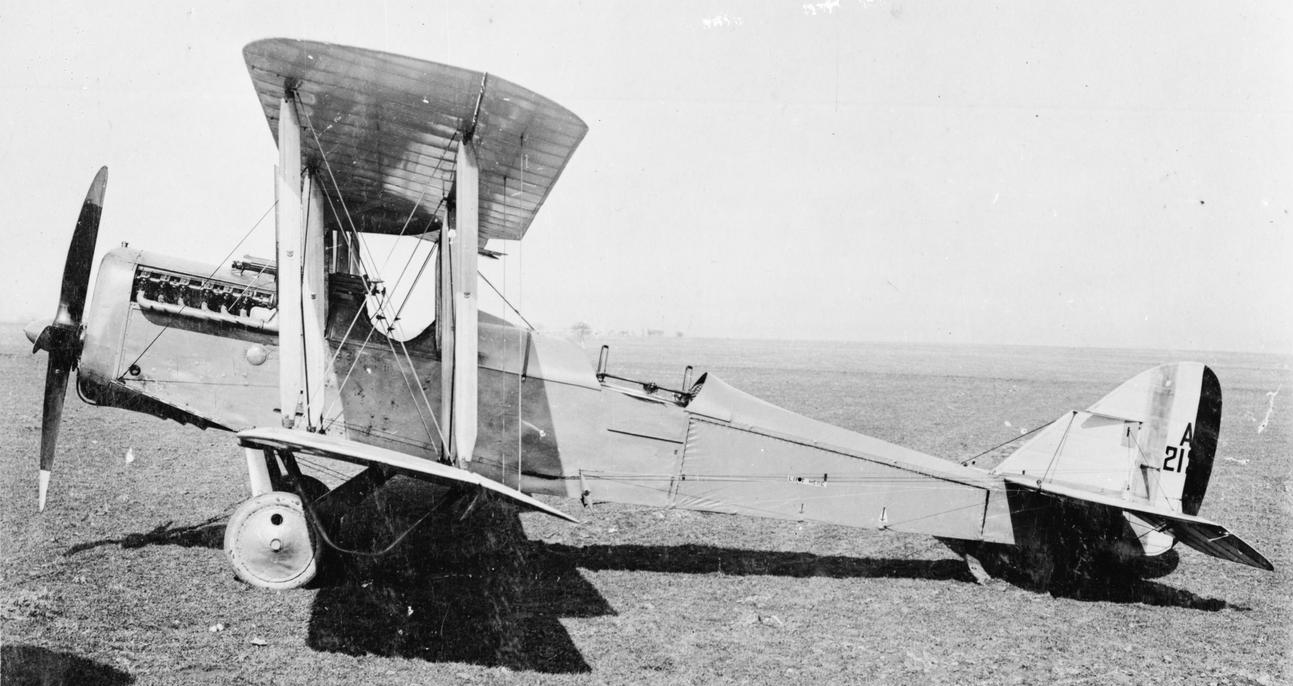
An early production version of the DH.4 similar to the type flown by Dickson.

Promoted to temporary flight lieutenant in December 1917, a Bar to the DSC was won in March 1918 for coming to the aid of another aircraft which was under attack. His citation reads:

For conspicuous gallantry in attacking enemy aircraft and in carrying out bombing raids. On 16 March 1918, he went to the assistance of a machine of his formation which was being attacked at close quarters by twelve enemy scouts. Despite the fact that all the guns on his machine, were useless owing to lack of ammunition, he turned and charged the hostile formation, splitting it up and diverting their attention from the other machine, thus undoubtedly saving it. On other occasions he has brought down enemy machines and taken part in many daylight bombing raids, at all times showing utter fearlessness and great determination.

In April 1918, the Royal Flying Corps and the RNAS were merged to form the Royal Air Force and No. 5 Squadron RNAS became No. 205 Squadron RAF. Dickson continued to fly with the squadron until August 1918, earning a Distinguished Flying Cross for his leadership, with the citation reading:

Since 17 April 1918, this officer has led eighty-four successful bombing raids. His leadership has been conspicuous for remarkable bravery, skill, and determination. On one raid directed, against a town in occupation by the enemy he obtained seven direct hits on the railway station and four on a dump outside. Thrice on a prior date he led his flight to attack enemy billets and horse lines, descending to low altitudes and engaging enemy troops on the ground.

The Croix de Guerre was also awarded to Dickson by the French Army. On leaving No. 205 Squadron, he was posted to a Home Establishment in the United Kingdom until his discharge from the RAF in November 1919.

=== Combat victories ===
Dickson and the observers he flew with were credited with 14 air combat victories, two of them shared with other crews.

Combat victories
Number	Date	Observer	Opponent	Location
1	8 December 1917	Air Mechanic Shaw	Albatros D.V	Aertrycke Airfield
2	17 February 1918	Air Mechanic, 1st Grade, Walter Naylor DSM	Albatros D.V	Ostend
3	18 February 1918	Air Mechanic, 1st Grade, Walter Naylor DSM	Albatros D.V	St. Pierre Capelle
4	16 March 1918	Flight Sub-Lieutenant Walter Scott	Albatros D.V	Bohain-Le Catelet
5	18 March 1918	Flight Sub-Lieutenant Walter Scott	Albatros D.V	Beaurevoir
6	27 March 1918	Flight Sub-Lieutenant Stewart	Albatros D.V	Rainecourt
7	28 March 1918	Flight Sub-Lieutenant Stewart	Pfalz D.III	Foucaucourt
8	6 April 1918	Serjeant Charles V Robinson DFM	Pfalz D.III	Abancourt
9	22 April 1918	Serjeant Charles V Robinson DFM	Fokker Dr.I	Chaulnes
10	23 April 1918	Serjeant Charles V Robinson DFM	Fokker Dr.I	Chaulnes
11	3 May 1918	Serjeant Charles V Robinson DFM	Pfalz D.III	Chaulnes-Rosières
12	3 May 1918	Serjeant Charles V Robinson DFM	Pfalz D.III	Chaulnes-Rosières
13 (Note: Shared victory)	3 May 1918	Serjeant Charles V Robinson DFM	Pfalz D.III	Chaulnes-Rosières
14	18 May 1918	Serjeant Charles V Robinson DFM	Albatros D.V	Chaulnes

== Later life ==
In 1920 Dickson returned to New Zealand and on 25 August 1920 became the first person to fly the Cook Strait between North Island and South Island. Working for Canterbury Aviation he was the inaugural pilot of the first daily air mail service in New Zealand in 1921, a service between Auckland and Timaru. In later life he became chairman of the Eden Motor Company before retirement in 1964.
