= Chaulnes =

- Commune
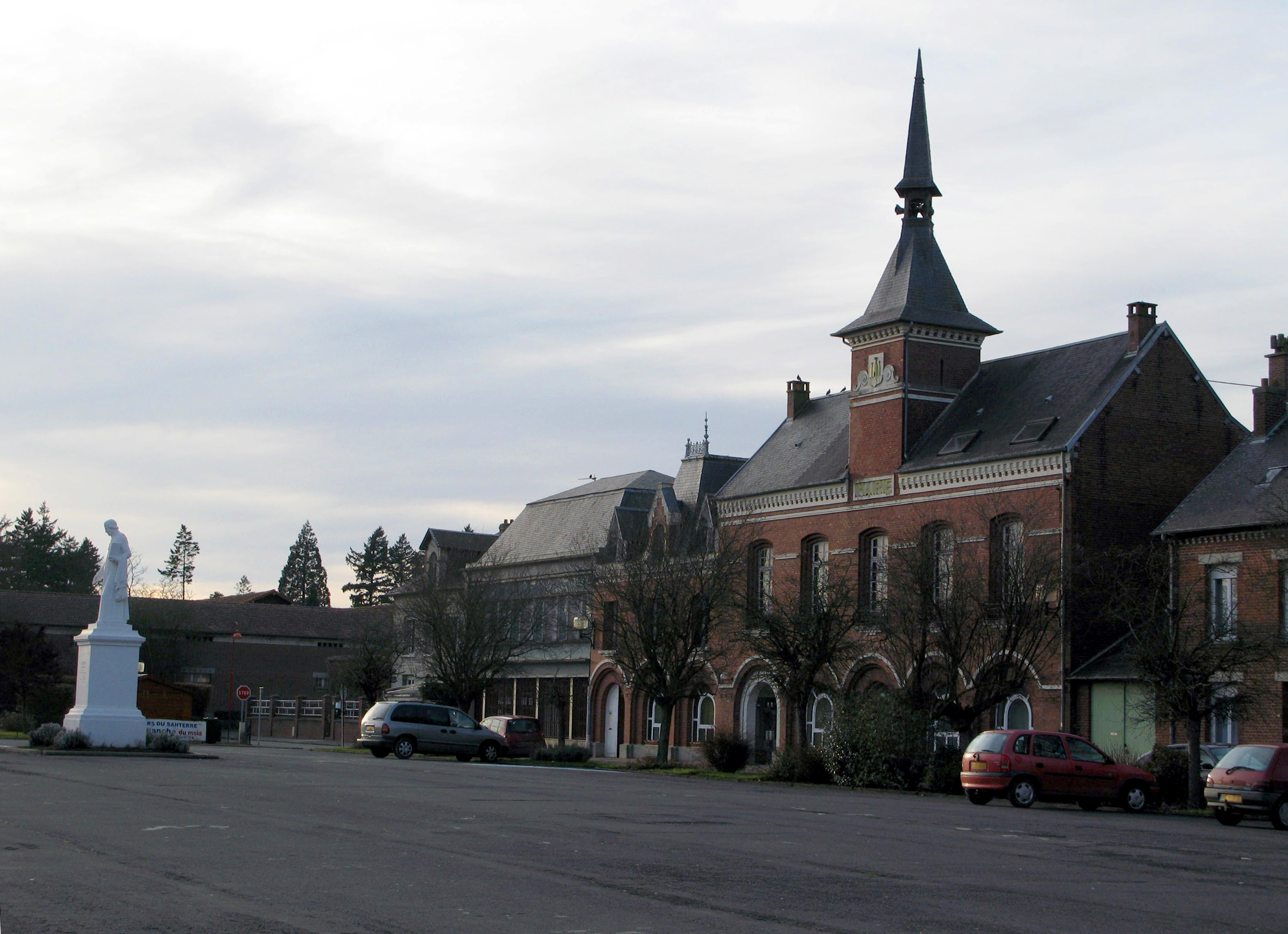
- City hall

- Coat of arms
- Location of Chaulnes
- Location within France Location within Hauts-de-France
- Coordinates: 49°48′59″N 2°48′17″E
- Country: France
- Region: Hauts-de-France
- Department: Somme
- Arrondissement: Péronne
- Canton: Ham
- Intercommunality: CC Terre de Picardie

Government
  - Mayor (2020–2026): Thierry Linéatte
- Area^{1}: 8.46 km^{2} (3.27 sq mi)
- Elevation: 94 m (308 ft)
- Highest elevation: 104 m (341 ft)
- Lowest elevation: 80 m (260 ft)
- Population (2023): 1,969
  - Density: 233/km^{2} (603/sq mi)
- Time zone: UTC+01:00 (CET)
  - Summer (DST): UTC+02:00 (CEST)
- INSEE/Postal code: 80186 /80320
- ^{1} French Land Register data, which excludes lakes, ponds, glaciers > 1 km^{2} (0.386 sq mi or 247 acres) and river estuaries.

Chaulnes (French pronunciation: [ʃo(l)n]; Picard: Chonne) is a commune in the Somme department in Hauts-de-France in northern France.

== Geography ==
Chaulnes lies in the eastern part of the Somme department, 13 km north of Roye. The Chaulnes station is served by local trains between Amiens and Laon.

== Demography ==
Historical population
Year	Pop.	±% p.a.
1968	1,483	—
1975	1,550	+0.63%
1982	1,616	+0.60%
1990	1,785	+1.25%
1999	1,901	+0.70%
2007	1,936	+0.23%
2012	1,959	+0.24%
2017	2,083	+1.24%
2023	1,969	−0.93%
Source: INSEE

== Culture ==
Chaulnes is noted for its cultural events, especially the heavy metal music festival Chaulnes Metal Fest (previously known as Killer Fest before 2008). Each year, more than 500 fans turn up to see and listen to bands like Obituary, Sodom, Rage or Nashville Pussy.

== Personalities ==
- Charles François Lhomond, grammarian and wit, born at Chaulnes 1727, died in Paris 1794.
- The duchy of Chaulnes was established in 1621 for the Albert family.

== Places and monuments ==
- The statue of grammarian Lhomond, sculpted by Eugène-Louis Lequesne, in 1860, paid for by public subscription.

== See also ==
- Communes of the Somme department
- Réseau des Bains de Mer
