= Thomas Devin Reilly =

Irish revolutionary (1824–1854)

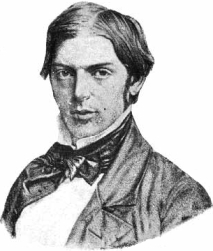
Thomas Devin Reilly(1823-1854)

Thomas Devin Reilly (Tomás Damhán Ó Raghailligh) (30 March 1824 – 5 March 1854) was an Irish revolutionary, Young Irelander and journalist.

== Early life and Young Ireland ==
Thomas Devin Reilly was born in Monaghan Town on 30 March 1824, the son of Thomas Reilly, a solicitor with a large practice in both Monaghan and Dublin. His early education was spent at Huddart's seminary in Usher's Quay, Dublin, and in 1842, would enrol in Trinity College, Dublin. According to John Mitchel, Reilly, at the age of fifteen, "was attacked by a fit of some kind resembling apoplexy." In 1845, Devin Reilly would join the editorial staff of The Nation, becoming a regular contributor. The chief editor of The Nation, Charles Gavan Duffy, wrote of Devin Reilly in his memoirs, Four Years In Irish History:

"...outspoken to a charm, perhaps to a fault. He was middle-sized, but strongly built, with a head that seemed unduly large even for his sturdy frame, a great crop of light hair, and large, full, protruding blue eyes. He was a big, clumsy, careless, explosive boy in appearance, but he possessed a range of ideas and a vigour of expression which made him a companion for men."

Among Devin Reilly's contributions for The Nation included a critically acclaimed review of the French socialist and historian Louis Blanc's book, Histoire de Dix Ans (History of Ten Years: 1830-1840). John Savage wrote of Devin Reilly's contributions to The Nation that he had "by his powerful pen, written his burly figure into a front rank."

Devin Reilly was also a founding member of the Irish Confederation, having left Daniel O'Connell's Repeal Association in the famous walkout from Conciliation Hall in 1846. He would deliver two fiery speeches to the Confederation, prompting James Fintan Lalor, in a letter to Mitchel in June 1847, to write:

"Who, what and where is Devin Reilly? He made two speeches at the Confederation, which is all I know of him. If the man be equal to the speeches – not always the case – he ought to be the foremost man in the Confederation."

Mitchel, in particular, would prove to be Devin Reilly's closest ally and friend in Young Ireland with both chafing under the constitutionalist programme of the Confederation, and when Mitchel tendered his resignation from both The Nation and the Confederation in quick succession in late 1847, Devin Reilly followed suit and would join the editorial staff of Mitchel's physical force republican newspaper, The United Irishman, in February 1848. One of Devin Reilly's most notorious articles would be "The French Fashion," which Mitchel himself regarded as "one of the most telling revolutionary documents ever penned." The United Irishman would run for only sixteen issues, before the paper was suppressed and Mitchel was convicted under the Treason Felony Act 1848. Devin Reilly would be briefly arrested on suspicion of having unlawfully engaged in drilling and training exercises with members of the Confederates through the streets of Dublin, although would be released without charge.

Devin Reilly would then write for John Martin's The Irish Felon, continuing to promote physical force republicanism until The Irish Felon was also suppressed by the authorities. In early July 1848, Devin Reilly would be elected to a five-man executive of the Confederate Clubs, who were organising for an insurrection. Travelling through Kilkenny and Tipperary alongside William Smith O'Brien and Michael Doheny to muster men, Devin Reilly would play a role in the failed Young Ireland Rebellion at Ballingarry, County Tipperary.

Following the defeat of the rebels, Devin Reilly would in the aftermath quietly escape to America, fleeing Dublin disguised as a groom, arriving in New York City in December 1848.

== In America ==
Upon his arrival in New York, he became active in US political affairs in support of Irish independence.

He is reported as having founded The People newspaper in New York City which folded after six months in 1849.

James Connolly claims that as the editor of the Protective Union labour rights newspaper for the printers of Boston, Devin Reilly was a pioneer of American labour journalism and that Horace Greeley believed of his series of articles in the American Review on the European situation "that if collected and published as a book, they would create a revolution in Europe".

It is possible that Connolly has confused the United States Magazine And Democratic Review, which was known for its political activism, with the American Review, which for a time had Edgar Allan Poe as an editorial assistant - other sources refer to Devin Reilly being editor of the New York Democratic Review and later the Washington Union.

He died in 1854 at the age of 30 and is buried at Mount Olivet Cemetery in Washington, D.C., together with his infant child Mollie and wife Jennie Miller from Enniskillen.

== Quotes ==
In a speech to the Irish Confederation delivered on 21 April 1847:

"You are all slaves. ‘Tis time you should learn the truth – ‘tis time you should open your eyes to your own abasement, and open your hearts to the sorrows of your country. False flatterers – sycophants of your vices – have told you, you are a brave and a noble people – that you are the bravest and noblest people of Europe, and so forth. Now, I, one of you – one of the class, in false language, called “the people” – one, too, of that native race which the English government proposes to brush off the Irish soil – tell you, you are no such thing. You are nobles, citizens, merchants, farmers, beggars, and all – what your present masters and owners call you – an inferior caste, because they are your masters and owners. You are at this present moment the most humiliated, the most pitiable, the most helpless, the most despised people, with a white skin, on the face of God’s whole earth... So, even should Irish Nationality perish for ever – should our race and name be indeed extinguished – should the memories of our fathers, the murder of our brothers, sink unavenged into the eternity of chaos – should the green island of ocean sparkle no more with verdure, but glisten in the Atlantic with the whitening bones of her children – even so, the world will recognise in the nobility of our death a grand example of patriotism and manhood; and Heaven itself, moved to tears and wrath, looking down upon the land where we fell, will avenge the fate of a nation of heroes."

Writing in The Irish Felon on the June 1848 uprising in France :-

"We are not Communists - we abhor communism for the same reason we abhor poor-law systems, and systems founded on the absolute sovereignty of wealth. Communism destroys the independence and dignity of labour, makes the workingman a State pauper and takes his manhood from him. But, communism or no communism, these 70,000 workmen had a clear right to existence - they had the best right to existence of any men in France, and if they could have asserted their right by force of arms they would have been fully justified. The social system in which a man willing to work is compelled to starve, is a blasphemy, an anarchy, and no system. For the present these victims of monarchic rule, disowned by the republic, are conquered; 10,000 are slain, 20,000 perhaps doomed to the Marquesas. But for all that the rights of labour are not conquered, and will not and cannot be conquered. Again and again the labourer will rise up against the idler - the workingmen will meet this bourgeoisie, and grapple and war with them till their equality is established, not in word, but in fact".

== Books by Young Irelanders ==
Additional reading

- The Politics of Irish Literature: from Thomas Davis to W.B. Yeats, Malcolm Brown, Allen & Unwin, 1973.
- John Mitchel, A Cause Too Many, Aidan Hegarty, Camlane Press.
- Thomas Davis, The Thinker and Teacher, Arthur Griffith, M.H. Gill & Son 1922.
- Brigadier-General Thomas Francis Meagher His Political and Military Career, Capt. W. F. Lyons, Burns Oates & Washbourne Limited 1869
- Young Ireland and 1848, Dennis Gwynn, Cork University Press 1949.
- Daniel O'Connell The Irish Liberator, Dennis Gwynn, Hutchinson & Co, Ltd.
- O'Connell Davis and the Colleges Bill, Dennis Gwynn, Cork University Press 1948.
- Smith O’Brien And The “Secession”, Dennis Gwynn, Cork University Press
- Meagher of The Sword, Edited By Arthur Griffith, M. H. Gill & Son, Ltd. 1916.
- Young Irelander Abroad The Diary of Charles Hart, Edited by Brendan O'Cathaoir, University Press.
- John Mitchel First Felon for Ireland, Edited By Brian O'Higgins, Brian O'Higgins 1947.
- Rossa's Recollections 1838 to 1898, Intro by Sean O'Luing, The Lyons Press 2004.
- Labour in Ireland, James Connolly, Fleet Street 1910.
- The Re-Conquest of Ireland, James Connolly, Fleet Street 1915.
- John Mitchel Noted Irish Lives, Louis J. Walsh, The Talbot Press Ltd 1934.
- Thomas Davis: Essays and Poems, Centenary Memoir, M. H Gill, M.H. Gill & Son, Ltd MCMXLV.
- Life of John Martin, P. A. Sillard, James Duffy & Co., Ltd 1901.
- Life of John Mitchel, P. A. Sillard, James Duffy and Co., Ltd 1908.
- John Mitchel, P. S. O'Hegarty, Maunsel & Company, Ltd 1917.
- The Fenians in Context Irish Politics & Society 1848-82, R. V. Comerford, Wolfhound Press 1998
- William Smith O'Brien and the Young Ireland Rebellion of 1848, Robert Sloan, Four Courts Press 2000
- Irish Mitchel, Seamus MacCall, Thomas Nelson and Sons Ltd 1938.
- Ireland Her Own, T. A. Jackson, Lawrence & Wishart Ltd 1976.
- Life and Times of Daniel O'Connell, T. C. Luby, Cameron & Ferguson.
- Young Ireland, T. F. O'Sullivan, The Kerryman Ltd. 1945.
- Irish Rebel John Devoy and America's Fight for Irish Freedom, Terry Golway, St. Martin's Griffin 1998.
- Paddy's Lament Ireland 1846-1847 Prelude to Hatred, Thomas Gallagher, Poolbeg 1994.
- The Great Shame, Thomas Keneally, Anchor Books 1999.
- James Fintan Lalor, Thomas, P. O'Neill, Golden Publications 2003.
- Charles Gavan Duffy: Conversations With Carlyle (1892), with Introduction, Stray Thoughts On Young Ireland, by Brendan Clifford, Athol Books, Belfast, ISBN 0-85034-114-0. (Pg. 32 Titled, Foster’s account Of Young Ireland.)
- Envoi, Taking Leave Of Roy Foster, by Brendan Clifford and Julianne Herlihy, Aubane Historical Society, Cork.
- The Falcon Family, or, Young Ireland, by M. W. Savage, London, 1845. (An Gorta Mor)Quinnipiac University
