= Joseph Brenan =

Irish poet, journalist and author

Joseph Brenan (also Brennan; 17 November 1828 – 27 May 1857) was a poet, journalist and author, and leading member of the Young Irelanders and Irish Confederation.

== Early life ==
Joseph Brenan, was born in Cork on 17 November 1828. Brenan began to write verse at an early age, and was one of the genuine poets of the Young Ireland movement. His earlier poems were published under the initials "J. B., Cork," or "J. B—n," and some of his American verses under the pseudonym "Gondalez." He was also an able prose writer.

Brenan was an active member of the Cork Historical Society, and was one of the editors of the Cork Magazine, which appeared in November 1847, and continued to appear until the end of 1848, when the journal then ceased publication. Some of its contributors, who included Frazer, Martin MacDermott, Fitzjames O'Brien, Mulchinock and Mary Savage, would later either end up in jail or in exile.

== 1848 Rising ==
In January 1848, John Mitchel visited Cork and, according to Michael Cavanagh, who would publish a sketch of his Brenan's life in Young Ireland, Dublin, in June and July 1885, Brenan for the first time "beheld the man he most admired on earth, and with whose future destiny, whether for weal or woe, he felt his own was bound up. Never had the arch-enemy of England a more faithful or earnest follower."

Brenan contributed to the Mitchel's United Irishman and, sold his rifle to obtain his train fare, to take up his residence in Dublin, the headquarters of the revolutionary movement. He later published articles in John Martin's Irish Felon urging the Confederate Clubs members, many of whom had arms to be in readiness for action. "The sooner you realise the fact," he wrote in a Letter addressed to the Members of the Provincial Confederate Clubs, "that the Confederation was got up for the purpose of doing something, the better for us all. Just think what it undertook to do. It undertook to defeat the strongest Government and to liberate the most degraded country that ever existed. It undertook to give – to a province—to strike the chains off millions of slaves and, if necessary, to wash out the, iron moulds in blood."

In another Letter to "the Young Men of Ireland" on 22 July 1848, he wrote: "On you I principally rely. You realise that you are very 'rash,' rather inclined to be 'violent,' and have exceedingly little prudence to spare. Brothers, let your watchword be 'Now or never—now and for ever' rashly"

Brenan was associated with John Savage and John O'Mahony while Savage was operating on the slopes of the Comeragh Mountains. Brenan was arrested and kept in prison for seven months alternately in Newgate Prison, Carrickfergus and Kilmainham Gaols. During his confinement he wrote some fine poems, according to T. F. O'Sullivan, one, entitled "Yearnings," evidently addressed to Mary Savage, sister of John.

After his release without trial in March 1849, Brenan became editor of the Irishman which had been started in Dublin by Bernard Fulham, and for six months attempted to rekindle the insurrectionary flame in the country. He was implicated in the attack on the Cappoquin police barracks on 16 September 1848 and in October escaped to America.

== Escape to America ==
In America he became associated with a number of journals, including Horace Greeley's Tribune, Devin Reilly's People, The Enquirer of Newark, Jersey, and the New Orleans Delta in which he wrote a series of papers under the pen-name Ben Fox. On 27 August 1851, Brenan married Mary Savage, in her parents house, on Thirteenth Street, New York.

Brenan wrote some articles and poems for John Mitchel's Citizen in 1854. He was an enthusiastic supporter of the Southern cause, and had founded the New Orleans Times.

== Death ==
Joseph Brenan died on 27 May 1857, at the early age of twenty nine and was buried in the old French cemetery of New Orleans. During the last year of his life he was almost totally blind. He was attended in his last illness by Dr. Dalton Williams. There were seven children of the marriage, only one of whom, Florence, survived their parents. She possessed her father's literary ability, but devoted her life to religion as a member of the Mercy Order.

== Conclusion ==
His best known poem, "Come to Me, Dearest," was addressed to Mary Savage before their marriage. The love story of Joseph Brenan and "Mary" has been told in the sketch by Ellen Mary Patrick Downing, afterwards Sister Mary Alphonsus.
