= James Fintan Lalor =

Irish revolutionary, journalist and writer

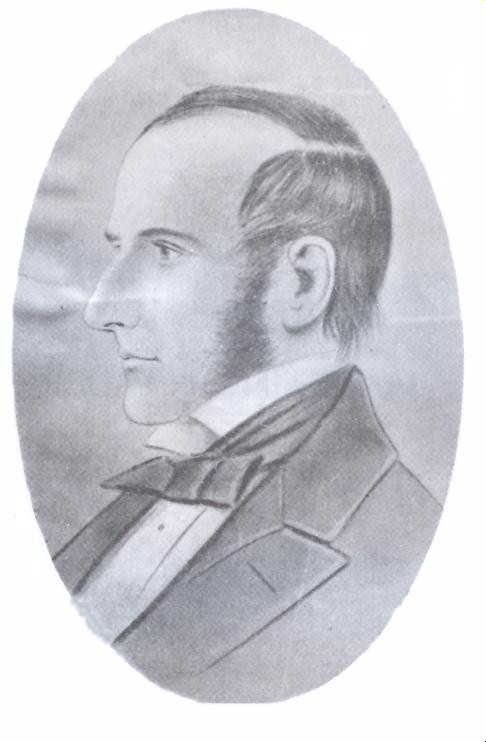
James Fintan Lalor 1807 – 1849

James Fintan Lalor (in Irish, Séamas Fionntán Ó Leathlobhair) (10 March 1809 – 27 December 1849) was an Irish revolutionary, journalist, and “one of the most powerful writers of his day.” A leading member of the Irish Confederation (Young Ireland), he was to play an active part in both the Rebellion in July 1848 and the attempted Rising in September of that same year. Lalor's writings were to exert a seminal influence on later Irish leaders such as Michael Davitt, James Connolly, Pádraig Pearse, and Arthur Griffith.

== Early life ==
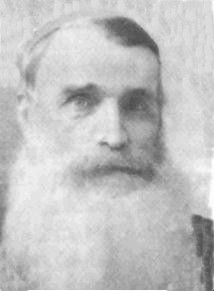
Richard Lalor

James Fintan Lalor was born in Tinnakill House (Fintan Lalor always referred to his birthplace as Tenakill), Raheen, County Laois (known at the time as Queen's County) on 10 March 1807. The first son of Patrick "Patt" Lalor and Anne Dillon (daughter of Patrick Dillon of Sheane near Maryborough). Patrick and Anna were to have twelve children. Patrick was to become the first Catholic M.P. for Laois in 1832 - 1835, and was to lead a campaign of passive resistance to the payment tithes. Patrick was to outlive his eldest son by six years, dying in 1856, and his mother Anna was to die in 1835, the same year as his brother Joseph.

James was, according to Tomás Ó Néill one of his biographers, a fine healthy baby when born, but as the result of an accident as an infant, was left semi-crippled. Though small for his age, being both pale and delicate, James was to display unexpected strength of body. Though hardy enough he was never sent to school, having private tuition at home instead. This was to continue up until he was seventeen when it was then decided that he should go to college.

== St Patrick's, Carlow College ==
In February 1825, he went to St. Patrick's, Carlow College, the vice-president of which, Father William Kinsella, was to go on to become the bishop of Ossory. It was Father William himself who welcomed James to the college and introduced him to Maurice Lenihan, who was to be his advisor and guardian. In College, James studied both chemistry, under a Mr Holt and the classics under Father Andrew Fitzgerald. While in college he became a member of the Apollo Society, where literature and music were studied, his favourite author at the time being Lord Bolingbroke.

In college one of the great influences on James was Bishop James Doyle. In the controversies over tithes, education and the freedom of religion Dr. Doyle, writing under the pen name J.K.L, was considered very influential. An atmosphere of patriotism in the college was encouraged, and this was shown later, not just in James Fintan's later life, but in that of students such as John O'Leary, Richard D'Alton Williams and Maurice Leyne.

While in college James worked hard and learnt the basics and principles not just of chemistry but law also. This understanding of law, Tomás Ó Néill suggests became evident from his writings later on. He suffered greatly through ill health during his time in college, and in February 1826, being ill and very weak he had to return home.

== After College ==
Not much is known about James after he left college, most information being based on oral tradition. One suggestion is that he became an apprentice to a Dr. John Jacob, who worked in Portlaoise county hospital. In June 1827 Dr. Jacob died and was replaced by his son who was a young medical student. The suggestion is that they did not get on and James left the hospital. Another account put forward for this period is that he left the hospital because of a "disappointment in love.” It is then suggested that James intended to sail to France. Tomás Ó Néill is fairly certain that James never went to France, and points to the fact that there is no reference to it in James's later writings.

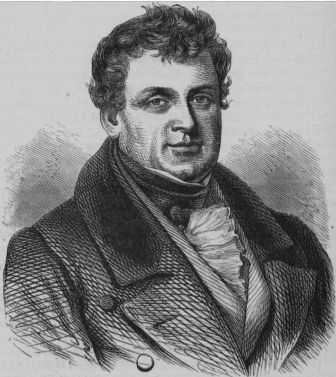
Daniel O'Connell

However, T. F. O’Sullivan's account of his life, in The Young Irelanders, states that he did in fact go and lived there for a couple of years, being supplied with money by his mother. What is known though, is that there is no real definite account at all about him for several years.

== Tithe Campaign ==
Catholic Emancipation had been granted in 1829, and according to Patrick Lalor, Catholics would never be fully free while the burden of a foreign faith was on them in the form of tithes. Supported by his family, Patrick at a public meeting in Portlaoise, said he intended to give up paying tithes to a foreign faith. As a result of this declaration, Arthur Moore Mosse, who was the secretary of the Grand Jury, asked Patrick to call off his campaign offering to give him a receipt for the year's tithe, but he refused. Mosse then offered him a receipt that would free him from tithes for the rest of his life, and this was also refused.

Shortly after, the proctor seized twenty of the brothers' sheep, but they got replevin and the sheep had to be returned. When the sheep had to be sold the family painted "Tithe" on them, which meant no one would buy them. On the way to Smithfield market in Dublin, no one would offer any help to the drovers. In Dublin, the only bid for them was from the steward of the Rev. John Latouch, a Mr. Brough. It was Latouch who had sent the proctor to the Lalors in the first place. As a result of this, the sheep had to be placed on a boat for Liverpool, but even there no one would bid for them, so they were then driven to Manchester and then to Leeds: most died on the road.

The Lalor brothers had through their father become politically active. (The Tithe War had started according to O'Neill, but it would be some time before it would end.)

== Politics ==
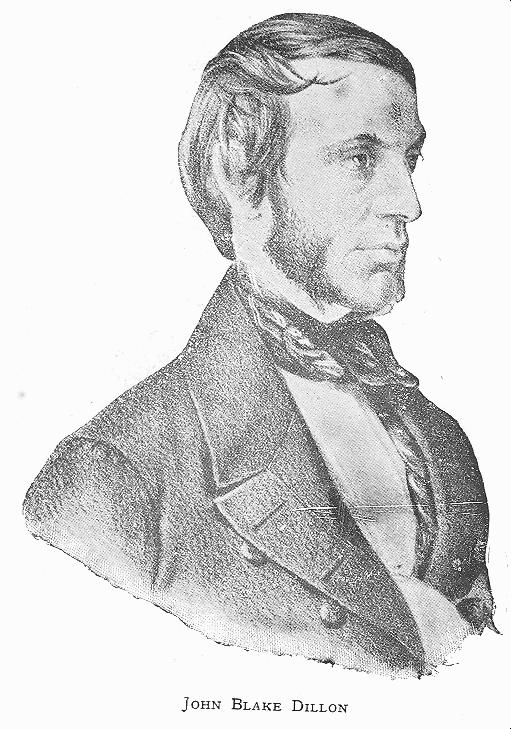
John Blake Dillon

Politics began to play an important part in the life of the Lalor family. In 1832 Patrick Lalor, was called to give evidence before a Select Committee, having been recognised as one of the leaders in Daniel O'Connell's Repeal Association. He founded himself the Laois Liberal Club, which was in later years part of the election machinery for Parnell. During the elections of this year, Patrick was to come in ahead of Sir Charles Coote, the Tory Party candidate winning the seat, and this was seen as a major victory for the cause. During the campaign the Tory paper, the Leinster Express, attempted to destroy Patrick's character, claiming he himself was a tyrant. Patrick was in 1835 to lose his seat to Thomas Vesey, the son of Lord Vesey. Lord Vesey during the election compelled his tenants to vote against their conscience, and those who did not were evicted from their holdings.

Around this time there were a number of secret societies in Ireland. With names such as the Blackfeet, Whitefeet and the Terryalts. These groups originated from the Whiteboys of the previous generation. It was these groups who reacted to these types of evictions. James was of the view the root of the problem lay not with the societies but with the power of the landlords to evict tenants. Lalor's great friend at this time was John Marnell, also the son of a farmer, and he too shared Lalor's views. It was the issue of land and the ownership of land which was to shape the rest of James Fintan Lalor's life.

== Temperance and The Shamrock Friendly Society ==
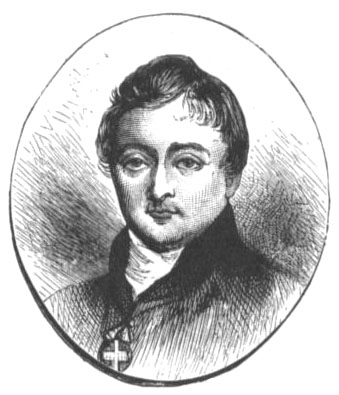
Theobald Mathew

In 1838 Father Mathew, the temperance priest, began his campaign. In just a year or two of starting this campaign, millions were to give up alcohol. One such society was formed in Raheen and Fintan Lalor became a member. In November 1840 he then proposed that the Society should become an association and that it should have additional aims also. This was agreed and the name was changed to The Shamrock Friendly Society. In this Society, they planned to organise free legal aid to help the poor, as well as organise reading and promote healthy games.

In addition to the Society, Fintan Lalor was influenced by a group of agrarian reformers in his native county. They were led by William Conner, who suggested a scheme for arbitration on rents and fixity of tenure for tenant farmers. Conner's suggestions were to find few supporters, but Fintan Lalor was one of them. He became closely associated with Conner and spent weeks at his house near Athy. He also attended Conner's public meetings which were held in various parts of Kildare and Laois.

Conner was finally charged with making a seditious speech at Mountmellick in 1841 for which he received a sentence of six months’ imprisonment. As a result of his activities, Conner was expelled from the Repeal Association because he proposed that Repealers should not pay rent, county cess, rent charge, tithe poor rate or any other charge arising out of land until repeal was granted. Fintan Lalor agreed with Conner and it was at this stage that his political differences with his Father really began.

== Repeal Association ==
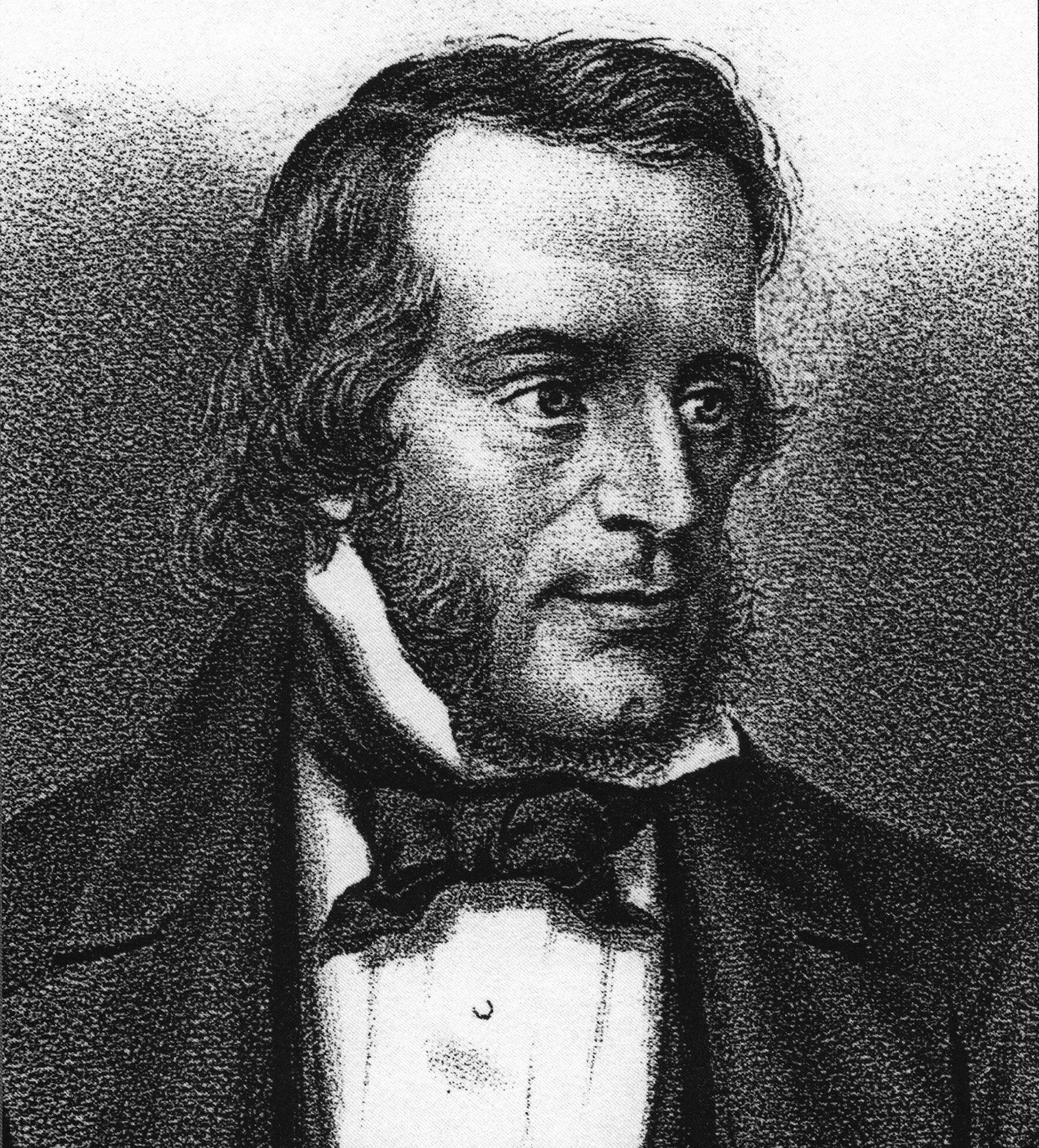
Thomas Davis

In 1840 Daniel O'Connell split with the Whigs and re-established the Repeal Association as a separate parliamentary entity. While support for another one of O'Connell's associations was slow to start, with the adhesion of both Thomas Davis, John Blake Dillon and Charles Gavan Duffy the Association was to quickly develop. James was totally opposed to both O'Connell and the Association. He thought O'Connell's whole policy was flawed, and wrote a letter to Robert Peel the head of government, calling for it to be suppressed. "Mr. O’Connell, his agitators, and his series of wretched agitations" had so "disgusted him" that he thought it "probable" that he should "soon be obliged to join the Conservative party openly and actively". In consequence, and notwithstanding that his "family—friends are all violent Repealers", he was offering his services to the government.

See Full text here: s:Letter to Robert Peel calling for Repeal to be suppressed

This opinion of O’Connell was to cause a rift to develop between Fintan Lalor and his father, who much admired O’Connell. The final event was an article Fintan Lalor was to write in January 1844 about the aims of the Irish Agricultural Society. As a result of this, their relationship was to break down completely, and Fintan Lalor was obliged to leave home.

== Dublin and Belfast ==
Having left home Fintan Lalor headed to Dublin. While in the capitol his health deteriorated and was to break down completely. Thomas Brady attended to him and treated him for a chest complaint. Based on the medication proscribed, O’Neill suggests that it seems likely that what he was suffering from was tuberculosis. Fintan Lalor was to never fully recover from this episode. When his father found out about his son's condition, he sent money to help him out. Though he could have returned home at this time, he went instead to look for employment. His friend John Marnell introduced him to William Blood, who ran a bank come pawn shop, where the poor could get loans at reasonable rates. Fintan Lalor then went to Belfast to learn more about this from a similar establishment run by a Father James Finn. He took ill again, at one stage vomiting blood, and on the advice of his family and friends was urged returned home to Tenakill. He wrote to his father and apologized for his many faults. As a result, the bonds between the two were mended. Fintan Lalor, did not return home though, instead staying in the city and attempting to find employment. But his health was again to break down and at last, he was forced to return home. By March 1846, he was back with his family in Tenakill.

== The Nation ==
The Great Irish Famine led him into direct action: he attempted to found tenant-right societies and organise rent strikes.

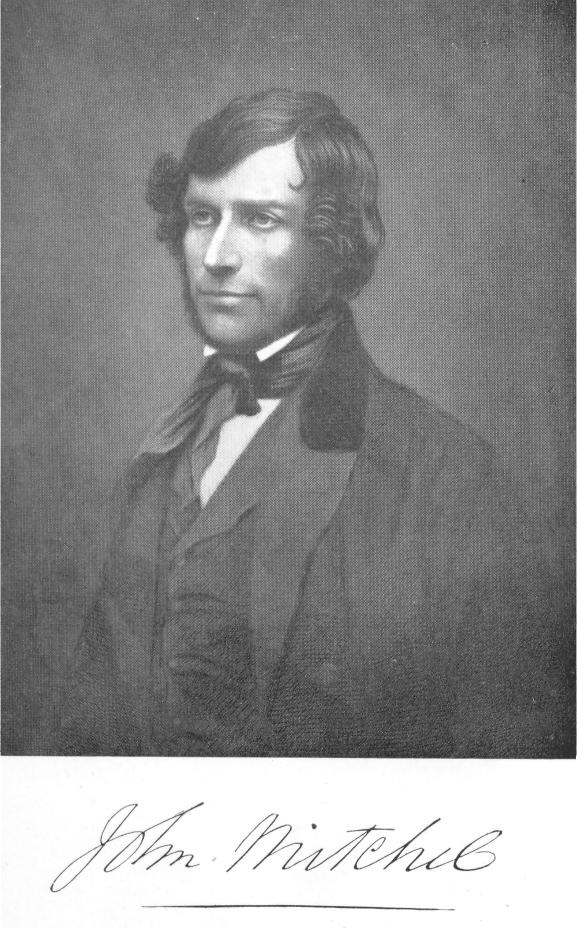
John Mitchel

On 11 January 1847, Fintan Lalor began to publish a series of "stirring and controversial letters and articles to newspapers such as The Felon and The Nation". Writing from Tenakill, his family home, Fintan Lalor put forward his views on current affairs and in particularly on land reform. His manner and style of writing quickly caught the attention of both its readers and staff. T. F. O’Sullivan commented that “the journal realise that a new force had arisen in the political world.” In the first letter, Fintan Lalor stated that contrasted with the question of the land, Repeal “was a petty, parish question.” On this he was quite emphatic “I will never contribute one shilling, or give my name, heart or hand for such an object as the simple Repeal.”

Commenting on the Irish Confederation, which was about to be formed he advocated that its policy should be one of “national independence.” He then proceeded to outline the policy he would approve on obtaining independence, “in what form of words you please; but denounce nothing—proscribe nothing, more especially of your own freedom of action. Leave yourselves free individually and collectively.” He continued “if any resolution, or pledge, be adopted to seek Legislative independence by moral force and legal proceedings alone, with a denunciation, or renunciation of all or any other means or proceedings, you may have millions better and stronger men than I to join you; but you won’t have me. . . . There has already, I think, been too much giving in on this question of means and force.”

He wrote again another letter on 19 April on the association between landowners and occupiers. Addressing himself to the landlords Fintan Lalor stated that “Ireland demanded more than her present dole of bread… Her demand was for a new Constitution…”

In his third letter titled “Tenants’ Rights” and “Landlord Law,” he addressed the subject of the famine. “Famine, more or less, was in 500,000 families—famine with all its diseases and decay; famine, with all its fears and horrors; famine, with all its dreadful pains and more dreadful debility. All pined and wasted, sickened and drooped; numbers died—the strong man, the fair maiden, the infant—the landlord got his rent… The 8,000 individuals who are owners of Ireland by divine right and the grant of God, confirm (by themselves) in sundry successive acts of parliament have a full view of these coming results [i.e. Ireland would become a pasture ground once gain. and its agricultural population would decay or vanish and become extinct at once] and have distinctly declared their intention of serving notice to quit on the people of Ireland…The landlords have adopted the process of depopulating the island and are pressing it forward to their own destruction, or to ours…” Fintan Lalor's view was that the Landlords were “enforcing self-defence on us.”

In September 1847, Fintan Lalor, along with Michael Doheny, organised at Holycross, in County Tipperary, for the purpose of putting forward his views on land reform. The meeting failed to produce the results he wanted. Lacking both eloquence as a public speaker, and his weak state of health also rendered him unfit to conduct a public campaign.

== The Irish Felon ==
John Mitchel one of the Confederation leaders, was very impressed by Lalor's views on land reform, and in a letter to William Smith O'Brien himself the leader of the Confederation, said of him “Mr. Lalor, …does not now go for the whole of his system, but contemplates violent pressure on the landlords of those districts to coerce them into a fair settlement of the tenure question; the coercion to take the form of non-payment to such landlords as hold out.” A policy Mitchel was later to adopt.

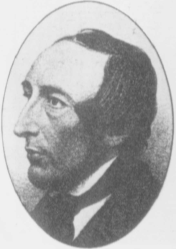
John Martin (1812–1875)

Having failed to rouse the farmers, Lalor retired again to Tenakill, and it was not till June 1848, that he again took to the public stage. He cooperated with John Martin in writing for The Irish Felon which started on June 4, 1848. The publication of the Felon was in response to the suppression of John Mitchel's United Irishman, and the transportation of Mitchel.

Among some of the titles were “What must be Done”, “The Faith of a Felon”, “Resistance”, and his final one being “Clearing Decks”, on 22 July 1848. T. F. O’Sullivan was to describe Fintan Lalor's writing as “powerful” of which three were included later in the indictment against, Martin for Treason Felony. Fintan Lalor responding to the indictment wrote to the Under Secretary, took responsibility for the articles, and asked that the charges against Martin be dropped, stating that he would take responsibility. This was refused and Martin was, like Mitchel transported. This prompted the following response from Fintan Lalor

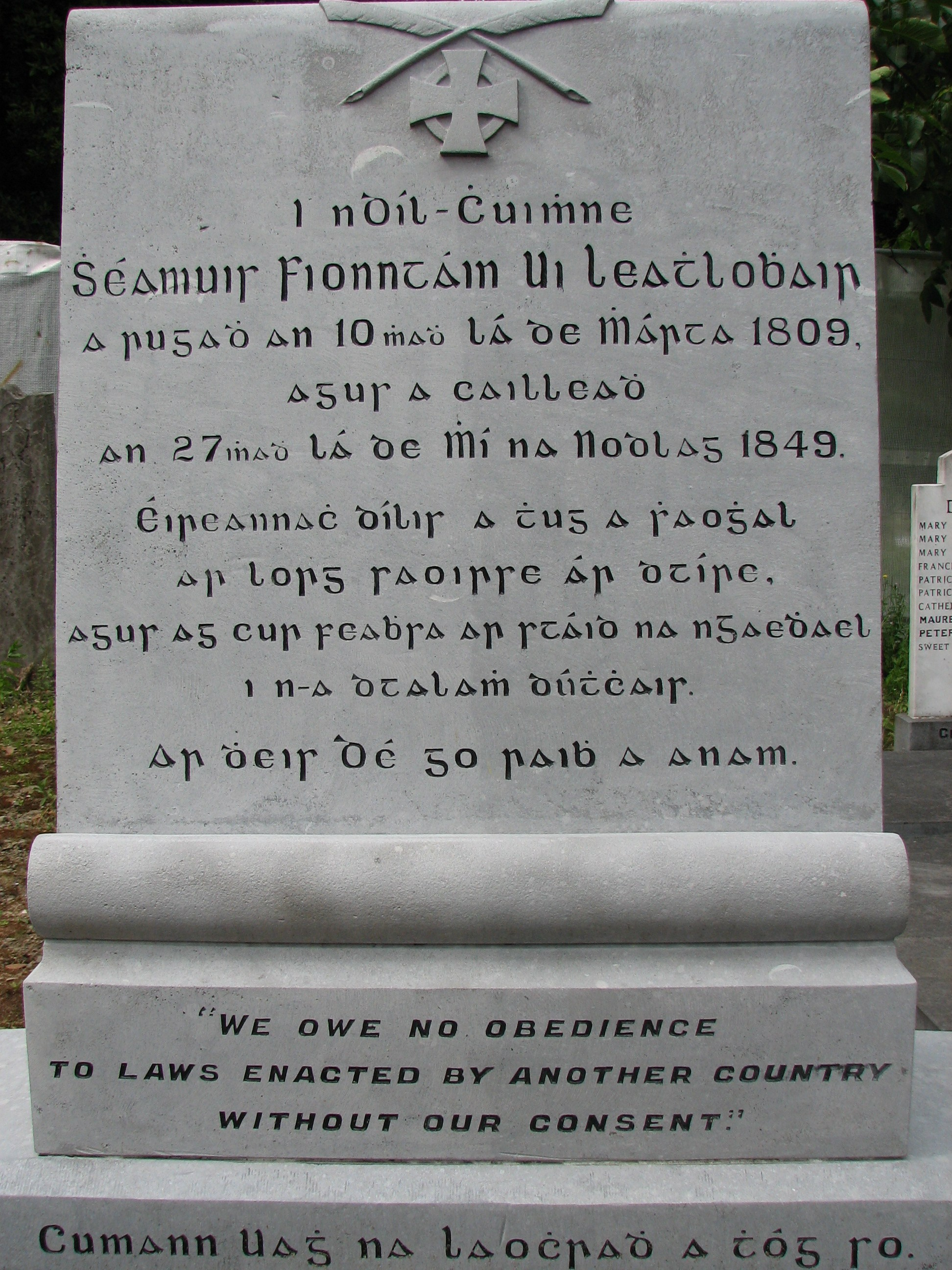
The inscription reads: In dear memory of James Fintan Lalor born on the 10th of March 1809 and died on 27 December 1849. A faithful Irishman who gave his life in the pursuit of freedom of our country and to improve the state of Irish people in their native land. May his soul be at the right hand of God, (The stone was erected by the National Graves Association (1933))

“The rights of property may be pleaded. No one has more respect for the than I have; but I do class among them the robber’s right by which the lands of this country are now held in fee for the British Crown. I acknowledge no right of property in a small class which goes to abrogate the rights of a numerous people… I deny and challenge all such rights, howsoever founded or enforced. I challenge them as founded only on the code of the brigand, and enforced only by the sanction of the hangman.”

In another letter in the Irish Felon titled “The First Step—The Felon Club,” which was published on 1 July, Lalor addressing the Government wrote “We hold the present existing government of this island and all existing rights of property in our soil, to be mere usurpation and tyranny, and to be null and void as of moral effect; and our purpose is to abolish them entirely, or lose our lives in the attempt. The right founded on conquest and affirmed by laws made by the conquerors themselves, we regard as no other than the right of the robber on a larger scale. We owe no obedience to laws enacted by another nation without our consent, nor respect to assumed rights of property which are starving and exterminating our people…” Outlining his intentions he wrote

“We have determined to set about creating, as speedily as possible, a military organisation, of which the Felon office shall be the centre and citadel. As a first step of proceeding, we are now founding a Club which, it is intended, shall consist of one, two or more persons from each parish throughout Ireland who are to be in immediate connection and correspondence with this office. . . . A prospectus and set of rules are in preparation, which we will publish when completed. But without waiting for such publication, we earnestly request every man in Ireland who desires to enrol himself as a colleague and comrade, and as a member of the Felon Club, will signify his wish by letter to the provisional secretary, Mr. Joseph Brenan, Felon office, 12 Trinity Street.”

In his last article for the Irish Felon “Clearing Decks,” Lalor wrote —“Remember this—that somewhere and somehow, and by somebody, a beginning must be made. Who strikes the first blow for Ireland? Who draws first blood for Ireland? Who wins a wreath that will be green forever?”

== Arrest and Rising ==
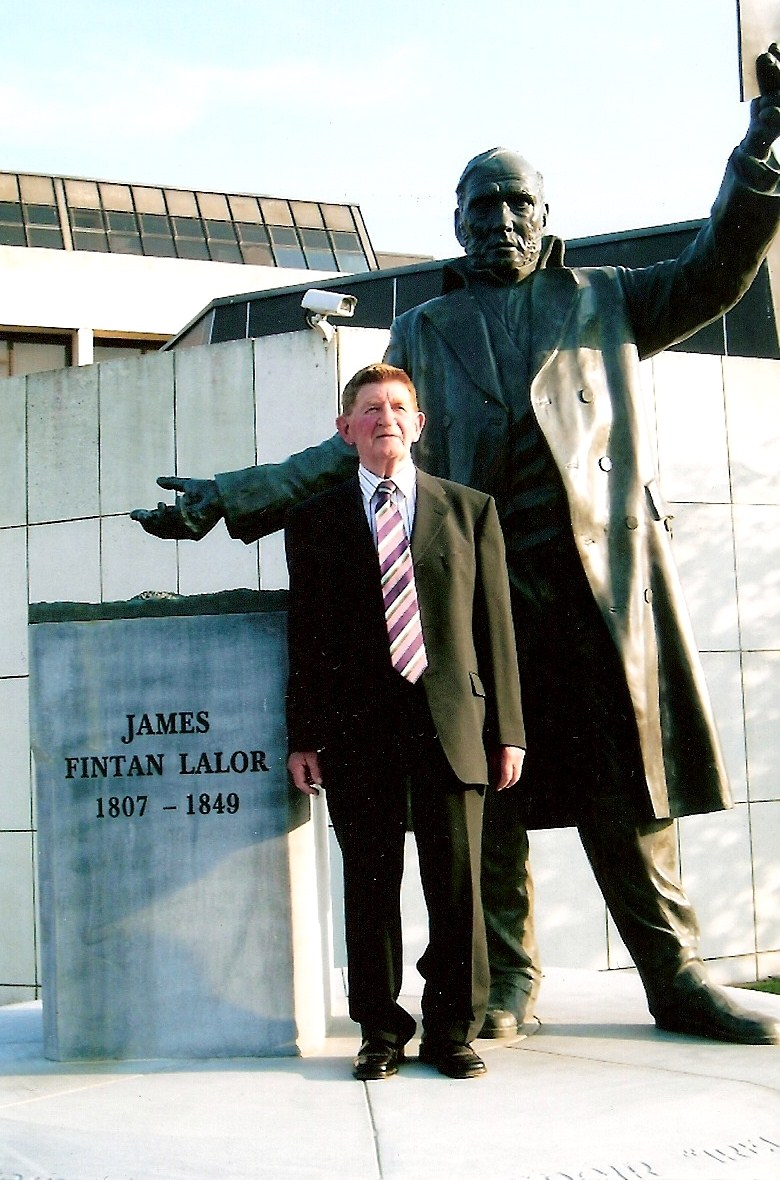
David Lawlor with bronze statue of James Fintan Lalor

Six days later Lalor was arrested under the suspension of the Habeas Corpus Act, and kept in prison for some months, after which he was released owing to the bad health which had been affected by his imprisonment.

“His spirit, however, was undaunted,” according to O’Sullivan, and in the following year he set about organising a revival of the insurrection” in co-operation with John Savage, Joseph Brennan, John O'Leary and Thomas Clarke Luby in Tipperary and Waterford. At Cappoquin, in September, Savage and Brenan attacked the police barracks but the other leaders did not have sufficient forces at their command to take aggressive action in the districts in which they were working, and the insurgents had to separate.

Three months afterwards, on 27 December 1849, Lalor died in his 43rd year, as a result of an attack of bronchitis, and was buried in Glasnevin.

== Legacy ==
The James Fintan Lawlor Commemorative Committee, chaired by David Lawlor was formed in August 2005 to erect a memorial to mark the 200th anniversary of the birth of James Fintan Lalor. €110,000 was raised; Laois County Council provided the site; Irish Life and Permanent sponsored the project; the Department of the Environment provided half the cost. The bronze statue of Lalor holding a pamphlet aloft was sculpted by Mayo-based artist Rory Breslin. The inscription on the limestone plinth reads:

‘Ireland her own, and all therein, from the sod to the sky. The soil of Ireland for the people of Ireland.’

Michael Davitt considered Lalor "the only real Irish revolutionary mind in the '48 period". His ideas were the ideological underpinning of the Irish National League during the Land War.

== Family ==
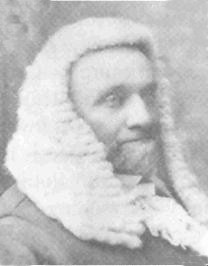
Peter Lalor

James Fintan's brother Richard Lalor born in 1823, became a Young Irelander who later supported Parnell. He was an M.P. for Queen's County from 1880 until 1892. He died in the family home in November 1893.

Peter (1827–1889), James' youngest brother, went to Melbourne in the colony of Victoria, Australia in 1852. In 1854 Peter led immigrant gold miners in an armed uprising at the Eureka Stockade, Ballarat going on to become a Member of the Victorian Legislative Assembly (1856–1887). In 1880 he succeeded Charles Gavan Duffy, who had come out to the colony in 1856, as Speaker of the Assembly. His cousins included Alice Lalor (1768–1846), an early American religious leader, Dr Joseph Lalor (1811–86) an Irish mental health reformer, and Joseph O'Lawlor (1768–1850) a Spanish general.

== Sources ==
Additional reading

- The Politics of Irish Literature: from Thomas Davis to W.B. Yeats, Malcolm Brown, Allen & Unwin, 1973.
- John Mitchel, A Cause Too Many, Aidan Hegarty, Camlane Press.
- Thomas Davis, The Thinker and Teacher, Arthur Griffith, M.H. Gill & Son 1922.
- Brigadier-General Thomas Francis Meagher His Political and Military Career, Capt. W. F. Lyons, Burns Oates & Washbourne Limited 1869
- Young Ireland and 1848, Dennis Gwynn, Cork University Press 1949.
- Daniel O'Connell The Irish Liberator, Dennis Gwynn, Hutchinson & Co, Ltd.
- O'Connell Davis and the Colleges Bill, Dennis Gwynn, Cork University Press 1948.
- Smith O’Brien And The “Secession”, Dennis Gwynn, Cork University Press
- Meagher of The Sword, Edited By Arthur Griffith, M. H. Gill & Son, Ltd. 1916.
- Young Irelander Abroad The Diary of Charles Hart, Edited by Brendan O'Cathaoir, University Press.
- John Mitchel First Felon for Ireland, Edited By Brian O'Higgins, Brian O'Higgins 1947.
- Rossa's Recollections 1838 to 1898, Intro by Sean O'Luing, The Lyons Press 2004.
- Labour in Ireland, James Connolly, Fleet Street 1910.
- The Re-Conquest of Ireland, James Connolly, Fleet Street 1915.
- John Mitchel Noted Irish Lives, Louis J. Walsh, The Talbot Press Ltd 1934.
- Thomas Davis: Essays and Poems, Centenary Memoir, M. H Gill, M.H. Gill & Son, Ltd MCMXLV.
- Life of John Martin, P. A. Sillard, James Duffy & Co., Ltd 1901.
- Life of John Mitchel, P. A. Sillard, James Duffy and Co., Ltd 1908.
- John Mitchel, P. S. O'Hegarty, Maunsel & Company, Ltd 1917.
- The Fenians in Context Irish Politics & Society 1848–82, R. V. Comerford, Wolfhound Press 1998
- William Smith O'Brien and the Young Ireland Rebellion of 1848, Robert Sloan, Four Courts Press 2000
- Irish Mitchel, Seamus MacCall, Thomas Nelson and Sons Ltd 1938.
- Ireland Her Own, T. A. Jackson, Lawrence & Wishart Ltd 1976.
- Life and Times of Daniel O'Connell, T. C. Luby, Cameron & Ferguson.
- Young Ireland, T. F. O'Sullivan, The Kerryman Ltd. 1945.
- Irish Rebel John Devoy and America's Fight for Irish Freedom, Terry Golway, St. Martin's Griffin 1998.
- Paddy's Lament Ireland 1846-1847 Prelude to Hatred, Thomas Gallagher, Poolbeg 1994.
- The Great Shame, Thomas Keneally, Anchor Books 1999.
- James Fintan Lalor, Thomas, P. O'Neill, Golden Publications 2003.
- Charles Gavan Duffy: Conversations With Carlyle (1892), with Introduction, Stray Thoughts On Young Ireland, by Brendan Clifford, Athol Books, Belfast, ISBN 0-85034-114-0. (Pg. 32 Titled, Foster's account Of Young Ireland.)
- Envoi, Taking Leave Of Roy Foster, by Brendan Clifford and Julianne Herlihy, Aubane Historical Society, Cork.
- The Falcon Family, or, Young Ireland, by M. W. Savage, London, 1845. (An Gorta Mor)Quinnipiac University
- "Wolfe Tone Annual", 1939
