= Ellen Mary Patrick Downing =

Irish nationalist, poet, nun

- Born: Ellen Mary Downing; 19 March 1828; Cork, Ireland
- Died: 27 January 1869 (aged 40); Cork, Ireland
- Occupation: writer

Ellen Mary Patrick Downing (19 March 1828 – 27 January 1869), known as Mary of the Nation and E. M. P. D., was an Irish nationalist, poet and nun. She was one of the three chief poets of Irish nationality.

== Biography ==
Born in Cork in 1828, Downing was the daughter of the resident medical officer in Cork Fever Hospital. She wrote for The Nation, submitting over 40 poems which they published and becoming one of the top poets representing Irish Nationalism. She went on to write for the United Irishman until it was suppressed by the Treason Felony Act 1848. She was a member of the Cork Historical Society which is where she met Joseph Brenan, a Young Irelander to whom she became engaged. After disappointment in love however she joined the North Presentation Convent on 14 October 1849. Her new name was Sister Mary Alphonsus. However ill health meant that she did not remain in the convent but lived in her own home though remaining a lay sister. Later she joined the Third Order of St Dominic. George Russell called her a saint and noted that she was much in demand as a religious teacher.

== Selected works ==
=== Poetry collections ===
- Voices of the Heart, ed. Most Rev. J. P. Leahy, Bishop of Dromore, Dublin 1868; enlarged ed., 1880;
- Novenas and Meditations, Leahy ed., Dublin 1879;
- Poems for Children (issued Dublin 1881)
