= Michael Hogan (poet) =

Irish poet (1828–1899)

Michael Hogan (31 October 1828 – 19 April 1899) was an Irish poet. He was known as the "Bard of Thomond".

== Life ==
He was born in Thomondgate, County Limerick. His father was a wheelwright and musician, who also made the flutes and fiddles that he played. He and his family experienced some of the ravages of the Great Irish Famine (1845–1848), about which he wrote later in life. In his early years Hogan worked at Russell's Mill, Lock Quay and later in life with Limerick Corporation. In 1858, he married Ann Lynch. They had no known children.

Hogan's first published works appeared in the Anglo-Celt, then in the Irishman, the Nation, the Munster News, and the Limerick Leader. His first volume of works, Lays and Legends of Thomond, was published in Limerick in 1861. A larger edition, under the same name, was published in Dublin in 1867. He then embarked on issuing a series of satirical publications which lampooned prominent figures in the city. They achieved an enormous circulation and caused a great sensation at the time. He continued publishing similar matter until a new version of his Lays and Legends was published in Dublin in 1880. In 1886, he went to the United States, where he stayed for three years.

A life-size statue of Hogan was erected to his memory at King Johns Castle Plaza in Limerick city in 2005.
