= Thomas MacNevin =

Irish writer and journalist (1814–1848)

Thomas MacNevin (1814 – 8 February 1848) was an influential Irish writer and journalist, who died under "peculiarly sad circumstances" in a Bristol asylum.

According to T. F. O'Sullivan, he was one of the most "brilliant intellects" to be associated with The Nation newspaper and with the Young Ireland movement.

== Background ==
According to the official records of Trinity College, Dublin, which he entered at the age of 17, Thomas MacNevin was born in Dublin, the son of Daniel MacNevin, although it has also been suggested that he was born in Galway. Charles Gavan Duffy in his Young Ireland: a Fragment of Irish History, 1840–45 described MacNevin as being "below the middle size but well made, well poised, and agile" with auburn hair and clear blue eyes, "which he believed he inherited from Danish ancestors." His face was "mobile, and possessed the power not given to one man in ten thousand, of expressing a wide range of feeling without exaggeration or grimace."

== Education ==
During his time at Trinity College, MacNevin became treasurer of the College Historical Society between 1834 and 1835, and auditor in 1837–38. The society had been founded by Edmund Burke nearly a century before, and had trained three generations of Irish orators and statesmen. However, in 1838 the society was exiled from the college that gave it a name. It was during this period that MacNevin became its president.

The meetings were held in Radley's Hotel, and attracted audiences with their vehement and flamboyant eloquence. Isaac Butt, Joseph Lefanu, Torrens M'Cullagh, Thomas Wallis, James O'Hea, William Keogh, and Joseph Pollock all debated in a style reminiscent of that of the old Irish Parliament. At Trinity College, MacNevin studied elocution under John Vandenhoff and Sheridan Knowles. He completed his degree in 1838, and was called to the Bar the following year.

== Career ==
In 1844, MacNevin edited the State Trials, and later he wrote two volumes for the Young Ireland "Library of Ireland". The first, a History of the Irish Volunteers of 1782, was published in 1845, followed by The Confiscation of Ulster in 1846. In 1845, he published Gerald, a three-act play on the invasion of Ireland by Henry II in 1171. Also in this year he edited and published The speeches of the Right Honourable Richard Lalor Sheil. MacNevin contributed to the Northern Catholic newspaper The Vindicator.

MacNevin worked on The Nation newspaper of the Young Ireland group for two years. He felt the death of Davis in 1845 keenly, and in the last remaining years of his life was mentally affected.

== Death ==
MacNevin died on 8 February 1848 in an asylum in Bristol. On 19 February, The Nation paid a tribute to their former colleague and friend.

== Works ==
- MacNevin, Thomas (1845). The History of the Volunteers of 1782 (4th ed.). Dublin: James Duffy.
