= United Irishman (1848 newspaper) =

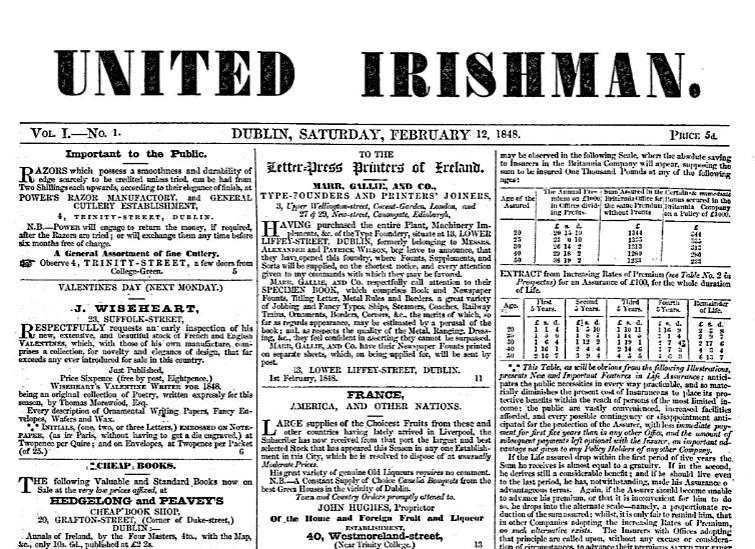
- Type: weekly newspaper
- Founded: 12 February 1848
- Political alignment: Irish nationalism
- Language: English
- Headquarters: Dublin

The United Irishman was a nationalist weekly newspaper published by John Mitchel in Dublin in 1848. It was suppressed by the British Government after just three months, following Mitchel's conviction for treason felony.

== Background ==
In 1845, John Mitchel joined the "Young Ireland" writers contributing to Charles Gavan Duffy's weekly The Nation. When in 1846, after rising tensions they broke with Daniel O'Connell and his more clericalist and compromising supporters in the Repeal Association, Mitchel joined them in forming Irish Confederation. But Mitchel soon occasioned a further split.

Duffy was appalled when, under Mitchel's temporary editorship, The Nation, a journal "recognised throughout the world as the mouthpiece of Irish rights", lent itself to "the monstrous task of applauding negro slavery and of denouncing the emancipation of the Jews." Embracing the illiberal and racial views of Thomas Carlyle, Mitchel had claimed that slavery, which Britain was suppressing in the Atlantic, was "the best state of existence for the negro".

Before relations could be repaired, at the end of 1847 Mitchel resigned his position as leader writer on The Nation to launch his own paper. He later explained that, in the light of "the famine policy of the Government", he had come to regard as "absolutely necessary a more vigorous policy against the English Government" than that which Duffy, William Smith O'Brien and other Young Ireland leaders were willing to pursue. He "had watched the progress of the famine policy of the Government, and could see nothing in it but a machinery, deliberately devised, and skilfully worked, for the entire subjugation of the island—the slaughter of portion of the people, and the pauperization of the rest," and had "come to the conclusion that the whole system ought to be met with resistance at every point."

== History ==
From his office at 12 Trinity Street, Dublin, Mitchel printed and published the first issue of the United Irishman on 12 February 1848. Other Young Ireland contributors included John Martin, Thomas Devin Reilly and the nationalist Roman Catholic priest, John Kenyon. The paper declared:

That the Irish people had a distinct and indefeasible right to their country, and to all the moral and material wealth and resources thereof, ... as a distinct Sovereign State ...;

That the property of the farmers and labourers of Ireland is as sacred as the property of all the noblemen and gentlemen in Ireland, and also immeasurably more valuable;

That the custom called ‘Tenant Right,’ which prevails partially in the North of Ireland, is a just and salutary custom both for North and South ...;

That every man in Ireland who shall hereafter pay taxes for the support of the State, shall have a just right to an equal voice with every other man in the government ...

That all ‘legal and constitutional agitation’ in Ireland is a delusion;

That every freeman, and every man who desired to become free, ought to have arms, and to practise the use of them.

That no combination of classes in Ireland is desirable, just, or possible, save on the terms of the rights of the industrious classes being acknowledged and secured; [and]

That no good thing can come from the English Parliament, or the English Government.

In the first editorial, addressed to "The Right Hon. the Earl of Clarendon, Englishman, calling himself Her Majesty's Lord Lieutenant – General and General Governor of Ireland," Mitchel stated that the purpose of the journal was to resume the struggle which had been waged by Wolfe Tone and Robert Emmet, the Holy War to sweep this Island clear of the English name and nation." Lord Clarendon was also addressed as "Her Majesty's Executioner-General and General Butcher of Ireland".

Commenting on this first edition of The United Irishman, Lord Stanley in the House of Lords, on 24 February 1848, maintained that the paper pursued "the purpose of exciting sedition and rebellion among her Majesty's subjects in Ireland..., and to promote civil war for the purpose of exterminating every Englishman in Ireland". The publishers were "rebels at heart, and they are rebels avowed, who are in earnest in what they say and propose to do".

On 15 April 1848, a grand jury indicted not only Mitchel, but also his former associates on the Nation O'Brien and Thomas Francis Meagher for "seditious libels". When the capital cases against O'Brien and Meagher fell through, thanks in part to Isaac Butt's able defence, under new legislation the government replaced the charges against Mitchel with Treason Felony punishable by transportation for life. To justify the severity of the new measures, the Home Secretary, Sir George Grey, thought it sufficient to read extracts from Mitchel's articles and speeches. Mitchel was convicted on 26 May 1848, and was sentenced to 14 years transportation to Van Diemen's Land.

Just 16 editions of The United Irishman had been produced. The last was on 27 May. It included Mitchel's final contribution, penned in Newgate Prison.

The game is afoot, at last. The liberty of Ireland may come sooner or come later, by peaceful negotiation or bloody conflict— but it is sure; and wherever between the poles I may chance to be, I will hear the crash of the down fall of the thrice-accursed British Empire."

The Government seized the printing presses. In June, Mitchel's friend John Martin printed and published The Irish Felon, from the same Dublin office, honouring subscriptions to its predecessor. On 18 August 1848 Martin suffered the same fate as Mitchel. He was sentenced to 10 years transportation to Van Diemen's Land.
