= Hugh Heinrick =

Hugh Heinrick (also known as Hugh Henrick) (1831–1877) was a journalist and teacher and a campaigner for Home Rule in Ireland. He was born in Caim near Enniscorthy in County Wexford, Ireland and his surname suggests that he may have been a member of the German Palatine community that settled in the area in the early 18th century. Some time in the mid-19th century, Heinrick moved to mainland Britain, first to Kirkcudbrightshire in Scotland and then to the Aston district of Birmingham, where he settled and worked as a schoolmaster. He was very much involved in the Irish Home Rule movement in the late 19th century, being Secretary to the Irish Home Rule MPs during the General Election of 1874 in which the Home Rule League won 59 seats. He was a frequent speaker at public meetings about Irish Home Rule and wrote a number of newspaper articles on the subject. In 1871, he was Editor of the 'Irish Vindicator', the first newspaper for Irish migrants in London, although it was not a success and closed after only four months.

In 1872, he published a series of articles titled: "A Survey of the Irish in England" in ‘The Nation’, a patriotic Irish newspaper published in Dublin. In this work, he examined the lives of the Irish immigrants who had settled in mainland Britain in terms of their numbers, their occupations and their social and political status. These articles were collated and re-published in 1990 by Alan O’Day. In 1874, Heinrick followed his newspaper articles with "What is Home Rule?" and in 1882 with "The Irish in England", both published by John Denvir.

In 1874, a general election returned 59 MPs who were part of the Home Rule League, making it the third largest group in the British parliament at the time. On 5 September 1874, ‘The Nation’ carried a report of a "complimentary dinner" to Mr Hugh Heinrick, Secretary to the Irish Home Rule MPs. Isaac Butt, leader of the Parliamentary Home Rule League, presided and was supported by "many members of Parliament".

In 1875, he was the first Editor of the ‘United Irishman’, the newspaper of the Irish Home Rule Confederation. He is mentioned in John Denvir's "The Life Story of an Old Rebel" where he is described as “an able journalist” and “a brilliant writer”.

Hugh Heinrick died in Birmingham on 7 October 1877 after a long period of illness.
