= John Kenyon (priest) =

Irish Catholic priest and nationalist

Father John Kenyon
- Born: 1 May 1812; Limerick, Ireland
- Died: 1869 (aged 56–57)
- Education: St Patrick's College, Maynooth
- Occupations: Catholic priest and Irish nationalist
- Movement: Young Ireland, Irish Confederation
- Opponent: Daniel O'Connell

John Kenyon (1812–1869) was an Irish Catholic priest and nationalist, who was involved in the Young Ireland movement and the Irish Confederation. He was renowned for his strong political and religious views which alienated him from many of his colleagues, and resulted in his being twice suspended from clerical duties. In particular, Kenyon was known for his opposition to the Irish political leader, Daniel O'Connell. Kenyon advocated the use of force to achieve political goals and refused to condemn slavery.

== Early life ==
John Kenyon was born to Patrick Kenyon and Mary McMahon on 1 May 1812, at Thomondgate, Limerick City, Ireland. The family lived a comfortable existence as John's father ran a successful stonecutting business, a public house and a grocery shop. Five of the six Kenyon children entered religious life. Kenyon entered Maynooth Seminary in 1829 – the year of Catholic Emancipation. He was ordained to the priesthood six years later and immediately became actively involved in politics. His first appointment was to Ennis, County Clare, where he published a scholarly pamphlet, entitled "A discourse on the use and history of Christian Churches". From there he was transferred to Silvermines, County Tipperary, where he initiated a major 'Buy Irish' campaign. He was also deeply involved in the Temperance Movement under the leadership of Father Mathew. In 1842 Kenyon was transferred to Templederry where he spent the remainder of his life. When the Young Ireland party was established in that year, he was instantly attracted to their policies.

== The Great Famine ==
The severity of the Great Famine led Kenyon to blame the entire event on the British. He used his Sunday sermon to advise his congregation to teach their children to hate everything British. Nonetheless, throughout the famine he worked tirelessly as a member of the Dolla & Killeneave and the Templederry & Latteragh relief committees. Apart from normal relief measures, Kenyon also established his own work scheme, whereby he employed locals to build a wall around his property. John Kenyon built Chapel House during the famine. Visitors to the house included James Fintan Lalor, John Mitchel's family, John Martin, John Blake Dillon, Thomas Clark Luby, Thomas Francis Meagher, James Stephens and many other important figures of the day. It was demolished in November 1986.

== Advocacy of physical force ==
It was quite extraordinary that a Catholic priest should promote physical force. But Kenyon was prepared to defend his views. In an article in The Limerick Reporter, he stated that no law, civil or ecclesiastical, made blood-shedding a crime. He noted that it was practiced by the Jews "under the immediate direction of the Almighty." The Fifth Commandment ("Thou shalt not kill"), he suggested, only forbade "unjust blood-shedding". He went on to point out that there were soldiers among the first believers in Christ, and their faith was not weak. He stated that no political right was ever won in Ireland by moral force. The moral force which won Catholic Emancipation was laced with a fear of impending physical force: "It was not a mere spiritual phantasm divested of flesh and blood and divorced from the substratum of physical energy, so essential to its vigour, its vitality, and its effect. The moral force which won Emancipation was a firmly expressed demand for justice of resolute men; it was an overflowing treasury of the Catholic Association, every shilling of which stood for two stout arms and one brave heart".

== Opposition to O'Connell ==
The scale of the Great Famine, coupled with his belief that the British government was not doing enough to alleviate the hardship, led him to despise not only the British but also Daniel O'Connell. He believed that "the Liberator" (as O'Connell was known) was playing into the hands of the government. He wrote of O'Connell's leadership: "We have been guided, step by step, self-hoodwinked to such an abyss of physical and moral misery – to such a condition of helpless and hopeless degradation, as no race of mankind was ever plunged in since the creation. We are a nation of beggars – mean, shameless, and lying beggars. And this is where O'Connell has guided us." Kenyon believed that a leader should be truthful and honest. He felt that he should express his convictions – whether positive or negative – and not remain silent "from a silly apprehension of the consequences." He went on to emphasise the necessity of a leader being conscientious: "God gave everyone the gift of reason and it should be used. Conscience promotes honesty and openness. A conscientious leader rejects hypocrisy. Conscience spurns hypocrisy as a substitute for that truth for which it instinctively yearns." He suggested that a democratic, rather than dictatorial, attitude would accept varying viewpoints and that unanimity could rarely be achieved because of "the constitution of the human mind, with all its faculties." Therefore, the leader should have tolerance and understanding. He believed O'Connell lacked both of those qualities. When O'Connell died in May 1847 Kenyon wrote to The Nation criticising expressions of sympathy offered by the Young Irelanders. He questioned how they could have condemned him weeks previously, and yet eulogise him when he died. He stated that O'Connell's death was no loss to the Irish nation. He went on: "On the contrary, I think that Mr. O'Connell has been doing before his death, and was likely to continue doing so long as he might live, very grievous injury to Ireland; so that I account his death rather a gain than a loss to this country."

== Young Ireland ==
Despite the embarrassment caused by his criticism of O'Connell, Kenyon was of immense importance to the Young Ireland movement. Because the leadership consisted of Protestants and Presbyterians, as well as Catholics, the party was not trusted by the Catholic hierarchy. (The Catholic clergy almost totally supported O'Connell and the Repeal Association.) Kenyon was the Young Ireland polemicist, and was seen in party circles as the person to win the support of the Catholic population. When John Mitchel was transported in 1848 Kenyon immediately replaced him as the radical extremist of the party. He visited Charles Gavan Duffy, along with Terence Bellew MacManus, and suggested the reorganisation of the Irish Confederation into a secret society, capable of acting as a quasi government in the event of a rising. The suggestion was acted upon and the Confederation was disbanded. John Kenyon's involvement in the preparation for war caused serious concerns for his religious superiors. When in April 1848, he encouraged a crowd of ten thousand people at Templederry to arm themselves, Dr Kennedy immediately suspended him from clerical duties. He was presented with an ultimatum to either give up politics or be expelled from the priesthood. A compromise was arrived at whereby he agreed that he would not involve himself in the rising unless he considered that there was a reasonable chance of success. Unfortunately he did not explain this constraint to his colleagues – a fact that caused much misunderstanding and anger as the Confederates assembled in Ballingarry, County Tipperary, a few weeks later. On Thursday 27 July as the Confederates assembled at Ballingarry, William Smith O'Brien dispatched Thomas Francis Meagher, John Blake Dillon, and Maurice Leyne to Templederry, to request Father Kenyon to lead out his men. It was intended that Kenyon's leadership would extend the rising to North Tipperary and into Limerick where Richard O'Gorman was awaiting orders. Kenyon's response was unexpected. He refused, stating that he was not prepared to become involved in "a bootless struggle." Later he wrote in the parish register: "This evening I have heard of a rebellion in South Tipperary under the leadership of William Smith O'Brien – may God speed it."

== The Three Johns ==
The 'Three Johns' – Mitchel, Kenyon and Martin – were a most unlikely trio. John Mitchel was a Presbyterian, and the son of a Unitarian minister who had been a United Irishman in the 1790s. John Martin, also a Presbyterian, from County Down, had a family background of opposition to the Irish Rebellion of 1798. John Kenyon, a Catholic curate based in Templederry, County Tipperary, expounded the merits of physical force, as opposed to the moral force ideal espoused by Daniel O'Connell. The Young Ireland movement brought the three together in a friendship that lasted a lifetime. Prior to his transportation, John Mitchel was a regular visitor to the mountains of Tipperary. His wife, Jenny, and her children visited Templederry and spent six months at Chapel House in 1848. A few years later Kenyon accompanied them to England, as they commenced their long journey of reunification with their loved one. John Martin was a regular guest of Father Kenyon. The views of all three men were similar, with Mitchel and Kenyon very strong in their refusal to condemn slavery. Kenyon earned himself the title of "Slave tolerating priest from Tipperary". All three were committed to physical force as a means of attaining freedom. After 1848 they met on three occasions in Paris. The final meeting was in 1866. The resulting portrait of the "Three Johns" marked the occasion. As Kenyon and Martin returned home, Mitchel remarked: "Well, I feel melancholy; poor Father Kenyon! He is going rapidly. I bade him good-bye today – something tells me he and I shall never meet on this side of the grave." Within three years Kenyon was dead.

== Slavery ==
Kenyon was known as "the slave tolerating priest from Tipperary", due to his constant refusal to condemn slavery. His views initially came to light when the Irish Confederation was discussing the issue of donations from America. He maintained that regardless of their origin, all donations should be accepted. The issue arose when James Haughton, a Quaker, and a strong moral force campaigner, insisted that the new organisation should be totally committed not only to anti-slavery but to teetotalism and the abolition of capital punishment. Haughton stated that he "would indignantly refuse the bloodstained contributions of American slaveholders." Kenyon, however, suggested that to refuse such subscriptions would be erroneous. In response he used the analogy of being selective in accepting help in the case of a drowning. He wondered if a drowning person was offered help by an undesirable, "would he spurn the offer, spit in the decent man's face and choose rather to feed a pair of crocodiles, from sheer virtuous indignation?" He made it quite clear what he himself would do with such subscriptions: "It is quite an error to suppose that our great and noble cause would be polluted by receiving such contributions, or that it must not be injured by rejecting them. I would accept their aid, and thank them for it, to repeal this abominable Union". He refused to condemn slavery on the basis that the scriptures did not condemn it, and the Catholic Church never defined it as a crime: "Priests and bishops owned slaves, and perhaps in some areas the practice continues. It may be that slaveholding will be eliminated from Christendom by a fashionable theory of developments. It may be that it will vanish from the earth more naturally. It may be too that it will not. The coil is tangled, I apprehend." His continued: "We are all slaves in a thousand senses of the word – slaves to time, to space, to circumstance, to the whims of our maternal ancestors in all their nonsensical generations; to fire, air, earth and water. If to all these slaveries there be added one other – namely, slavery to slaveholders – I cannot see that our position will be essentially deteriorated." He compared American slavery to the oppression of the Irish people: "If it is true that they [slave holders] maltreat their negroes half as much as our poor Irish slaves are maltreated by their English masters, may God forgive them. For their transgressions, at the worse, shall no more convince the slavery system of evil, than the cruelty of exterminating landlords shall prove that the condition of tenant farming is unchristian, or profligacy in family relations, that the marriage state is unholy." He concluded that "flinging back bags of dollars over the Atlantic ocean into the pockets of these slaveholders, enriching them at our expense, is such a Utopian remedy for the supposed evil as only homoeopathists could countenance." He advised those who disagreed with his views to mind their own business, wait until the Union was repealed, and then when Irish problems were solved it may be appropriate to "set about abating it with our surplus funds".
