= Young Ireland =

19th-century Irish nationalist movement

- Irish tricolour raised in the Young Ireland rebellion 1848
- Founded: 1842
- Dissolved: 1849
- Preceded by: Repeal Association
- Succeeded by: Tenant Right League, Irish Republican Brotherhood
- Newspaper: The Nation
- Ideology: Irish nationalism Liberalism; Radicalism; Land reform
- Political position: Left-wing
- National affiliation: Repeal Association (1842–1847); Irish Confederation (1847–1848)
- Colours: Green, white and orange
- Slogan: A Nation Once Again

Young Ireland (Irish: Éire Óg, IPA: [ˈeːɾʲə ˈoːɡ]) was a political and cultural movement in the 1840s committed to an all-Ireland struggle for independence and democratic reform. Grouped around the Dublin weekly The Nation, it took issue with the compromises and clericalism of the larger national movement, Daniel O'Connell's Repeal Association, from which it seceded in 1847. Despairing, in the face of the Great Famine, of any other course, in 1848 Young Irelanders attempted an insurrection. Following the arrest and the exile of most of their leading figures, the movement split between those who carried the commitment to "physical force" forward into the Irish Republican Brotherhood, and those who sought to build a "League of North and South" linking an independent Irish parliamentary party to tenant agitation for land reform.

== Origins ==
=== The Historical Society ===
Many of those later identified as Young Ireland first gathered in 1839 at a reconvening of the College Historical Society in Dublin. The club at Trinity College had a history, stretching back through the student participation of the United Irishmen Theobald Wolfe Tone and Robert Emmet to Edmund Burke, of debating patriotic motions. Not for the first time, the club had been expelled from college for breaching the condition that it not discuss questions of "modern politics".

Those present for meeting in the chambers of Francis Kearney were, in Irish terms, a "mixed" group. They included Catholics (first admitted to Trinity in 1793), among them Thomas MacNevin, elected the Society's president, and (later to follow him in that role) John Blake Dillon. Chief among the other future Young Irelanders present were law graduate Thomas Davis, and the Newry attorney John Mitchel.

=== The Repeal Association ===
With others present, these four would go to join Daniel O'Connell's Repeal Association. In 1840 this was a relaunch of a campaign to restore an Irish parliament in Dublin by repealing the 1800 Acts of Union. O'Connell had suspended Repeal agitation in the 1830s to solicit favour and reform from Whig ministry of Lord Melbourne.

In April 1841 O’Connell placed both Davis and Dillon on the Association's General Committee with responsibilities for organisation and recruitment. Membership uptake had been slow.

In the south and west, the great numbers of tenant farmers, small-town traders and journeymen O'Connell had rallied to the cause of Emancipation in the 1820s did not similarly respond to his lead on the more abstract proposition of Repeal. Patriotic and republican sentiment among the Presbyterians of the north-east had surrendered, since the Rebellion of 1798, to the conviction that the union with Great Britain was both the occasion for their relative prosperity and a guarantee of their liberty. Protestants were now, as a body, opposed to a restoration of the parliament in Dublin whose prerogatives they had once championed. In these circumstances, the Catholic gentry and much of the middle class were content to explore the avenues for advancement opened by Emancipation and earlier "Catholic relief". The suspicion, in any case, was that O'Connell's purpose in returning to the constitutional question was merely to embarrass the incoming Conservatives (under his old enemy Sir Robert Peel) and to hasten the Whigs return.

In working with O'Connell, Thomas and Dillon contended with a patriarch "impatient of opposition or criticism, and apt to prefer followers to colleagues". They found an ally in Charles Gavan Duffy, editor in Belfast of the Repeal journal The Vindicator.

== The Nation ==
Charles Gavan Duffy

Duffy proposed a new national weekly to Davis and Dillon, owned by himself but directed by all three. The paper first appeared in October in 1842 bearing the title chosen for it by Davis, The Nation, after the French liberal-opposition daily Le National. The prospectus, written by Davis, dedicated the paper "to direct the popular mind and the sympathies of educated men of all parties to the great end of [a] nationality" that will "not only raise our people from their poverty, by securing to them the blessings of a domestic legislature, but inflame and purify them with a lofty and heroic love of country".

The Nation was an immediate publishing success. Its sales soared above all other Irish papers, weekly or daily. Circulation at its height was reckoned to be close to a quarter of a million. With its focus upon editorials, historical articles and verse, all intended to shape public opinion, copies continued to be read in Repeal Reading Rooms and to be passed from hand to hand long after their current news value had faded. It may have been a "reinforcement for which O’Connell had scarcely dared to hope", but the journal's role in the revived fortunes of the Repeal Association has to be weighed against other contributions. Legislative independence was powerfully endorsed by Archbishop McHale of Tuam.

Beyond Davis and Dillon's Historical Society companions, the paper drew on a widening circle of contributors. Among the more politically committed these included: the Repeal MP William Smith O'Brien; Tithe War veteran James Fintan Lalor; prose and verse writer Michael Doheny; author of Traits and Stories of the Irish Peasantry, William Carleton; militant-nationalist priest, John Kenyon; poet and early suffragist Jane Wilde; republican and labour-rights activist Thomas Devin Reilly; former American journalist (and future "Father of the Canadian Confederation") Thomas D'Arcy McGee; and the renowned Repeal orator Thomas Francis Meagher.

It was an English journalist who first applied to this growing circle the label "Young Ireland". Although there was no direct connection, the reference was to Giuseppe Mazzini's insurrectionist, anti-clerical, Young Italy, and to other European national-republican movements (Young Germany, Young Poland... ) that Mazzini had sought loosely to federate under the aegis of "Young Europe" (Giovine Europa). When O'Connell picked up on the moniker and began referring to those he had considered his junior lieutenants as "Young Irelanders" it was a signal for an impending break.

== Conflicts with O'Connell ==
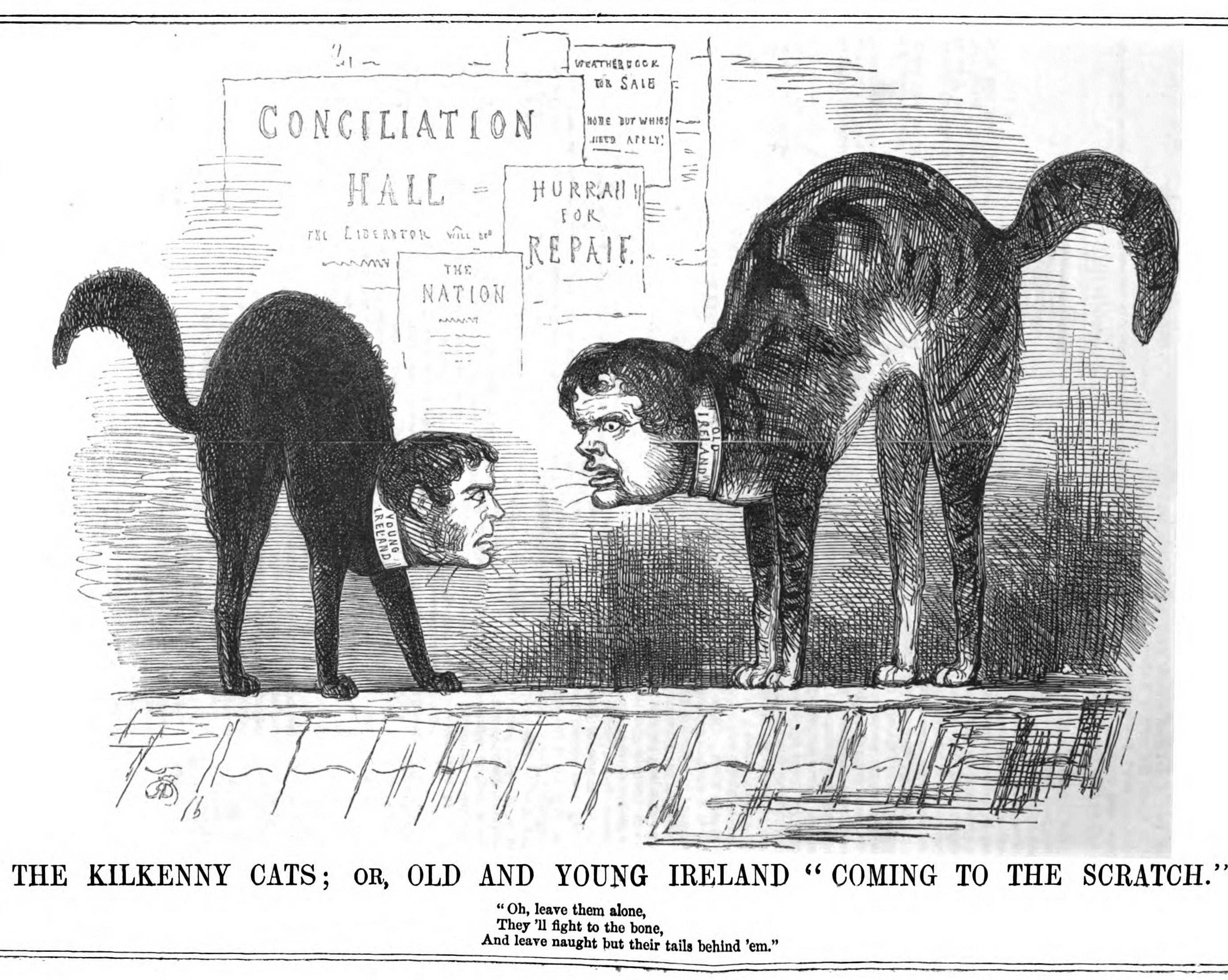
Depiction of Young Ireland (Smith O'Brien) and Old Ireland (O'Connell) fighting like two Kilkenny cats (Punch, 1846)

=== Retreat from Repeal ===
The Nation was loyal to O'Connell when, in October 1843, he stood down the Repeal movement at Clontarf. The government had deployed troops and artillery to enforce a ban on what O'Connell had announced as the last "monster meeting" in the Year of Repeal. (In August at the Hill of Tara crowds had been estimated in the hostile reporting of The Times at close to a million). O'Connell submitted at once. He cancelled the rally and sent out messengers to turn back the approaching crowds.

Although in Duffy's view, the decision deprived the Repeal movement of "half its dignity and all of its terror", the Young Irelanders acknowledged that the risk of a massacre on many times the scale of "Peterloo" was unacceptable. Pressing what they imagined was their advantage, the government had O'Connell, his son John and Duffy convicted of sedition. When after three months (the charges quashed on appeal to the House of Lords) they were released, it was Davis and O'Brien who staged O'Connell's triumphal reception in Dublin.

The first sign of a breach came when, through an open letter in The Nation, Duffy pressed O'Connell to affirm Repeal as his object. While insisting he would "never ask for or work" for anything less than an independent legislature, O'Connell had suggested he might accept a "subordinate parliament" (an Irish legislature with powers devolved from Westminster) as "an instalment".

A further, and more serious, rift opened with Davis. Davis had himself been negotiating the possibility of a devolved parliament with the Northern reformer William Sharman Crawford. The difference with O'Connell was that Davis was seeking a basis for compromise, in the first instance, not at Westminster but in Belfast.

=== Protestant inclusion ===
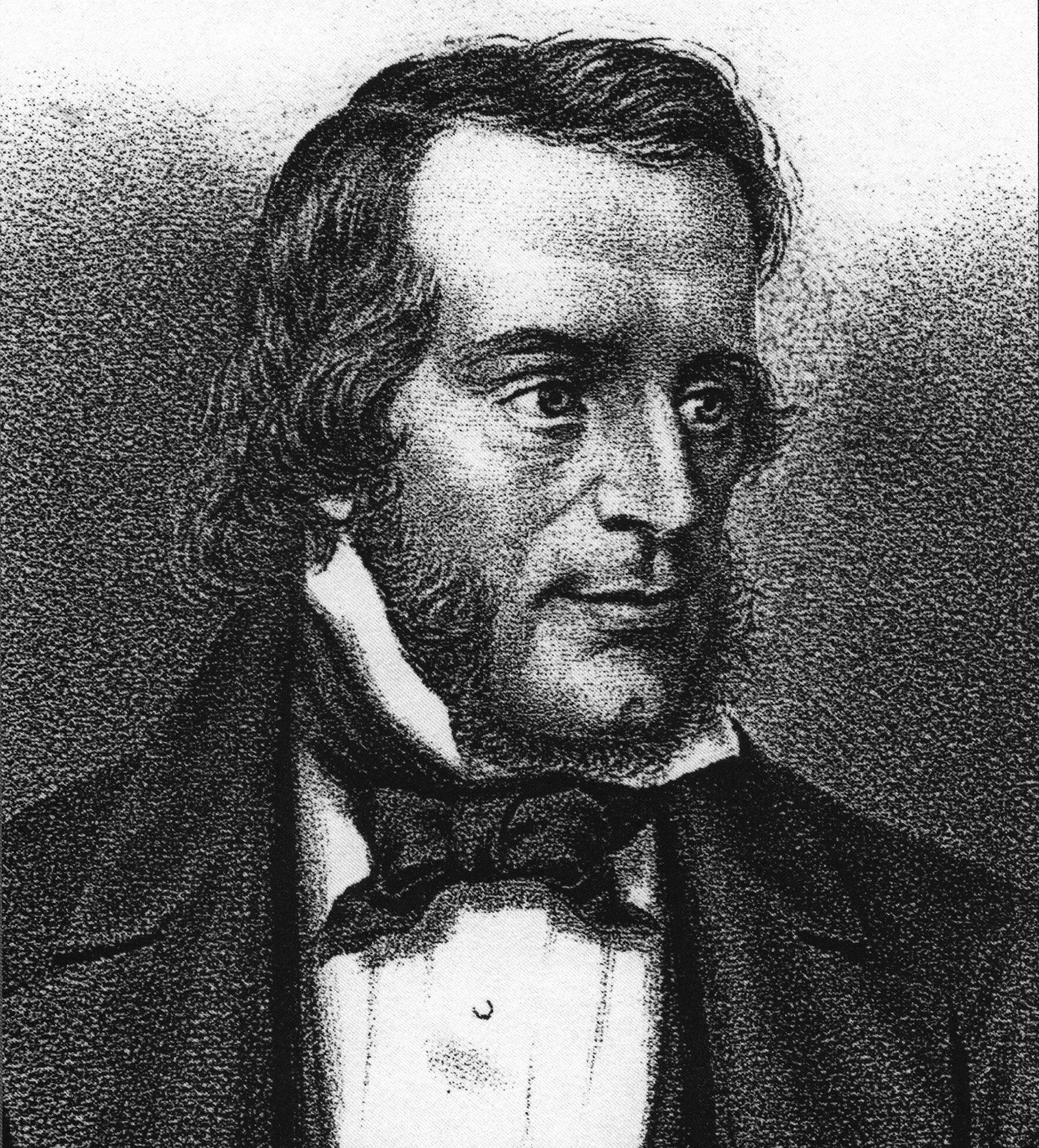
Thomas Davis

When he first followed O'Connell, Duffy concedes that he had "burned with the desire to set up again the Celtic race and the catholic church". In The Nation he subscribed to a broader vision. In the journal's prospectus, Davis wrote of a "nationality" as ready to embrace "the stranger who is within our gates" as "the Irishman of a hundred generations".

Davis (conscious of his family's Cromwellian origin) was persuaded by Johann Gottfried von Herder: nationality was not a matter of ancestry or blood but of acclimatising influences. Cultural traditions, and above all language, "the organ of thought", could engender in persons of diverse origin common national feeling.

Davis was a keen promoter of the Irish language in print, at a time when, while still the speech of the vast majority of the Irish people, it had been all but abandoned by the educated classes. Such cultural nationalism did not appear to interest to O'Connell. There is no evidence that he saw the preservation or revival of his mother tongue, or any other aspect of "native culture", as essential to his political demands. His own paper, the Pilot, recognised but one "positive and unmistakable" marker of the national distinction between English and Irish—religion.

O'Connell "treasured his few Protestant Repealers", but he acknowledged the central role of the Catholic clergy in his movement and guarded the bond it represented. In 1812/13 he had refused emancipation conditioned on Rome having to seek royal assent in the appointment of Irish bishops. Throughout much of the country the bishops and their priests were the only figures of standing independent of the government around which a national movement could organise. It was a reality on which the Repeal Association, like the Catholic Association before it, was built.

In 1845 O'Connell, in advance of the bishops, denounced a "mixed" non-denominational scheme for tertiary education. The Anglicans could retain Trinity in Dublin; the Presbyterians might have the Queens College proposed for Belfast; but the Queens colleges intended for Galway and Cork had to be Catholic. When Davis (moved to tears in the controversy) pleaded that "reasons for separate education are reasons for [a] separate life", O'Connell accused him of suggesting it a "crime to be a Catholic". "I am", he declared, "for Old Ireland, and I have some slight notion that Old Ireland will stand by me".

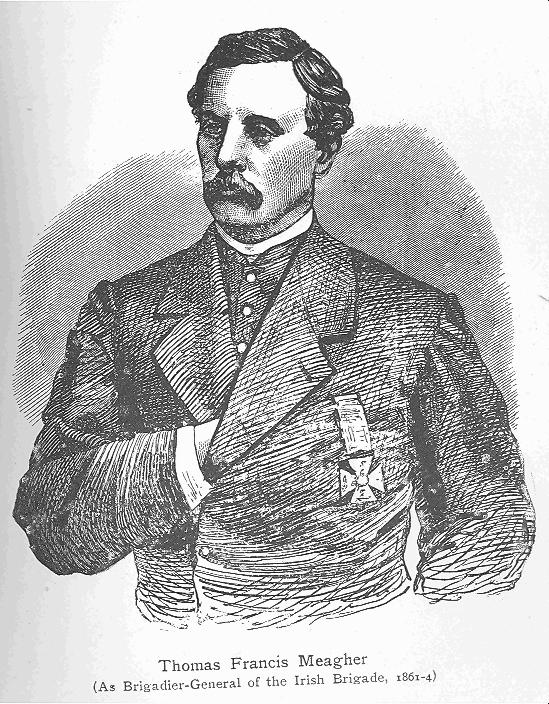
Thomas Francis Meagher

O'Connell rarely joined the Young Irelanders in invoking the memory of 1798, the union of "Catholic, Protestant and Dissenter". His one Repeal foray to the Presbyterian north (to Belfast), organised by Duffy in 1841, was cut short by hostile demonstrations. For the key to an Irish parliament, O'Connell looked to liberal England, not Protestant Ulster. Once a parliament restored to Dublin had retired their distinctive privileges, he was content to suggest that Protestants would, "with little delay, melt into the overwhelming majority of the Irish nation".

=== Whig concessions ===
Thomas Davis's sudden death in 1845 helped close the matter. But his friends suspected that behind the vehemence with which O'Connell opposed Davis on the colleges question there also the intent, again, to frustrate Peel and to advantage the Whigs. This was not a strategy, Meagher argued, that had paid national dividends. The last concession wrung from the Melbourne administration, the 1840 municipal reform, had elected O'Connell to the Lord Mayoralty of Dublin (Dublin's first Catholic mayor since James II). But with the Grand Jury system of county government untouched, it left the great majority of people to continue under the local tyranny of the landlords. In return for allowing a "corrupt gang of politicians who fawned on O'Connell" an extensive system of political patronage, the Irish people being "purchased back into factious vassalage".

In June 1846 the Whigs, under Lord John Russell, returned to office. Immediately they set about dismantling Peel's limited, but practical, efforts to relieve the gathering Irish Famine. Barricaded behind laissez-faire doctrines of "political economy", the government left O'Connell to plead for his country from the floor of the House of Commons: "She is in your hands—in your power. If you do not save her, she cannot save herself. One-fourth of her population will perish unless Parliament comes to their relief". A broken man, on the advice of his doctors O'Connell took himself to the continent where, on route to Rome, he died in May 1847.

=== The Peace Resolutions ===
James Fintan Lalor

In the months before O'Connell's death, Duffy circulated letters received from James Fintan Lalor. In these Lalor argued independence could be pursued only in a popular struggle for the land. This alone could bring about a union of North and South, without which separation from England was impossible to contemplate. But recognising that "any and all means" that employed in this struggle could be made "illegal by Act of Parliament", the Young Irelanders would have, at the very least, to ready themselves for a "moral insurrection". He proposed that they should begin with a campaign to withhold rent, but more might be implied. Parts of the country were already in a state of semi-insurrection. Tenants conspirators, in tradition of the Whiteboys and Ribbonmen, were attacking process servers, intimidating land agents, and resisting evictions. Lalor advised only against a general uprising: the people, he believed, could not hold their own against the country's English garrison.

The letters made a profound impression, particularly on John Mitchel and Father John Kenyon. When the conservative Standard observed that the new Irish railways could be used to transport troops to quickly curb agrarian unrest, Mitchel responded that the tracks could be turned into pikes and trains ambushed. O’Connell publicly distanced himself from The Nation, appearing to some to set Duffy, as the editor, up for prosecution. When the courts failed to convict, O'Connell pressed the issue, seemingly intent on effecting a break.

In July 1846, the Repeal Association tabled resolutions declaring that under no circumstances was a nation justified in asserting its liberties by force of arms. Meagher argued that while the Young Irelanders were not advocating physical force, if Repeal could not be carried by moral persuasion and peaceful means they believed a resort to arms would be a no less honourable course. In his O'Connell's absence, his son John forced the decision: the resolution was carried on the threat of the O'Connells themselves quitting the Association.

An offer by United Irish veteran, Valentine Lawless (Lord Cloncurry) to chair a committee to adjust the dispute between Old and Young Ireland had been rejected by John O'Connell in reportedly "very saucy and unbecoming language". An offer of mediation from the abolitionist and pacifist James Haughton was also spurned.

== The Irish Confederation ==
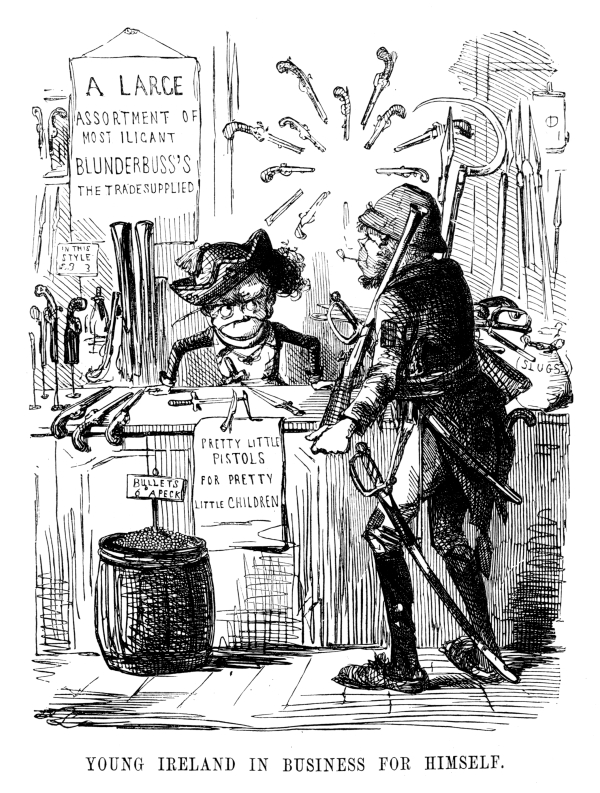
Depiction in Punch (1846) of the split: "Young Ireland in Business for Himself", Smith O'Brien in Repeal cap sells weapons to a stereotyped Irishman.

=== Secession ===
The Young Irelanders withdrew from the Repeal Association, but not without considerable support. In October 1846, the Association chairman in Dublin was presented with a remonstrance protesting Young Irelanders exclusion signed by fifteen hundred of the city's leading citizens. When John O’Connell ordered this to be flung into the gutter, a large protest meeting was held, suggesting the possibility for a rival organisation. In January 1847, the seceders formed themselves as the Irish Confederation. Michael Doheny recalls "no declarations or calls for rebellion, and no pledges [given] of peace". The objectives were "independence of the Irish nation" with "no means to attain that end abjured, save such as were inconsistent with honour, morality and reason".

=== In the shadow of the Famine ===
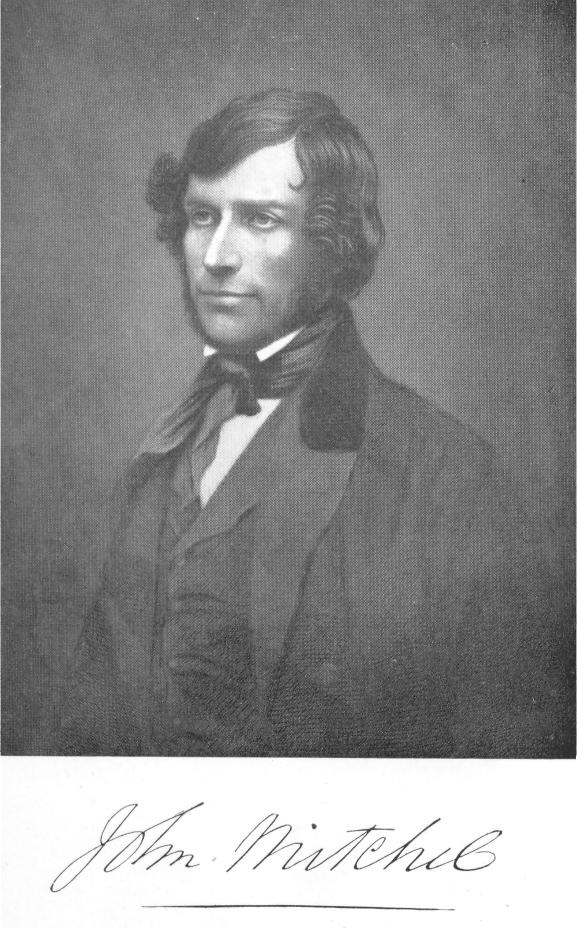
John Mitchel

As first directed by Duffy, in towns Confederate clubs were to encourage the use of Irish resources and manufactures, work for the extension of popular franchise, and instruct youth in the history of their country which was being kept from them in the government's National Schools. The village clubs were to promote the rights of tenants and labourers, diffuse knowledge of agriculture and—in token of the continuing commitment to non-violence—discourage secret societies. All were to promote harmony between Irishmen of all creeds, making it a point to invite the participation of Protestants. But in "Black '47", the worst year of the potato-blight famine, the search was for policies that could address the immediate crisis.

The Confederation urged cultivators to hold the harvest until the needs of their own families were supplied. As Duffy was later to acknowledge, the poorest had lost the art and means of preparing for themselves anything other than the potato. Even were it not at the cost of eviction, holding back grain and other foodstuffs grown to pay rent might avail them little. As "temporary relief for destitute persons", in the spring of 1847 the government opened soup kitchens. In August they were shut. The starving were directed to abandon the land and apply to the workhouses.

Mitchel urged the Confederation to pronounce for Lalor's policy and make control of land the issue. However, Duffy had cut Michel's access to the leader columns of The Nation' over a seemingly extraneous issue. In Duffy's view, Mitchel had abused a temporary editorship to take unsanctioned and, in themselves, scandalous positions on matters that had been sacrosanct to O'Connell. O'Connell had repeatedly assailed what he described as "the vile union" in the United States "of republicanism and slavery". He had also criticised Pope Gregory XVI over the treatment of Jews in the Papal States. Conscious of the risk to American funding and support, Duffy himself had difficulty with O'Connell's vocal abolitionism: the time was not right, he suggested, "for gratuitous interference in American affairs". In articles written for the New York-based Nation, Mitchel espoused proslavery thought and opposed Jewish emancipation in the United States. His views were similar to many other Young Ireland émigrés such as Thomas D'Arcy McGee, who defended American slavery while espousing Irish nationalism.

In February 1848 Mitchel established a paper of his own. Under its title The United Irishman he placed Wolfe Tone's declaration: "Our independence must be had at all hazards. If the men of property will not support us, they must fall; we can support ourselves by the aid of that numerous and respectable class of the community, the men of no property". The paper boldly advocated Lalor's policy. In May, as its publisher, Mitchel was convicted of a new crime of treason felony and sentenced to transportation for 14 years to the Royal Naval Dockyard on Ireland Island in the "Imperial fortress" of Bermuda (imprisoned in the Prison hulk HMS Dromedary), and Van Diemen's Land.

=== Land War or Parliamentary Obstruction ===
Duffy recalled from his youth a Quaker neighbour who had been a United Irishman and had laughed at the idea that the issue was kings and governments. What mattered was the land from which the people got their bread. Instead of singing the La Marseillaise, he said that what the men of '98 should have borrowed from the French was "their sagacious idea of bundling the landlords out of doors and putting tenants in their shoes". But Duffy's objection to "Lalor's theory" was that "his angry peasants, chafing like chained tigers, were creatures of the imagination--not the living people through whom we had to act". At the same time Duffy was trying to hold together a broader coalition, and had for that reason advanced O'Brien to the leadership, a Protestant and a landowner. On the Confederation's Council he was supported by Patrick James Smyth who argued that with propertied classes, as well as the priesthood opposed, the Confederation could not hope to call out a single parish in Ireland.

By a vote of fifteen to six, the Council adopted Duffy's alternative proposition: a Parliamentary Party that, accepting no favours, would press Ireland's claims by threatening to put a stop to the entire business of the Commons. Such a party would either have its demands conceded, or be forcibly ejected from Westminster, in which case the people united behind its single purpose would know how to enforce their will. Opposition was led by Thomas Devin Reilly and by Mitchel. Class coalitions attempted in past had failed, and they continued to insist on Lalor's plan.

== The path to insurrection ==
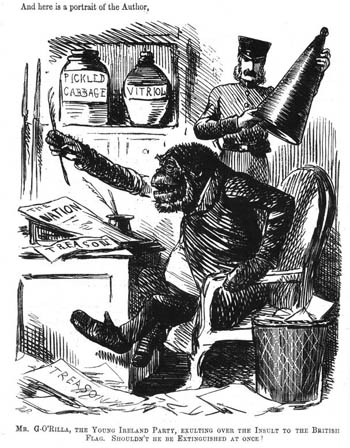
Depiction from Punch of "Mr. G. O'Rilla of the Young Ireland Party," reading The Nation with pickled cabbage and vitriol in jars on his shelf. A policeman holds an extinguisher to snuff him out.

=== Duffy's Creed ===
By the spring of 1848, the scale of the catastrophe facing the country had persuaded all parties on the Council that independence was an existential issue; that the immediate need was for an Irish national government able to take control of national resources. In May 1848 Duffy published "The Creed of the Nation." If Irish independence was to come by force, it would be in the form of a Republic. The avoidance of deadly animosities between Irishmen was of course preferable.

An independent Irish parliament, elected by widest possible suffrage, a responsible minister for Ireland [i.e. an Irish executive accountable to an Irish parliament] a Viceroy of Irish birth, would content the country... Such a parliament would inevitably establish Tenant Right, abolish the Established Church..., and endeavour to settle the claims of labour upon some solid and satisfactory basis. But one step further in the direction of Revolution... it would not go.

Other peoples in Europe had been protected from starvation because their rulers were "of their own blood and race". That this was not the case for Ireland, was the source of its present tragedy.

The Government made clear that its chosen response to the crisis in Ireland was coercion, not concession. Mitchel had been convicted under new martial law measures approved by Parliament (including by a number of "Old Ireland" MPs). On 9 July 1848 Duffy, with the Creed as evidence, was arrested for sedition. He managed to smuggle a few lines out to The Nation but the issue that would have carried his declaration, that there was no remedy now but the sword, was seized and the paper suppressed.

=== 1848 Uprising ===
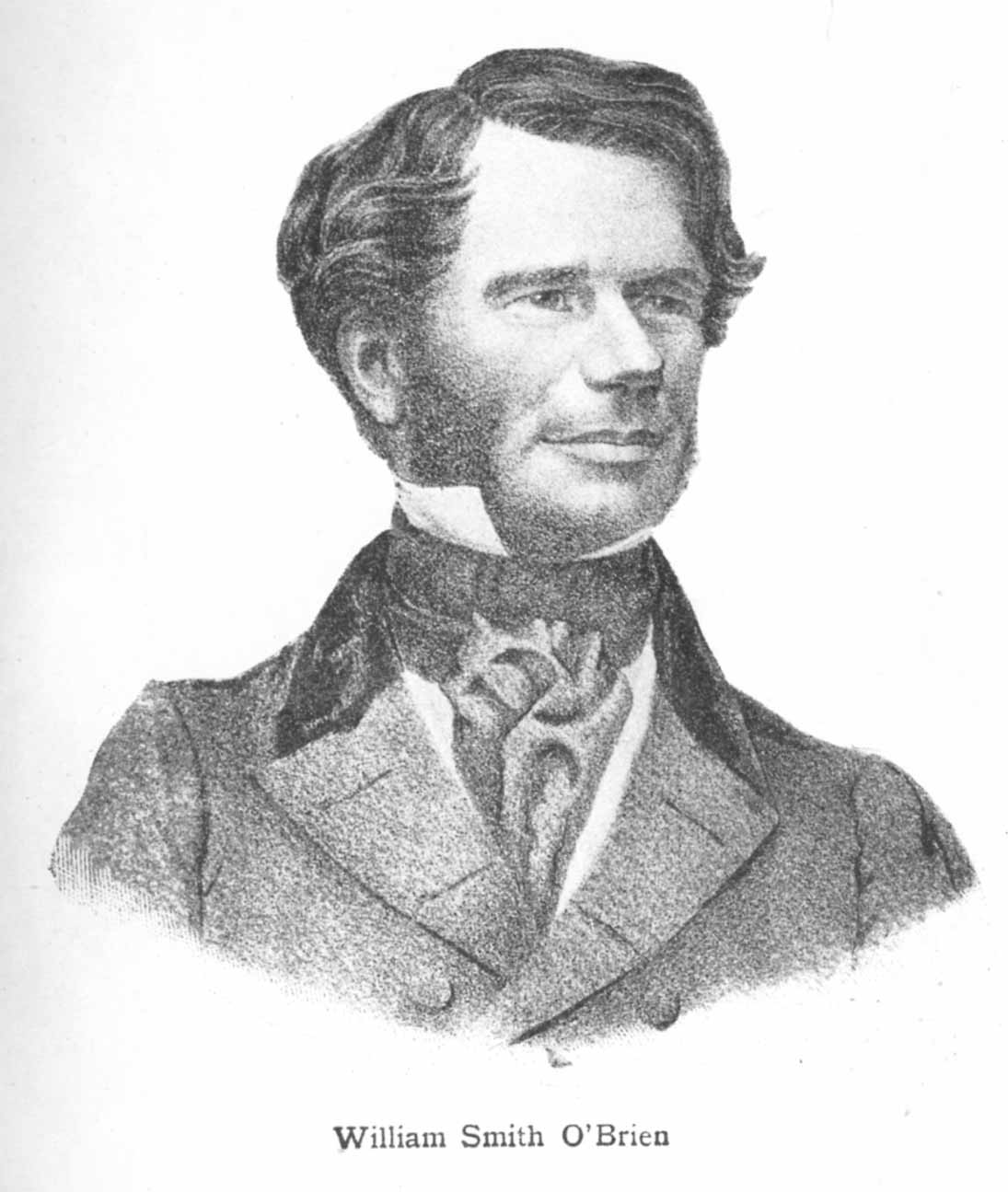
William Smith O'Brien

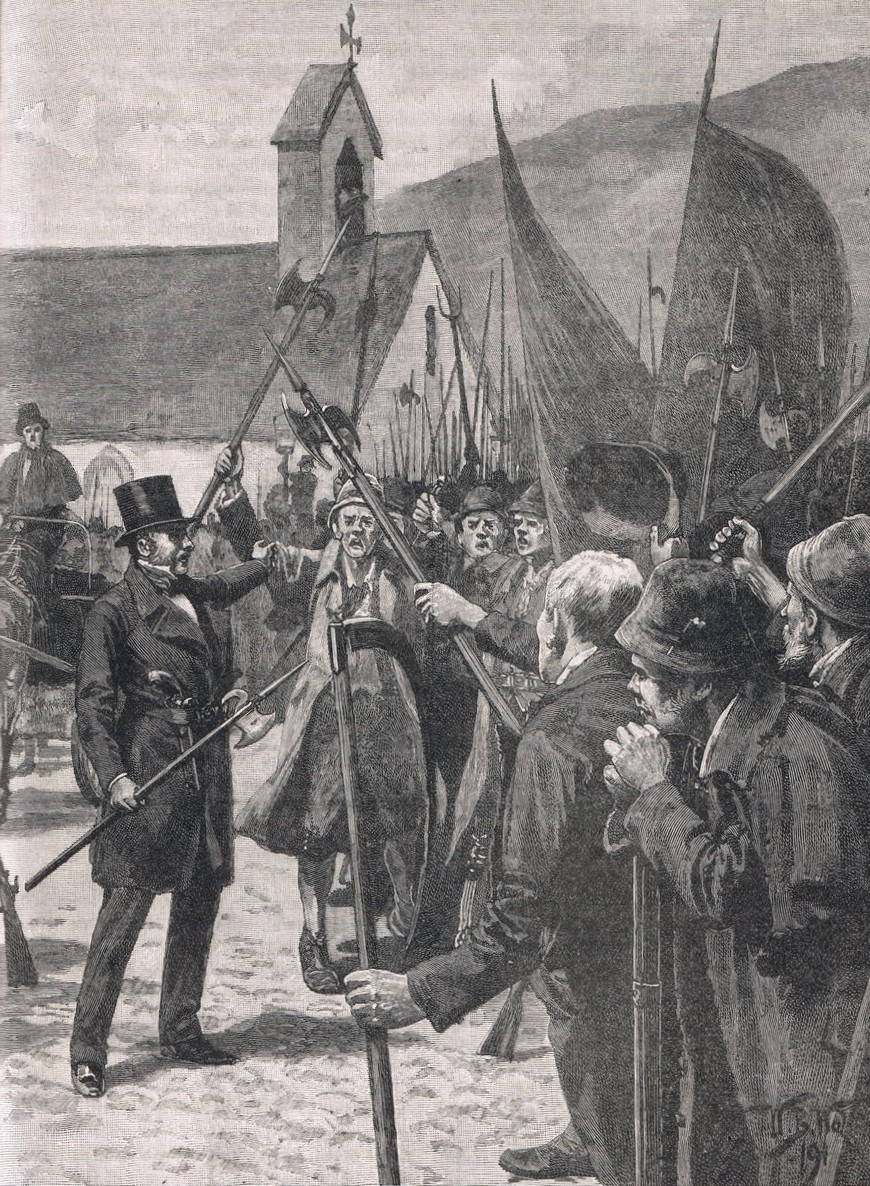
Muster of the Irish at Mullinahone, July 1848

Planning for an insurrection had already advanced. Mitchel, although the first to call for action, had scoffed at the necessity for systematic preparation. O'Brien, to Duffy's surprise, attempted the task. In March he had returned from a visit to revolutionary Paris with hopes of French assistance. (Among the leading republicans in France, Ledru-Rollin had been loud in his declaration of French support for the Irish cause). There was also talk of an Irish-American brigade and of a Chartist diversion in England (Allied with the Chartists, the Confederation had a relatively strong organised presence in Liverpool, Manchester and Salford). With Duffy's arrest, it was left to O'Brien to confront the reality of the Confederates' domestic isolation.

Having with Meagher and Dillon gathered a small group of both landowners and tenants, on 23 July O'Brien raised the standard of revolt in Kilkenny. This was a tricolour he had brought back from France, its colours (green for Catholics, orange for Protestants) intended to symbolise the United Irish republican ideal.

With Old Ireland and rural priesthood against them, the Confederates had no organised support in the countryside. Active membership was confined to the garrisoned towns. As O'Brien proceeded into Tipperary he was greeted by curious crowds, but found himself in command of only a few hundred ill-clad largely unarmed men. They scattered after their first skirmish with the constabulary, derisively referred to by The Times of London as "Battle of Widow McCormack's Cabbage Patch".

O'Brien and his colleagues were quickly arrested and convicted of treason. Following a public outpouring, the government commuted their death sentences to penal transportation to Van Diemen's Land, where they joined John Mitchel. Duffy alone escaped conviction. Thanks to a token Catholic juror whose character the government had misjudged, and able defence of Isaac Butt, Duffy was released in February 1849, the only major Young Ireland leader to remain in Ireland.

In a judgement shared by many of their sympathisers, John Devoy, the later Fenian, wrote of the Young Irelander rebellion:

The terrible Famine of 1847 forced the hand of the Young Irelanders and they rushed into a policy of Insurrection without the slightest military preparation... Their writings and speeches had converted a large number of the young men to the gospel of force and their pride impelled them to an effort to make good their preaching. But... an appeal to arms made to a disarmed people was little short of insanity.

James Connolly, however, was to argue that the response to arrest the Young Ireland leaders suggests that in the towns, people would have taken to arms if only the signal been given. He writes that when Duffy was arrested on July 9, Dublin workers surrounded the military escort, pressed up to Duffy and offered to begin an insurrection then and there. “Do you wish to be rescued?” “Certainly not,” said Duffy. In Cashel, Tipperary, people stormed the jail and rescued Michael Doheny, only for him to give himself up again and apply for bail. In Waterford, people brought the cavalcade carrying Meagher to a standstill with a barricade across a narrow bridge over the River Suir. They begged him to give the word, for they had the town already in their hands, but Meagher persisted in going with the soldiers, and ordered the barricade removed.

== Aftermath ==
=== The League of North and South ===
Convinced that "the Famine had 'dissolved society' and exposed landlordism both morally and economically", in September 1849 Lalor attempted with John Savage, Joseph Brenan and other Young Irelanders to revive the insurrection in Tipperary and Waterford. After an indecisive engagement at Cappoquin, once again in view of their small number the insurgents disbanded. Lalor died three months later of bronchitis. This was just as a new movement was lending new credence to his belief that the independence of cultivator would bring "national independence in its train".

Tenant farmers and cottiers may not have been prepared to fight for a republic, but with the formation of tenant protection societies they were beginning to see value in an open and legal combination for furtherance of their interests. Seeking to link the new tenant agitation to his vision of an independent parliamentary party, in August 1850 Duffy, with James McKnight, William Sharman Crawford and Frederick Lucas, moved the formation of an all-Ireland Tenant Right League. In addition to tenant representatives, among those gathered for the inaugural meeting were magistrates and landlords, Catholic priests and Presbyterian ministers, and journalists with the Presbyterian James McKnight of the Banner of Ulster in the chair.

In the 1852 election, organised around what Michael Davitt described as "the programme of the Whiteboys and Ribbonmen reduced to moral and constitutional standards", the League helped return Duffy (for New Ross) and 47 other MPs pledged to tenant-rights. What Duffy hailed as the "League of North and South", however, was less than it appeared. Many of the MPs had been sitting Repealers who had broken with the Whig government over the Ecclesiastical Titles Act, and only one pledged MP, William Kirk for Newry, was returned from Ulster.

After a modest land bill was defeated in the Lords, the "Independent Irish Party" began to unravel. Catholic Primate of Ireland, Archbishop Paul Cullen approved the MPs breaking their pledge of independent opposition and accepting positions in a new Whig administration. In the North McKnight and Crawford had their meetings broken up by Orange "bludgeon men".

Broken in health and spirit, Duffy published in 1855 a farewell address to his constituency, declaring that he had resolved to retire from parliament, as it was no longer possible to accomplish the task for which he had solicited their votes. He emigrated to Australia. From 1870 a Land League and Irish Parliamentary Party realised the combination he had sought: coordinated agrarian agitation and obstructionist representation at Westminster.

=== Irish Republican Brotherhood ===
Some of the "Men of 1848" carried the commitment to physical force forward into the Irish Republican Brotherhood (IRB), formed in 1858 in Dublin, and in the sister Fenian Brotherhood (later Clan na Gael) established by Meagher and fellow exiles in the United States. In 1867, in a loosely co-ordinated action, the Fenians, mobilising Irish veterans of the American Civil War, raided across the northern border of the United States with a view to holding Canada hostage to the grant of Irish Independence. while the IRB attempted an armed rising at home.

With critical and continuing support from the Irish post-Famine diaspora in the United States, the IRB survived to play a critical role in raising the Young Irelander tricolour over Dublin in the Easter Rising of 1916.

== Notable Young Irelanders ==
- Thomas Antisell
- Joseph Brenan
- Margaret Callan
- Thomas D'Arcy McGee
- Thomas Davis
- John Blake Dillon
- Michael Doheny
- Charles Gavan Duffy
- Father John Kenyon
- James Fintan Lalor
- Terence MacManus
- Thomas MacNevin
- John Martin
- Thomas Francis Meagher
- John Mitchel
- William Smith O'Brien
- Kevin Izod O'Doherty
- Patrick O'Donoghue
- John Edward Pigot
- Thomas Devin Reilly
- John Savage
- Jane Wilde
- Richard D'Alton Williams

== See also ==
- Famine Rebellion of 1848
- Great Famine (Ireland)
- History of Ireland (1801–1923)
