= John Savage (Fenian) =

Irish poet, journalist and author (1828–1888)

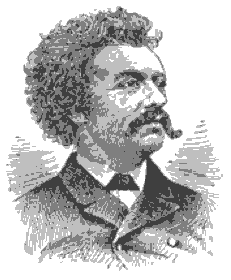
- Born: 13 December 1828; Dublin, Ireland
- Died: 9 October 1888 (aged 59); Spragueville, Pennsylvania
- Occupation: Writer
- Spouse: Louise Reid (m. 1854)

John Savage (13 December 1828 – 9 October 1888) was a poet, journalist and author. He was a member of both the Young Irelanders and the Fenians.

== Early life ==
John Savage, who was born in Dublin on 13 December 1828. As a young art student in Dublin he was drawn into the insurrectionary movement in '48. On 11 March 1848 he wrote a letter which appeared in The Nation newspaper stating: "A the period, I trust, is rapidly approaching when the skill and valour of our citizen soldiers will be put to the test, I am induced, on the part of a large number of students of the different professions, to suggest the immediate organisation in Dublin of a society on the basis of the Ecole Polytechnique of Paris." A Students' Club was later formed as a direct result of this letter.

== Students' Club ==
In April 1848, Savage and John de Courcey Young produced a provocative publication called The Patriot, which was at once suppressed and seized by the British Government. In the same month, at a meeting of the Students' Club, with Savage presiding, at their rooms, No. 27 Eden Quay, it was decided to appoint a subcommittee of five "to ascertain and report on the best method of the members of the Club arming themselves individually." This followed on from a proposition by Richard Dalton Williams, one of the most popular of all The Nations poets.

== Irish Tribune ==
Savage wrote poems for The Irish Tribune, the first number of which appeared on 10 June 1848, and which was suppressed after the fifth issue. It was his association with the Irish Tribune which would become largely responsible for developing his poetic and literary talents. The opening stanza of his first poem, "Up! Up! Brothers All", was described as a "National Anthem of Freedom".

Up! Up! Brothers all
For Liberty dear!
From Dark Donegal
To sea-beat Cape Clear,
From Achill's west isles
To Ben Heder's head
A young nation smiles
Round Liberty's bed.

Because of his activities in the School of Art, the Royal Dublin Society suggested that he could not remain a student in the academy and on the arrest of Kevin Izod O'Doherty and Dalton Williams, the registered proprietors of the Tribune in July, Savage, in order to avoid arrest left Dublin. He went to County Tipperary in search of William Smith O'Brien and the other Irish Confederation leaders. Meeting John O'Mahony, the two organised an attack on the barracks at Portlaw, County Waterford, but were not successful and had to withdraw for want of adequate forces.

== Escape to America ==
He succeeded in escaping on board a ship from Dublin to America, arriving in New York City on 7 November 1848. Within a week he was appointed a proof reader on the New York Tribune. In January 1854, Savage became involved with John Mitchel's first American newspaper, The Citizen. In August of that year he married Louise Reid, daughter of Samuel Chester Reid, a sea captain, who according to T.F. O'Sullivan, had the distinction of designing the present form of the American flag.

== Author ==
In 1856 Savage published his '98 and '48 in addition to his Fenian Heroes and Martyrs and Picturesque Ireland.

In 1857 Savage went to Washington, where he became the principal leader writer on the States Journal. He wrote a tragedy entitled Sybil, which was then produced in various parts of America, and would later be published in 1850. In 1860 he published Our Leading Representative Men, containing sketches of Presidential candidates in 1861. One of these sketches he expanded, and published it as a Life of Andrew Johnson.

According to T.F. O'Sullivan, Savage is said to have joined the 69th Regiment and to have taken part in the Civil War on the side of the Federal Government. During this time he wrote inspiring War poems, one of which, "The Starry Flag", was written during May 1861, on board the United States transport Marmion as she sailed up the Potomac through the massed batteries of the enemy.

Various editions of Savage's poems have been published in America. His finest poem, O'Sullivan says, was "Shane's Head".

== Fenians ==
Savage played a leading part in organising the Fenian movement in America, traveling through the United States on their behalf. He was proposed by President Johnson as United States Consul in Leeds but the appointment was never made. He became very popular as a lecturer. In 1879, Saint John's College, Fordham, Westchester County (later to become Fordham University, and the Bronx) conferred on him the honorary degree of LL.D.

== Death ==
John Savage died in his sixtieth year at his summer residence at Laurelside, near Spraigueville, Pa., on 9 October 1888, leaving a widow and an adopted daughter.
