= The Nation (Irish newspaper) =

Irish newspaper (1842–1848; 1849–1900)

- Type: Weekly newspaper
- Founded: 15 October 1842; 183 years ago
- Political alignment: Irish nationalism
- Language: English
- Headquarters: Dublin

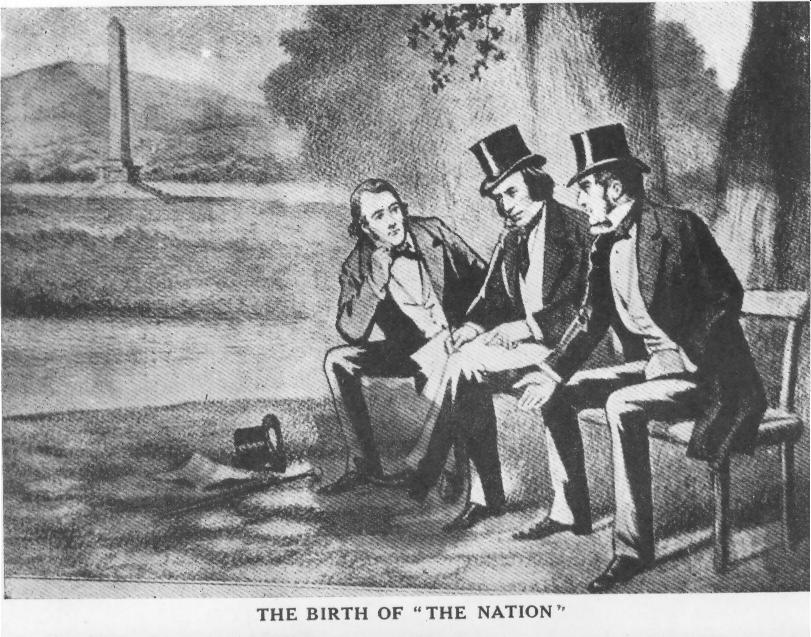
Birth of The Nation

The Nation was an Irish nationalist weekly newspaper, published in the 1840s initially in support of the Repeal Association of Daniel O'Connell. Against the background of the Great Famine, the Young Ireland group of writers associated with the weekly, broke with O'Connell arguing for a radical confrontation with the system of British rule. After the abortive Rebellion of 1848, many of the group were convicted of sedition, and the paper was suppressed.

== Background ==
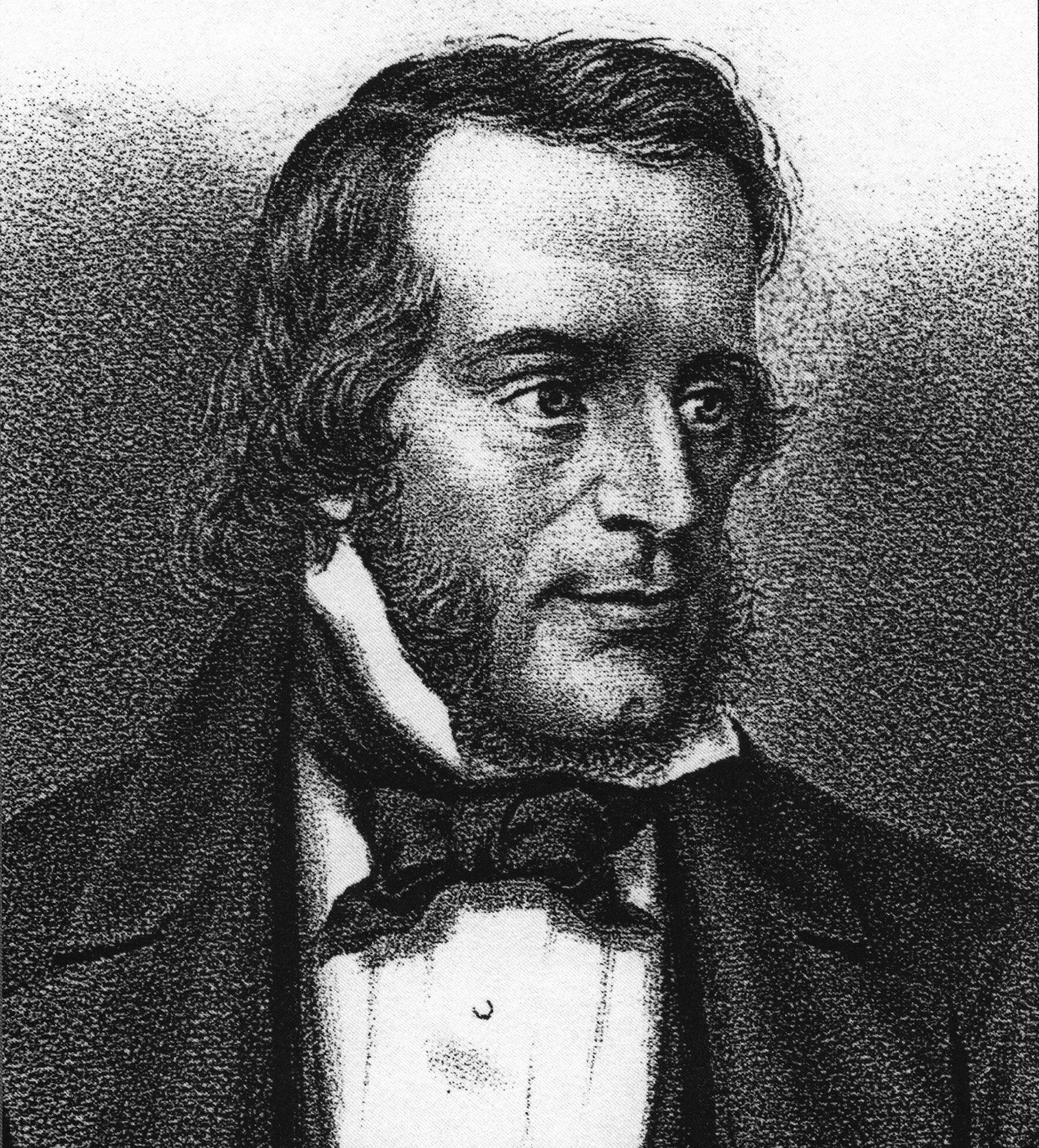
Thomas Davis

The founders of The Nation were three young men – two Catholics and one Protestant – who, according to the historian of the newspaper T. F. O'Sullivan, were all "free from the slightest taint of bigotry, and were anxious to unite all creeds and classes for the country's welfare.". They were Charles Gavan Duffy, its first editor; Thomas Davis, and John Blake Dillon. All three were members of Daniel O'Connell's Repeal Association, which sought repeal of the 1800 Act of Union between Ireland and Britain; this association would later be known as Young Ireland. The name suggested by Duffy for the paper was The National, but Davis disagreed, suggesting "that the use of an adjective for such a purpose was contrary to the analogies of the English language". He suggested The Nation, which was assented to by all three. "We desired to make Ireland a nation", Duffy wrote, "and the name would be a fitting prelude to the attempt.". In due course and after many other consultations between the founders, the following announcement was made as to the date of publication, the name of the journal, and the contributors:.

On the first Saturday in October will be published the first number of a; DUBLIN WEEKLY JOURNAL TO BE CALLED THE NATION, for which the services of the most eminent political writers in the country have been secured. It will be edited by Charles Gavan Duffy, Editor of The Vindicator (Ulster Newspaper), aided by the, following distinguished contributors:— JOHN O'CONNELL, ESQ., M.P.; Thomas Osborne Davis, Esq., Barrister-at-Law; W. J. O'Neill Daunt, Esq., Author of The Green Book, John B. Dillon, Esq., Barrister-at-Law Clarence Mangan, Esq., Author of Anthologia Germanica and Litterae Orientales; The Late Editor of the London Magazine and Charivari, J. C. Fitzgerald, Editor of The True Sun, And others whose names we are not at liberty to publish.

The paper was first published on Saturday 15 October 1842.

== The Prospectus ==
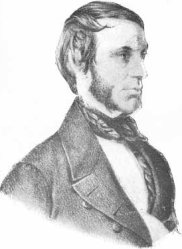
John Blake Dillon (1814–1866)

In the Prospectus, which was written by Davis with the exception of one sentence, it was stated,

The projectors of the NATION have been told that there is no room in Ireland for another Liberal Journal; but they think differently. . . . The necessities of the country seem to demand a Journal able to aid and organise the new movements going on amongst us—to make their growth deeper, and their fruit 'more racy of the soil'— and, above all, to direct the popular mind and the sympathies of educated men of all parties to the great end of nationality . . . —a nationality which will not only raise our people from their poverty, by securing to them the blessings of a domestic legislature, but inflame and purify them with a lofty and heroic love of country—a nationality of the spirit as well as the letter—a nationality which may come to be stamped upon our manners, our literature, and our deeds—a nationality which may embrace Protestant, Catholic, and Dissenter, Milesian and Cromwellian, the Irishman of a hundred generations, and the stranger who is within our gates; not a nationality which would preclude civil war, but which would establish internal union and external independence—a nationality which would be recognised by the world, and sanctified by wisdom, virtue, and time.

== Publishing success ==
The weekly was as an immediate publishing success. Its sales soared above all other Irish papers, weekly or daily. Circulation at its height was reckoned to be close to a quarter of a million. With its focus upon editorials, historical articles and verse, all intended to shape public opinion, copies continued to be read in Repeal Reading Rooms and to be passed from hand to hand long after their current news value had faded.

Beyond Davis and Dillon's Historical Society companions, the paper drew on a widening circle of contributors. Among the more politically committed these included: the Repeal MP William Smith O'Brien; Tithe War veteran James Fintan Lalor; prose and verse writer Michael Doheny; author of Traits and Stories of the Irish Peasantry, William Carleton; militant-nationalist priest, John Kenyon; republican and labour-rights activist Thomas Devin Reilly; former American journalist (and future "Father of the Canadian Confederation") Thomas D'Arcy McGee; and the renowned Repeal orator Thomas Francis Meagher.

Women wrote for the paper typically under pseudonyms, among them the poet and early suffragist Jane Elgee (later to be Oscar Wilde's mother, and known universally as "Speranza" of The Nation); Ellen Mary Patrick Dowling ("Mary"); and Mary Eva Kelly ("Eva"), who would marry Kevin Izod O'Doherty. These three were known as the "Three Graces" of The Nation. Marie Thompson ("Eithne"), Elizabeth Willoughby Treacy ("Finola"), Rose Kavanagh ("Ruby") and Olivia Knight ("Thomasine") were also contributors. In July 1848 Jane Elgee and Margaret Callan assumed editorial control of The Nation during Gavan Duffy's imprisonment in Newgate.

== Break with O'Connell, split with Mitchel ==
It was an English journalist who first applied to this growing circle the label "Young Ireland". Although there was no direct connection, the reference was to Giuseppe Mazzini's insurrectionist, anti-clerical, Young Italy, and to other European national-republican movements that Mazzini had sought loosely to federate under the aegis of "Young Europe" (Giovine Europa). When O'Connell picked up on the moniker and began referring to those at The Nation as "Young Irelanders" it was a signal for an impending break.

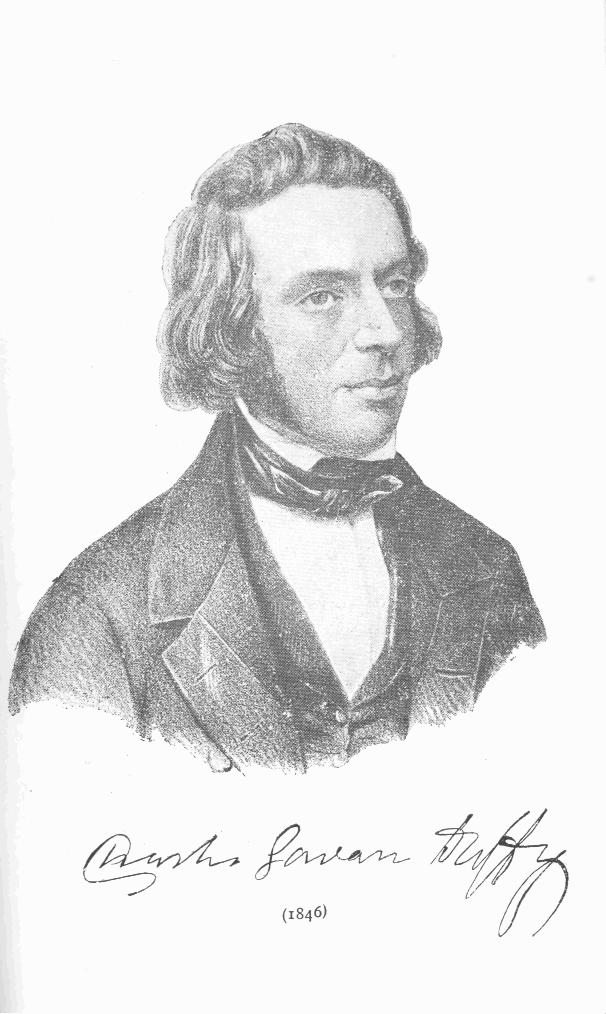
Charles Gavan Duffy

The success of the paper may have been a "reinforcement for which O’Connell had scarcely dared to hope" in reviving the agitation for Repeal, but unlike the officers of the Repeal Association, the Young Irelanders at The Nation did not operate at his direction. They were critical of his accommodations with the Whigs in England;. questioned the depth of his commitment to Irish legislative independence (in an open letter in The Nation, Duffy pressed O'Connell to affirm Repeal as his object); and suggested by the martial ardour of their declarations in favour of Irish rights, that liberties of the country would be yielded to "agitation" alone, but would in the end, the liberties have to be fought for.

John Mitchel joined the staff of The Nation in the autumn of 1845. With the onset of the Great Famine, parts of the country were in a state of semi-insurrection. Tenants conspirators, in the tradition of the Whiteboys and Ribbonmen, were attacking process servers, intimidating land agents, and resisting evictions. When the London journal the Standard observed that the new Irish railways could be used to transport government troops to quickly curb agrarian unrest, Mitchel responded that the tracks could be turned into pikes and trains ambushed. O’Connell publicly distanced himself from The Nation, appearing to some to set Duffy, as the editor, up for prosecution. In the case that followed, Mitchel successfully defended Duffy in court. O'Connell and his son John were determined to press the issue. On the threat of their own resignations, they carried a resolution in the Repeal Association declaring that under no circumstances was a nation justified in asserting its liberties by force of arms.

With their paper, the Young Irelanders withdrew from the Repeal Association, and in January 1847 formed themselves as the Irish Confederation. Their objectives were "independence of the Irish nation" with "no means to attain that end abjured, save such as were inconsistent with honour, morality and reason".

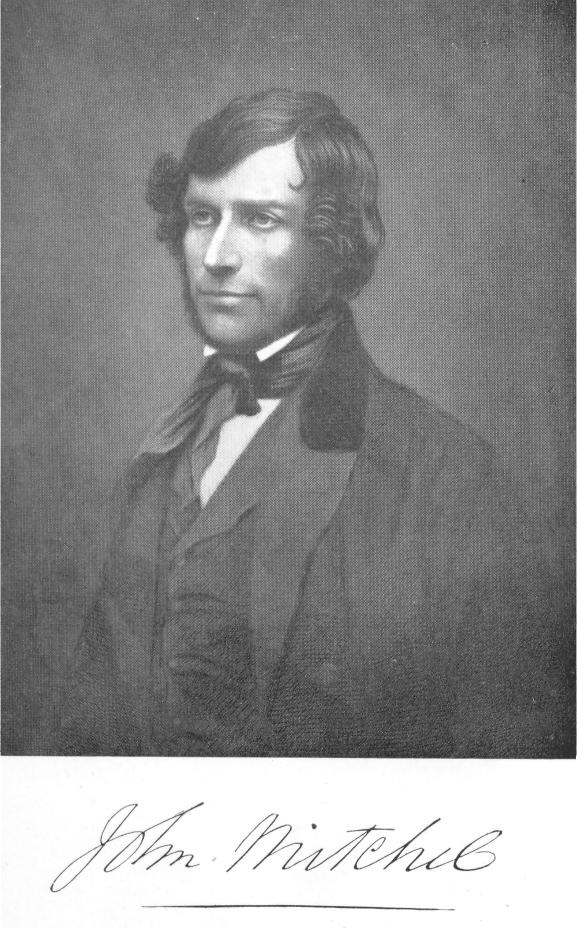
John Mitchel became the lead writer of the nation on the death of Davis

In the spring of 1847, Duffy fell out with Mitchel and moved to censor his articles. He believed that Mitchel, under the malign influence of Thomas Carlyle, had lent the journal to "the monstrous task of applauding negro slavery and of denouncing the emancipation of the Jews." Before relations could be repaired, Mitchel resigned his position as leader writer on The Nation, and started his own paper, The United Irishman. He later maintained that he had done so because, in the face of its "famine policy", the system of British government in Ireland "ought to be met with resistance at every point".

In May, as its publisher, Mitchel was convicted of a new crime of treason felony and sentenced to 14 years transportation.

== Suppression and aftermath ==
The role played by some of its key figures in the paper in the ill-fated Young Irelander Rebellion of 1848 cemented the paper's reputation as the voice of Irish radicalism. Their death sentences for treason commuted, the leaders, excepting Dillon who escaped to France, joined Mitchel Van Diemen's Land (Tasmania). Duffy alone escaped conviction. Defended by Isaac Butt he was eventually freed after his fifth trial.

In July 1848, Duffy had managed to smuggle a few lines out to The Nation from prison but the issue that would have carried his declaration that there was no remedy now but the sword was seized and the paper was suppressed.

Its triumvirate of founders followed differing paths. Davis had died, aged 30, in 1845. Both Dillon and Duffy became Members of Parliament (MPs) in the House of Commons of the United Kingdom. Duffy, despairing of meaningful reform, emigrated to Australia where he became premier of the state of Victoria, later being knighted as a Knight Commander of St Michael and St George (KCMG). Dillon died in 1866. His son, John Dillon became leader of the Irish Parliamentary Party and his grandson, James Dillon, leader of Fine Gael.

Later political figures associated with the paper included TD Sullivan and J. J. Clancy.

== Contributors ==
Mangan memorial in Dublin

- Denis Florence MacCarthy
- C. P. Meehan
- William Carleton
- John Keegan Casey
- John Mitchel
- John Kenyon
- Michael Doheny
- Thomas D'Arcy McGee
- Richard Robert Madden
- John Kells Ingram (author of "The Memory of the Dead")
- Edward Walsh
- James Fintan Lalor
- Thomas Devin Reilly
- John Edward Pigot
- Charles Kickham
- Jane Wilde
- Richard D'Alton Williams
- Thomas MacNevin
- John Cashel Hoey, editor 1849–57.
- Michael Hogan – "The Bard of Thomond"
- Hugh Heinrick
