= Terry Alts =

Irish secret society

The Terry Alts was an Irish secret society allegedly named after a Protestant army pensioner.

The Terry Alts was one of many clandestine societies founded in Ireland. The society was set up in 1828 in the Corofin/ Klnaboy area and was active in rural communities of County Clare until 1831.

The society can be traced back to the collapse of the local tillage system after the Napoleonic Wars, which was followed by an increase in cattle rearing. This new agrarian focus resulted in many labourers losing their livelihood. When the potato crop failed in 1830 the labourers were forced to borrow money from wealthier farmers. This led to disputes regarding the repayment of these loan and eventually resulting in labourers joining to protect their rights.
