= Thomas Gallagher (writer) =

American writer

- Born: 1918; Manhattan, New York, U.S.
- Died: December 19, 1992 (aged 73–74); Manhattan, New York, U.S.
- Education: Columbia University
- Occupations: Writer; seaman
- Awards: Edgar Award for Best Fact Crime (1960)

Thomas Gallagher (1918 – December 19, 1992) was an American writer and seaman known for his writing on disasters and military heroism. He won a Edgar Award in 1960 and was a National Book Award for Fiction finalist in 1953.

== Biography ==
Gallagher was born in Manhattan in 1918. He graduated from Columbia College in 1941 and served in Iran during World War II with the Army Corps of Engineers and became a seaman in the United States Merchant Marine, when he began to write.

Gallagher's book Fire at Sea (1959), an investigation into the 1934 SS Morro Castle disaster, received an Edgar Award for Best Fact Crime in 1960. His book The Gathering Darkness (1952), which traced a family whose life were upended after the 1929 Stock Market Crash, was a National Book Award for Fiction finalist in 1953.

Gallagher died on December 19, 1992, in Manhattan.
