= Irish Confederation =

- Chairman: John Shine Lawlor
- Founded: 13 January 1847
- Split from: Repeal Association
- Ideology: Irish nationalism Young Ireland; Irish Repeal

The Irish Confederation was an Irish nationalist independence movement, established on 13 January 1847 by members of the Young Ireland movement who had seceded from Daniel O'Connell's Repeal Association. Historian T. W. Moody described it as "the official organisation of Young Ireland".

== Historical background ==
In June 1846, Sir Robert Peel's Tory Ministry fell, and the Whigs under Lord John Russell came to power. Daniel O'Connell, founder of the Repeal Association which campaigned for a repeal of the Act of Union of 1800 between Great Britain and Ireland, simultaneously attempted to move the Association into supporting the Russell administration and English Liberalism.

The intention was that Repeal agitation would be damped down in return for a profuse distribution of patronage through Conciliation Hall, home of the Repeal Association. On 15 June 1846 Thomas Francis Meagher denounced English Liberalism in Ireland saying that there was a suspicion that the national cause of Repeal would be sacrificed to the Whig government and that the people who were striving for freedom would be "purchased back into factious vassalage." Meagher and the other “Young Irelanders" (an epithet of opprobrium used by O'Connell to describe the young men of The Nation newspaper), as active Repealers, vehemently denounced in Conciliation Hall any movement towards English political parties, be they Whig or Tory, so long as Repeal was denied.

The "Tail" as the "corrupt gang of politicians who fawned on O'Connell" were named, and who hoped to gain from the government places decided that the Young Irelanders must be driven from the Repeal Association. The Young Irelanders were to be presented as revolutionaries, factionists, infidels and secret enemies of the Church. For this purpose resolutions were introduced to the repeal Association on 13 July which declared that under no circumstances was a nation justified in asserting its liberties by force of arms. The Young Irelanders, as members of the association, had never advocated the use of physical force to advance the cause of repeal and opposed any such policy. Known as the "Peace Resolutions,” they declared that physical force was immoral under any circumstances to obtain national rights. Meagher agreed that only moral and peaceful means should be adopted by the Association, but if it were determined that Repeal could not be carried by those means, a no less honourable one he would adopt though it be more perilous. The resolutions would again be raised on 28 July in the Association and Meagher would then deliver his famous "Sword Speech".

Addressing the Peace Resolutions, Meagher held that there was no necessity for them. Under the existing circumstances of the country, any provocation to arms would be senseless and wicked. He dissented from the Resolutions because by assenting to them he would pledged himself to the unqualified repudiation of physical force "in all countries, at all times, and in every circumstance." There were times when arms would suffice, and when political amelioration called for "a drop of blood, and many thousand drops of blood." He then "eloquently defended physical force as an agency in securing national freedom." Having been at first semi-hostile, Meagher carried the audience to his side and the plot against the Young Irelanders was placed in peril of defeat. Observing this he was interrupted by O'Connell's son John who declared that either he or Meagher must leave the hall. William Smith O'Brien then protested against John O'Connell's attempt to suppress a legitimate expression of opinion, and left with other prominent Young Irelanders, and never returned.

== Foundation ==
After negotiations for a reunion had failed, the seceders decided to establish a new organisation which would be called the Irish Confederation. Its founders determined to revive the uncompromising demand for a national Parliament with full legislative and executive powers. They were resolute on a complete prohibition of place-hunting or acceptance of office under the existing Government. They wished to return to the honest policy of the earlier years of the Repeal Association, and would be supported by the young men, who had shown their repugnance for the corruption and insincerity of Conciliation Hall by their active sympathy with the seceders. There were extensive indications that many of the previously Unionist class, in both the cities and among land owners, were resentful of the neglect of Irish needs by the British Parliament since the famine began. What they demanded was vital legislative action to provide both employment and food, and to prevent all further export of the corn, cattle, pigs and butter which were still leaving the country. On this there was a general consensus of Irish opinion according to Dennis Gwynn, "such as had not been known since before the Act of Union."

The first meeting of the Irish Confederation took place in the Rotunda, Dublin on 13 January 1847. The chairperson for the first meeting was John Shine Lawlor, the honorary secretaries being John Blake Dillon and Charles Gavan Duffy. Duffy would later be replaced by Meagher. Ten thousand members would be enrolled, but of the gentry there were very few, the middle class stood apart and the Catholic clergy were unfriendly. In view of the poverty of the people, subscriptions would be purely voluntary, the founders of the new movement would bear the cost themselves if necessary.

== 1847 General Election ==
In the 1847 United Kingdom general election, three Irish Confederation candidates stood - Richard O'Gorman in Limerick City, William Smith O'Brien in Limerick County and Thomas Chisholm Anstey in Youghal. O'Brien and Anstey were elected.

== Activities in England ==
Following mass emigration by Irish people to England, the Irish Confederation then organised there also. There were more than a dozen Confederate Clubs in Liverpool and over 700 members of 16 clubs located in Manchester and Salford.

== See also ==
- Joseph Henry Blake
- William Smith O'Brien
- Robert Cane
- Michael Doheny
- Charles Gavan Duffy
- D'Arcy McGee
- Father John Kenyon
- James Fintan Lalor
- Terence MacManus
- Thomas Francis Meagher
- John Mitchel
- Thomas Devin Reilly
- Patrick James Smyth

== Notes and references ==
General

- Doheny, Michael (1951). The Felon's Track. Dublin: M. H. Gill & Son.
- Duffy, Charles Gavan (1888). Four Years of Irish History 1845–1849. London: Cassell, Petter, Galpin & Co.
- Duffy, Charles Gavan (1880). Young Ireland. London: Cassell, Petter, Galpin & Co. ISBN 9780306711190.
- Griffith, Arthur (1916). Meagher of the Sword, :Speeches of Thomas Francis Meagher in Ireland 1846–1848. Dublin: M. H. Gill & Son, Ltd.
- Lyons, W. F. (2007). Brigadier-General Thomas Francis Meagher – His Political and Military Career. Dickens Press. ISBN 978-1-4067-3027-2.
- O'Sullivan, T. F. (1945). Young Ireland. The Kerryman Ltd.
- Ua Cellaigh, Seán; Sullivan, T. D.; A. M.; D. B. (1953). Speeches from the Dock. Dublin: M. H. Gill & Son.
- Gwynn, Dennis (1949). Young Ireland and 1848. Cork: Cork University Press.
- Moody, T.W. (1981). Davitt and Irish Revolution 1846–82. Oxford: Clarendon Press.

Additional reading

- The Politics of Irish Literature: from Thomas Davis to W.B. Yeats, Malcolm Brown, Allen & Unwin, 1973.
- John Mitchel, A Cause Too Many, Aidan Hegarty, Camlane Press.
- Thomas Davis, The Thinker and Teacher, Arthur Griffith, M.H. Gill & Son 1922.
- Brigadier-General Thomas Francis Meagher His Political and Military Career, Capt. W. F. Lyons, Burns Oates & Washbourne Limited 1869
- Young Ireland and 1848, Dennis Gwynn, Cork University Press 1949.
- Daniel O'Connell The Irish Liberator, Dennis Gwynn, Hutchinson & Co, Ltd.
- O'Connell Davis and the Colleges Bill, Dennis Gwynn, Cork University Press 1948.
- Smith O'Brien And The "Secession", Dennis Gwynn, Cork University Press
- Meagher of The Sword, Edited By Arthur Griffith, M. H. Gill & Son, Ltd. 1916.
- Young Irelander Abroad The Diary of Charles Hart, Edited by Brendan O'Cathaoir, University Press.
- John Mitchel First Felon for Ireland, Edited By Brian O'Higgins, Brian O'Higgins 1947.
- Rossa's Recollections 1838 to 1898, Intro by Sean O'Luing, The Lyons Press 2004.
- Labour in Ireland, James Connolly, Fleet Street 1910.
- The Re-Conquest of Ireland, James Connolly, Fleet Street 1915.
- John Mitchel Noted Irish Lives, Louis J. Walsh, The Talbot Press Ltd 1934.
- Thomas Davis: Essays and Poems, Centenary Memoir, M. H Gill, M.H. Gill & Son, Ltd MCMXLV.
- Life of John Martin, P. A. Sillard, James Duffy & Co., Ltd 1901.
- Life of John Mitchel, P. A. Sillard, James Duffy and Co., Ltd 1908.
- John Mitchel, P. S. O'Hegarty, Maunsel & Company, Ltd 1917.
- The Fenians in Context Irish Politics & Society 1848–82, R. V. Comerford, Wolfhound Press 1998
- William Smith O'Brien and the Young Ireland Rebellion of 1848, Robert Sloan, Four Courts Press 2000
- Irish Mitchel, Seamus MacCall, Thomas Nelson and Sons Ltd 1938.
- Ireland Her Own, T. A. Jackson, Lawrence & Wishart Ltd 1976.
- Life and Times of Daniel O'Connell, T. C. Luby, Cameron & Ferguson.
- Young Ireland, T. F. O'Sullivan, The Kerryman Ltd. 1945.
- Irish Rebel John Devoy and America's Fight for Irish Freedom, Terry Golway, St. Martin's Griffin 1998.
- Paddy's Lament Ireland 1846–1847 Prelude to Hatred, Thomas Gallagher, Poolbeg 1994.
- The Great Shame, Thomas Keneally, Anchor Books 1999.
- James Fintan Lalor, Thomas, P. O'Neill, Golden Publications 2003.
- Charles Gavan Duffy: Conversations With Carlyle (1892), with Introduction, Stray Thoughts On Young Ireland, by Brendan Clifford, Athol Books, Belfast, ISBN 0-85034-114-0. (Pg. 32 Titled, Foster’s account Of Young Ireland.)
- Envoi, Taking Leave Of Roy Foster, by Brendan Clifford and Julianne Herlihy, Aubane Historical Society, Cork.
- The Falcon Family, or, Young Ireland, by M. W. Savage, London, 1845. (An Gorta Mor)Quinnipiac University
