= Independent Irish Party =

- Founded: 1852; 174 years ago
- Dissolved: 1858; 168 years ago
- Political position: Independent opposition in the interest of tenant right and land reform
- Colours: Green

The Independent Irish Party (IIP) was the designation chosen by the 48 Members of the United Kingdom Parliament returned from Ireland with the endorsement of the Tenant Right League in the 1852 general election. The League had secured their promise to offer an independent opposition (refusing all government favour and office) to the dominant landlord interest, and to advance an agrarian reform programme popularly summarised as the "three F's": fair rent, fixed tenure and free sale.

The unity of the grouping was compromised by the priority the majority gave to repealing the Ecclesiastical Titles Act, legislation passed by the Liberal government of Lord John Russell to hamper the restoration in the United Kingdom of a Catholic episcopate, and their independence by the defection of two of their leading members to a new Whig-Peelite government.

After further defections, thirteen independents survived the elections in 1857, but then split 1859 on the question of supporting a new Liberal ministry which, in 1860, made the first halting attempt to regulate Irish land tenure.

== Formation and early disunity ==
The Tenant Right League joined tenant rights associations in largely Presbyterian districts in Ulster with tenant protection societies (often guided by local Catholic clergy) in the south. It was formed in 1850 at a tenant right convention called in Dublin by Charles Gavan Duffy, editor of the revived Young Irelander weekly The Nation; James MacKnight editor of the Londonderry Sentinel; Frederick Lucas, founder of the international Catholic weekly, The Tablet; and John Gray, owner of the leading nationalist paper, the Freeman's Journal. Against the background of the distress caused by the Great Famine and by a fall in agricultural prices, Duffy believed that the demand for tenant rights could serve as the basis for a new all-Ireland movement and for a (potentially abstentionist) national party.

The Westminster elections of July 1852 returned 48 MPs, including Duffy from New Ross, pledged to the tenant cause. But what Duffy had projected as a "League of North and South" failed to deliver in Ulster. William Kirk from the border town of Newry was province's only tenant-right representative. In Monaghan, the Rev. David Bell was to find that of his 100 Presbyterian congregants who had signed the requisition asking John Gray to stand in their constituency only 11 voted for him. In County Down, William Sharman Crawford, who as MP for Rochdale in England had been the author of a tenant right bill, had his meetings broken up by Orange vigilantes.

An early difficulty in appealing to Protestant tenants and voters in the north was the declared intention of many League-endorsed candidates to repeal the Ecclesiastical Titles Act 1851. Together with the presence among them of so many sitting Repeal Association MPs, their determination to remove the Act's restrictions on a restored Catholic Church hierarchy heightened the suspicion that the League was being used for political purposes beyond its declared agenda. In this, the prominent County Down tenant-righter, Julius McCullagh, argued the 1851 Act worked its purpose: to "afresh old grudges and differences - to divide a people now happily uniting". It was the case as well that landowners in the north threatened to withdraw their consent for the existing Ulster Custom if their Conservative nominees were not elected.

In November 1852, Lord Derby's short-lived Conservative ministry introduced a land bill to compensate Irish tenants on eviction for improvements they had made to the land. The Tenant Compensation Bill passed in the House of Commons in 1853 and 1854, but failed in the House of Lords. The bills had little impressed the League and its MPs as landlords would have been left free to pass on the costs of compensation through their still unrestricted freedom to raise rents.

Holding the balance of power in the House of Commons, the Independent Irish MPs voted to bring down the government. But in the process two of the leading members, John Sadleir and William Keogh, broke their pledges of independent opposition and accepted positions in a new Whig-Peelite ministry of Lord Aberdeen. Twenty others followed as reliable supporters. While Aberdeen opposed to the Ecclesiastical Titles Act, his government gave no undertakings in regard to tenant-right policy Significantly in a League debate in February 1853 MacKnight, wary of any sign of Irish separatism, did not support Duffy in condemning these desertions. Rather, he protested the increasingly strident nationalism of southern League spokesman.

== Split and dissolution ==
The Catholic Primate, Archbishop Paul Cullen, who had been sceptical of the independent opposition policy from the outset, sought to rein in clerical support for the remaining IIP in the constituencies. This was accompanied by the defection from the League of the Catholic Defence Association (to their detractors, "the Pope's Brass Band"). Lucas's decision to take a complaint against Cullen to Rome further alienated clerical support.

To Duffy the cause of the Irish tenants, and indeed of Ireland generally, seemed more hopeless than ever. In 1855 he published a farewell address to his constituency, declaring that he had resolved to retire from parliament, as it was no longer possible to accomplish the task for which he had solicited their votes. To John Dillon he wrote that an Ireland where McKeogh typified patriotism and Cullen the church was an Ireland in which he could no longer live. In 1856 Duffy and his family emigrated to Australia.

In the 1857 general election, with a recovery in agricultural prices blunting the enthusiasm of farmers for agitation, those presenting themselves as Independent Irish managed to hold on to 13 seats. One seat was won in the north on a platform of the three F's. Samuel MacCurdy Greer was returned for Londonderry City. But Greer identified with the pro-Union British Radicals not with the IIP. The Independent Irish MPs had been under the notional leadership of George Henry Moore. Within the Catholic Church, Moore had retained sufficient support from Cullen's rival, Archbishop John MacHale of Tuam, for his reelection in 1857 to overturned in the House of Commons on the grounds of "obtrusive" and "unseemly" clerical influence.

The IIP never developed the organisation and leadership to get out their full vote in the Commons or to collect, when the opportunity arose, the support of other MPs. In a vote of confidence in the Lord Derby's second Conservative government on 31 March 1859 the rump of the party split seven against six on whether join Whig and Radical factions in bringing in a new Liberal ministry under Lord Palmerston. This marked the end of any pretence to coherence, although as a faction in Irish politics the Independent Oppositionists endured until 1874.

In the Landlord and Tenant Law Amendment (Ireland) Act 1860 the new Palmerston government did no more than confirm contract law as the basis for tenancies. Legislation of the three F's awaited the Land War of the 1880s, agitation conducted by the new Irish National Land League in alliance with the home-rule Irish Parliamentary Party.

== Legacy ==
Historian F. S. L. Lyons concludes that when, in 1858, the Conservatives returned to office with a stable majority, "the hollowness of the independent party's pledge" was exposed. The "temptation to trade Irish votes for Irish concessions" proved in the end "irresistible". Nothing had been achieved, a failure, he argues, that "killed for nearly a generation any belief in the value of parliamentary pressure".

In the Long Depression of the 1870s there was an intensified Land War. From 1879 it was organised by the direct-action Irish National Land League, led by the southern Protestant Charles Stewart Parnell, but from which tenant-righters in the north stood largely aloof. In 1880, Parnell began to coin electoral gains from the struggle. Sixty-four Home Rulers were elected, twenty-seven of whom were his supporters. In the 1885 election, with the size of the Irish electorate tripled by the Representation of the People Act 1884, Parnell marshalled an Irish Parliamentary Party of 85 Members. But the Independent Irish Party was "in no way an ancestor". Parnell's policy was explicitly, and to mind of many British parliamentarians, cynically, of trading, Irish votes for Irish concessions backed, when these were not forthcoming, of obstructionism.

== Prominent parliamentary members ==
- Charles Gavan Duffy, August 1850 – November 1855
- William Keogh, July 1852 – December 1852
- George Henry Moore, October 1855 – April 1857
- John Maguire, April 1857 – June 1859
- John Sadleir, July 1852 – December 1852

== Election results ==
Election	House of Commons	Seats	Government	Votes
1852	16th Parliament	48 / 105	Conservative victory	
1857	17th Parliament	13 / 105	Whig victory	
