= Tenant Right League =

Organisation of Irish tenant farmers which fought for land reform (1850–59)

- Irish Tenant Right League
- Formation: 1850; 176 years ago
- Founded at: Dublin, Ireland
- Dissolved: 1859; 167 years ago
- Key people: William Sharman Crawford, Charles Gavan Duffy, Frederick Lucas, James MacKnight
- Affiliations: Independent Irish Party

The Tenant Right League was a federation of local societies formed in Ireland in the wake of the Great Famine to check the power of landlords and advance the rights of tenant farmers. An initiative of northern unionists and southern nationalists, it articulated a common programme of agrarian reform. In the wake of the League's success in helping return 48 pledged MPs to the Westminster Parliament in 1852, the promised unity of "North and South" dissolved. An attempt was made to revive the all-Ireland effort in 1874, but struggle for rights to the land was to continue through to the end of the century on lines that reflected the regional and sectarian division over Ireland's continued place in the United Kingdom.

== Background ==
The immediate occasion for the formation of the League was the Incumbered Estates (Ireland) Act 1849. The legislation failed to acknowledge the Ulster tenant right. The un-codified custom in Ireland's northern province restrained the freedom of landowners to rack rent and to evict paying tenants at will. It also allowed that in working his holding a tenant acquired an interest, a "right", that he might sell on at the end of his tenancy. Typically this took the form of demanding from the incoming tenant a lump sum payment (often as high as £10 an acre) that might, for example, be enough cash to allow the outgoing tenant to take his family to America.

Supporters argued that by granting farmers a degree of security and by allowing them to at least share in the benefits of their own improvements to the land (clearing, fencing, drainage etc.), the tenant right was the key to Ulster's relative prosperity. Attacks upon it by landowners and land speculators had provoked serious agrarian disturbances in the 1770s, the Hearts of Steel disturbances, and in the 1830s these had begun to recur with a new tenant fraternity, the "Tommy Downshire Boys".

The 1849 act had been preceded in 1843 by the Devon Commission, which in its report on the Irish land system rejected the Ulster Custom as dangerous to "the just rights of property". Landlords who followed the commission suggestion and chose either to ignore or to trivialise the custom, had had their actions upheld by the courts. Against this background, and with additional distress of the enveloping Famine that bore down on those still able to sustain themselves in rising Poor Law rates, otherwise loyal Protestant farmers interpreted the omission of the tenant right from the act as an existential threat. Increasing evictions (of which there were officially over 100,000 in 1849). also provoked new tenant protection societies (commonly under the guidance of local Roman Catholic clergy) in the south for whom an extension of the Ulster Custom was a minimum demand.

The Young Ireland veteran Charles Gavan Duffy was persuaded by the initiative of James MacKnight, editor of the Londonderry Standard, William Sharman Crawford MP, a progressive County Down landlord, and group of radical Presbyterian ministers, that there was a basis for a national movement. In his paper The Nation Duffy reproduced an address by their newly formed Ulster Tenant Right Association in which McKnight proposed that "all proprietary right has its foundation in human labour'" and that, "as a public institution, created by state", landlordism should be "regulated by law".

== The "League of North and South" ==
Together with Frederick Lucas, former Quaker and founder of the progressive international Catholic weekly, The Tablet, and John Gray, owner of the leading nationalist paper, the Freeman's Journal, Duffy and MacKnight issued writs for a national tenant-right convention.

The convention met on September 8, 1850, in the City Assembly House at Dublin. Duffy recalls "upwards of forty members of Parliament, about two hundred Catholic and Presbyterian clergymen, and gentlemen farmers, traders, and professional men from every district in the country" answering "the call".

Reserved, stern Covenanters [Presbyterian traditionalists] from the North, ministers and their elders for the most part, with a group of brighter recruits of a new generation, who came afterwards to be known as Young Ulster, sat beside [Catholic] priests who had lived through the horrors of a famine which left their churches empty and their graveyards overflowing; flanked by farmers who survived that evil time like the veterans of a hard campaign; while citizens, professional men, the popular journalists from the four provinces, and the founders and officers of the Tenant Protection Societies completed the assembly.

With MacKnight presiding, the assembled formed the all-Ireland Tenant Right League. A council was elected of 120 representatives from the four Irish provinces, dedicated to a reform of land tenure popularly summarised as the "Three F's".

- Fair Rent (assessed by land value and fixed to prevent the rack renting of tenant improvements)
- Fixity of Tenure (so long as the fair rent is paid)
- Free Sale (the right of farmers to sell their "interest" in their holding to an incoming tenant).

Although free sale (the Ulster Custom) implied that tenants possessed property rights in land they did not legally own, the League programme did not touch directly on the question of land ownership. Neither did it address the distress of the landless and un-enfranchised rural majority: "cottiers", "farm servants" and their dependants. Their interests were the subject of a resolution promising only, at some early opportunity, consideration of "some measure for their permanent protection and improvement. Despite its populist rhetoric, the League consisted "almost exclusively of well-off farmers", and could be represented by "improving landowners" such as William Sharman Crawford in County Down and George Henry Moore in County Mayo.

County meetings in Wexford and Kilkenny hosted MacKnight, the Rev. David Bell, John Rogers and other Presbyterian ministers who the Belfast News Letter accused of endeavouring, “to inspire a bitter hatred against the class" of landlords, and of advocating theories, “calculated to stir up animosities between the landlord and the tenant classes", "infinitely more bitter", than any previously. Bell returned the favour inviting Catholic delegates from the south to an assembly of tenant farmers at Ballybay, in County Monaghan, where, Duffy enthused, "resolutions were proposed by Masters of Orange Lodges, and seconded by Catholic priests".

The Tenant Right League built in strength under its national organiser, the Young Irelander from Newry, John Martin. It had the support of the surviving Repealers in the British House of Commons; and of a number of English Radicals. In the House of Commons, the Radical leader John Bright noted in the wake of the Dublin convention that "Instead of the [tenant-right] agitation being confined, as heretofore to the Roman Catholics and their clergy, Protestant and Dissenting clergymen seem to be amalgamated with Roman Catholics at present; indeed, there seems an amalgamation of all sects on this question", and he advised the House to "resolutely legislate on it."

In the 1852 general election, the League appeared to triumph. Some 48 Tenant-Right candidates, including Duffy and Lucas, were returned to parliament having taken the pledge "to hold themselves perfectly independent of, and in opposition to, all governments which do not make it part of their policy and a cabinet question to give the tenantry of Ireland a measure embodying the principles" of a tenant-right bill that Sharman Crawford (then MP for Rochdale in England) had unsuccessfully proposed in 1852.

== Disaffection in the north, secession in the south ==
The engagement of Ulster Protestants, though considerable to begin with, soon fell away. Of the 48 pledged MP who from 1852 were to sit at Westminster as the Independent Irish Party only one had been returned from Ulster: William Kirk from Newry where, despite the property franchise, the Catholic vote was determinant. In Monaghan, Bell was to find that of his 100 congregants who had signed the requisition asking John Gray to stand in their constituency only 11 voted for him. In County Down, Sharman Crawford had his meetings broken up by Orange vigilantes. In the 1857 general election Samuel MacCurdy Greer won on a platform of the three F's in the City of Derry, but it was by identifying with the British Radicals (later the Liberal Party) not with the IIP. "In language reminiscent of 1798", Presbyterian journalists, tenants and ministers roundly denounced Irish landlords, and their auxiliaries, the established Church of Ireland and the Orange Order, and they did not desert the tenant cause. John Rogers (of Comber) who likened landlords to "locusts that came up on Judea" and who saw in the Tenant League a "union of north and south in one glorious brotherhood for the regeneration of their common country" was to be elected Moderator of the Presbyterian Church in 1863, replacing Henry Cooke who had accused him of preaching communism, and again in 1864.

But for an all-Ireland tenant league, an early difficulty in the north was the campaign for the repeal of the Ecclesiastical Titles Act 1851 in which Lucas and several prominent League members of the Catholic Defence Association were involved. Together with the presence of so many Repealers (ready to support a Catholic-majority parliament in Dublin), the determination to remove restrictions on the titles assumed by a revived Catholic episcopate in both Ireland and Great Britain heightened the suspicion that the League was being used for political purposes beyond its declared agenda. It was the case as well that landowners in the north threatened to withdraw their consent for the existing Ulster Custom if their Conservative nominees were not elected, and that they had League electoral meetings broken up by Orange "bludgeon men". In November 1852, Lord Derby's short-lived Conservative government introduced a land bill to compensate Irish tenants on eviction for improvements they had made to the land. The Tenant Compensation Bill passed in the House of Commons in 1853 and 1854, but failed win consent of the landed grandees in the House of Lords. The bill had little impressed the League and its MPs as landlords would be left free to pass on the costs of compensation through their still unrestricted freedom to raise rents.

Holding the balance of power in the House of Commons, the Independent Irish MPs voted to bring down the government. But in the process two of the leading members, John Sadlier and William Keogh, broke their pledges of independent opposition and accepted positions (respectively as a junior Lord of the Treasury and as Solicitor General) in a new, on the issue of tenant rights equally unsympathetic, Whig-Peelite administration. Significantly in a League debate in February 1853 MacKnight, wary of any sign of Irish separatism, did not support Duffy in condemning these desertions. Rather, he protested the increasingly strident nationalism of southern League spokesman and their supporters.

The Catholic Primate, Archbishop Paul Cullen, who had been sceptical of the independent opposition policy from the outset, sought to rein in clerical support for the remaining IIP in the constituencies. This was accompanied by the defection from the League of the Catholic Defence Association (to it detractors, "the Pope's Brass Band"). Lucas's decision to take a complaint against Cullen to Rome only further alienated clerical support.

== Collapse ==
Neither the League nor its parliamentary grouping survived the decade. Lucas died in October 1855 shortly after the failure of his mission to Rome. A month later Duffy published a farewell address to his constituents, declaring that it was no longer possible to accomplish the task for which he had solicited their votes He emigrated to Victoria, Australia, where on a platform of land reform he re-entered politics.

By 1856, the parliamentary strength of the independents had dwindled to a dozen. When, in 1858, the Conservatives returned to office with a stable majority, "the temptation to trade Irish votes for Irish concessions became in the end irresistible".

David Bell left for England where in 1864 he was inducted by Jeremiah O'Donovan Rossa into the Irish Republican ["Fenian"] Brotherhood, and from 1867 lived in exile in the United States

== Attempted revival ==
Agricultural prices began to rise from 1853, and were given an additional stimulus by the onset of the Crimean War in the following years. Tenant-right agitation died down. MacKnight remained active in a movement for whom the notorious Derryveagh evictions of 1861 served as a sharp reminder of the still unrestricted power of the landowner. Shortly before MacKnight's death, and as agrarian conditions again deteriorated, there was an attempt to revive an all-Ireland league. In January 1874, the Route Tenants Defence Association (Ballymoney) for whom MacKnight had been an inspiration, organised a major North-South National Tenants Rights conference in Belfast. In addition to the three F's, resolutions called for loans to facilitate tenant purchase of land and for breaking the landlord monopoly on local government. Once again there was a determination to organise parliamentary constituencies so as to return Members pledged to tenant rights. The challenge, however, came sooner than expected. A general election was called for February.

In the south the tenant programme was adopted by candidates of the new Home Rule League, while in the north it was championed by Liberals. Conscious that the [secret] Ballot Act 1872 had weakened the landlords' authority, Conservatives expressed a willingness to give the Ulster Custom legal force. But as in 1852, they relied heavily on confusing tenant-righters with Catholic nationalists and their separatist cause.

The Conservatives triumph in Ulster was not as complete as in 1852: two tenant-right Liberals were returned from County Londonderry, and in Down James Sharman Crawford succeeded where in 1852 his father William had failed. However, in the south and west the tenant-right movement clearly aligned with Home Rulers. With the formation in 1879 of the Irish National Land League the struggle for rights to the land advanced under the openly nationalist leadership of Michael Davitt and Charles Stewart Parnell.

The second Land Act, the Land Law (Ireland) Act 1881 (44 & 45 Vict. c. 49), introduced by William Ewart Gladstone conceded free sale, improved security of tenure, and introduced a machinery for arbitrating rent. Finding themselves reduced to not much more than a receiver of rents, landlords denounced the concessions as "confiscation". For tenants in Ulster, including Protestants who had flocked to Land League meetings only the year before, the act was seen as fulfilling their key demands and they immediately used the act to adjust rents. After a few years' experience of the act land agitation revived in the south and west, but the basis for cooperation with Protestant tenants in the north had been further reduced.
