= Samuel MacCurdy Greer =

Irish politician

Samuel McCurdy Greer

Member of Parliament for County Londonderry
- In office 1857 – 14 May 2001 Serving with James Johnston Clark
- Preceded by: Theobald Jones; James Johnston Clark
- Succeeded by: Sir Frederick Heygate, Bt; Robert Peel Dawson

Personal details
- Born: 1810
- Died: 1880 (aged 69–70)
- Party: Radicals
- Other political affiliations: Liberal Party
- Education: Belfast Academy
- Alma mater: Glasgow University

Samuel MacCurdy Greer (1810–1880) was an Irish politician who, in Ulster, championed Presbyterian representation and tenant rights. He was a founder member of the Ulster Tenant Right Association and of the all-Ireland Tenant Right League. He served as a MP in the House of Commons of the United Kingdom on a tenant-right platform for County Londonderry.

== Background ==
Samuel MacCurdy Greer was the eldest son of the Rev. Thomas Greer, Presbyterian minister of Dunboe, and Elizabeth Caldwell, daughter of Captain Adam Caldwell, R.N. He was born at Springvale near Castlerock, County Londonderry, in 1810, educated at the Belfast Academy and Glasgow University, and was called to the Irish Bar in 1833.

== Tenant righter ==
Greer entered public life in the wake of the Great Irish Famine which, together with a drop in agricultural prices, compounded the poverty and insecurity of tenant farmers. With James MacKnight, editor of the Londonderry Standard, William Sharman Crawford MP, a progressive County Down landlord, and group of radical Presbyterian ministers, in 1847 Greer formed the Ulster Tenant Right Association. The association called for rent reductions, and for the codification of the Ulster tenant right, the customary understanding that gave tenants a saleable interest in the land they had worked.

When Downhill Castle, owned by the Tory landlord Sir Harvey Bruce, was burned down in a malicious fire, Greer made a name for himself by waging a successful legal campaign against the attempt of the landlord-controlled county Grand Jury to place the cost of its rebuilding on the local taxpayer. He was invited to share platforms with MacKnight and to join in a delegation to London to press the case for rent controls.

In 1850, Greer accepted Charles Gavan Duffy's invitation to form an all-Ireland Tenant Right League. This was to bring Ulster tenant righters into what proved an uneasy alliance with southern tenant protection societies and with prominent supporters, like Duffy, of a restored and reformed (and perforce Catholic-majority) Irish Parliament.

== Radical and Liberal Party politician ==
In the 1852 general election Greer stood on the tenant right platform. But in the face of organised, sometimes violent Orange opposition, Duffy's promised "League of North and South" failed to deliver. Of the 48 League-supported MPs returned to Westminster as the Independent Irish Party (many of them sitting Repeal MPs), only one represented an Ulster constituency, William Kirk for Newry. In the south, the clericalist Catholic Defence Association further split the movement. Politically isolated, in 1856 Duffy took his commitment to land reform to Australia.

While supportive of the legislative union with Great Britain, Greer was not prepared to enter into the pan-Protestant unionist alliance urged by the sometime Presbyterian Moderator, Henry Cooke. Too many Church of Ireland members insisted on the prerogatives not only of landlords, but also of their established church, the costs of which, borne by landowners, were passed to the tenant in higher rents.

When in a by-election for County Londonderry in 1857, Greer next stood on a tenant-right platform it was with the endorsement of the Presbyterian Representation Society. This has been formed, over the objections of Cooke, to "secure Parliamentary representation, and a recognition of their claims to public offices and appointments, for the Presbyterians of Ireland". He was not successful at the by-election.

Supported by MacKnight, Greer was successful in taking one of the county's two seats in the general election later the same year as a Radical. In Britain, the Radical leader John Bright had, at the outset, endorsed the League's tenant right programme. With even Orangemen supporting the tenant right (forty were expelled from the Order for declaring for Greer in then still open balloting) he edged out the Conservative Sir Harvey Bruce, 2,339 votes to 1,676. Two years later, standing for the Liberal Party his vote dropped from a third to a quarter of the ballot, and the Conservatives regained both seats. His loss to the Tory landlord-nominee James Johnston Clark led to the withdrawal of many Presbyterians from politics.

In 1860 in 1860 Londonderry City by-election, Greer tried to succeed the Whig MP Sir Robert Ferguson, but the Conservative candidate William McCormick, who employed a significant number of Catholic workers, managed to split the Catholic vote and defeated Greer with a majority of 19.

Although failing to win office as a Liberal, Greer promoted the party in Ulster. It was the vehicle through the first of the Irish Land Acts was secured in 1870. This met one of the central demands of the Ulster Tenant Right Association. It gave the Custom of Ulster, which restricted the opportunity to rack-rent tenant improvements, the force of law. In 1872, the Gladstone administration also introduced the Ballot Act 1872, which reduced the intimidatory power of landlords and employers through the use of the secret ballot.

In 1870 Greer accepted the recordership of Londonderry, until 1878, when he was appointed county court judge of County Cavan and County Leitrim. He died in 1880.

Parliament of the United Kingdom
Preceded by James Johnston Clark; Theobald Jones	Member of Parliament for County Londonderry; 1857 – 1859; With: James Johnston Clark	Succeeded by Sir Frederick Heygate, Bt; Robert Peel Dawson
