= James MacKnight (agrarian reformer) =

Irish journalist (1801–1876)

- Born: 27 February 1801; Rathfriland, County Down, Ireland
- Died: 8 June 1876 (aged 75); Derry, Ireland
- Education: Belfast Academical Institution
- Occupation: Newspaper editor
- Organization(s): Belfast News Letter, Londonderry Standard, Banner of Ulster
- Notable work: The Ulster Tenants' Claim of Right; or, Landownership A State Trust (1848)
- Movement: Ulster Tenant Right Association, Irish Tenant Right League

James MacKnight (M'Knight, McKnight, MacNeight) (1801–1876) was an Irish journalist and agrarian reformer whose call for Fair Rent, Fixity of Tenure and Free Sale ("the Three Fs") briefly surmounted Ireland's political and sectarian division. In the United Kingdom general election of 1852 the all-Ireland Tenant Right League, which MacKnight formed in a joint initiative with Charles Gavan Duffy, helped return 48 pledged MPs. Pulled between Catholic and nationalist sentiment in the south and the strength of Protestant and unionist feeling in the north, the League and its Independent Irish Party did not survive the elections of 1857. In Ulster, MacKnight supported tenant-right candidates committed to the legislative union with Great Britain, while remaining sharply critical of British government efforts to address Ireland's continuing agrarian crisis. "All proprietary right", he argued, "has its foundation in human labour'".

== Newspaperman, Belfast and Derry ==
MacKnight was born near Rathfriland, County Down, the son of Irish-speaking Presbyterian smallholder. He aspired to the Presbyterian ministry, and after reading Greek and Latin at the school of David Henderson in Newry (some years ahead of John Mitchel), in 1825 entered the collegiate department of the Belfast Academical Institution (established on liberal principals by the former United Irishman, William Drennan). Deficient in extempore preaching, MacKnight changed course. In 1829 he joined Belfast's leading paper, the News-Letter, becoming its editor within the year.

At the News Letter MacKnight maintained criticism of the undisputed leader of Catholic Ireland, Daniel O'Connell. He depreciated O'Connell's focus on repeal of the Acts of Union, with the prospect it entailed of a Catholic-majority parliament in Dublin. MacKnight believed that patriotic sentiment might have been better channelled into a revival of the Irish language (something for which O'Connell had declared himself "sufficiently utilitarian" to have no interest).

At the same time (albeit in pamphlets that were pseudonymous), MacKnight sided with the O'Connellites, defending Catholics, in the face of Protestant outrage over the teaching at Maynooth of the 18th century, allegedly inquisitorial, theologian, Pierre Dens. He suggested that the alarm over Dens was being driven by those determined to derail municipal reform, preserve the Ascendancy privileges of the Church of Ireland, and "beguile half-informed Protestants into Orangeism". Their "Roman Catholic countrymen would never be party to any scheme" for doing Protestants "civil or political injustice".

At odds with the unionist but Tory proprietors of the News Letter, in 1846 MacKnight moved to Derry where he was to edit the Londonderry Standard (1846–1847, 1854–1876). The paper advocated "the interests of the orthodox presbyterians of Ireland" in implicit opposition both to unitarianism and to the pan-Protestant political union with the Anglican Ascendancy proposed by the sometime Presbyterian Moderator, Henry Cooke. From 1848 he also edited the Banner of Ulster (a twice-weekly journal set up as the organ of the General Assembly of the Presbyterian Church) attacking in his first editorial the violent anti-popery of the proselytising "home missions". Both papers had excoriated landlords, including the powerful Marquis of Londonderry, for failing to reduce rents during the Great Famine, proposing that "landownership is, to a certain extent, a public trusteeship". It was an editorial line MacKnight continued.

== The Tenant Claim of Right ==
With William Sharman Crawford MP, MacKnight formed the Ulster Tenant Right Association supported by a group of radical Presbyterian ministers. In a pamphlet published by the Association in March 1848, The Ulster Tenant's Claim of Right, MacKnight, citing natural law, argued "all proprietary right has its foundation in human labour'" and that "Aristocracy and landlordism, must be based upon realised, PUBLIC UTILITY". He also remarked that Ireland was the only country in the world where, 'the bulk of the population are treated as aliens on the soil of their birth'".

In Ireland, it was the tenant, not the landlord, who expended every penny on improvements which enriched the landlord's property: this was, "the customary fate of Irish tenant industry, even in Ulster itself; while this barefaced, revolting robbery is openly perpetrated by men, who, in the British Parliament, are wont to boast of their own superior landlordism, and who clutch at Coercion Bills, with a greedy avidity". McKnight painted a vivid picture of the effects on the tenant of having no assured interest in the soil: "..when they see all their industry, and all their toil, beyond the bare means of the merest crawling subsistence, regularly going to the pampering and enrichment of a small privileged oligarchy, who have no sympathy with them beyond that which men usually bestow upon animals of an inferior species, they quickly lose the spirit of self-exertion".

The three Fs were to be the basis for a new agrarian settlement: '"Landlordism, as a public institution, created by state, shall be regulated by law". At a dinner in Derry to honour Crawford for his single-handed legislative efforts, MacKnight did not hesitate to invoke the alternative to legal redress, the activities of the Hearts of Steel and, more recently, of the "Tommy Downshires'" who meted out their own justice to landlords and their agents. Large extracts of MacKnight's pamphlet were published by Charles Gavan Duffy in his nationalist weekly, The Nation. With other Young Irelanders remaining in Ireland following their abortive Famine Rebellion in 1848, Duffy was convinced that for Ireland the tenant's struggle was existential, and that it was a basis on which Protestant and Catholic, North and South might unite in a national movement.

== The League of North and South ==
In 1842 Duffy had already allied himself with James Godkin who had abandoned a Bible mission to campaign for the rights of the Catholic tenants he had been tasked with bringing into the Protestant fold. He now looked to McKnight and to Crawford. Together they called a convention in Dublin to which upwards of forty members of Parliament, and about two hundred Catholic and Presbyterian clergymen responded. With McKnight presiding, the assembled formed the all-Ireland Tenant Right League dedicating to securing concession of his "three F's’".

In the elections of November 1852, what he had optimistically called the "League of North and South" helped return Duffy (for New Ross) and 47 other pledged MPs to Westminster. But despite the efforts of MacKnight in Derry, of Crawford in County Down, of the Rev. David Bell in County Monaghan and of others across the province, only one (William Kirk for Newry) was returned from Ulster. In the north they had contended with the opposition, sometimes violent, of the Orange Order, and with the threat of landlords to withdraw their consent for the existing Ulster Custom if their Conservative nominees were not elected.

In November 1852, Lord Derby's short-lived Conservative government introduced a land bill to compensate Irish tenants on eviction for improvements they had made to the land. The bill passed in the House of Commons in 1853 and 1854, but failed win consent of the landed grandees in the House of Lords. (In the Banner, MacKnight, who had had a low opinion of the bill, nonetheless welcomed it as a first departure in the Commons from the principle that anything beyond the rights of the landlord is a question of private bargain). In the South, Archbishop Cullen approved the Catholic tenant-right MPs breaking their pledge of independent opposition and accepting positions in a new Whig administration. Significantly in a League debate in February 1853 MacKnight, wary of any sign of Irish separatism, did not support Duffy in condemning these desertions. Rather, he protested the increasingly strident nationalism of southern League spokesman and supporters.

In 1855, broken in health and spirit, Duffy published a farewell address to his constituents, declaring that it was no longer possible to accomplish the task for which he had solicited their votes. He and his family emigrated to Australia. David Bell left for England where in 1864 he was inducted by Jeremiah O'Donovan Rossa into the Irish Republican ["Fenian"] Brotherhood.

== Continued commitment to agrarian reform ==
Resuming editorship of the Londonderry Standard in early 1854 (which he continued until his death in 1876), MacKnight remained committed to agrarian reform and was to support tenant-right candidates for Parliament. In the 1857 general election he assisted in the successful campaign in Derry of Samuel MacCurdy Greer. Greer stood on a platform of the three F's but, upholding free trade against the protectionism of the landlords, identified with the British Radicals (and later the Liberal Party), not with the Independent Irish Party.

Greer's ideas were quoted again in criticism of government efforts to address the issues of land tenure in the late 1860s. He influenced James Armour and others in the formation of the Route Tenants Defence Association in Ballymoney in 1869. In 1870 speaking at meetings in Ulster and conferring with William Ewart Gladstone, the prime minister in London, McKnight sought to shape what was to be the first of the Irish Land Acts.

At a tenant right conference in Ballymoney in April 1870, however, his proposed set of resolutions on the completed bill were shelved through the interference of Thomas MacKnight (no relation) and other Liberals, anxious to show party discipline. MacKnight remained outside such party confines and in one of his last public speeches decried the offer of tenant right (to inscribe in law the Ulster Custom of not rack renting tenant improvements) decoupled from secure fixity of tenure: "there is . . . in our social economy an irreconcilable antagonism between free representative institutions and feudal territorialism"

In January 1874 the Route Tenant Defence Association organised a major North-South National Tenants Rights conference in Belfast. In addition to the three F's, resolutions called for loans to facilitate tenant purchase of land and for breaking the landlord monopoly on local government. Once again there was a determination to organise parliamentary constituencies so as to return Members pledged to tenant rights. But when the parliamentary challenge came sooner than expected—a general election was called within a matter of weeks—the sectarian division over restoring a parliament in Dublin re-asserted itself. In the south the tenant programme was adopted by candidates of the new Home Rule League, assisting the Conservatives in the north in confusing tenant-righters with the separatist and Catholic cause. Three tenant-right Liberals were elected in Ulster (including William Sharman Crawford's son James in Down), but they could not be seen to cooperate with tenant struggle in the south. With the formation of the Irish National Land League this was to advance under an openly nationalist leadership.

== Death and family ==
After some months illness MacKnight died on 8 June 1876 in Derry aged 75. He was survived by his wife, the sister of James McPherson, proprietor of the Londonderry Standard. They had no children.
