= William Sharman Crawford =

Irish landowner (1780-1861)

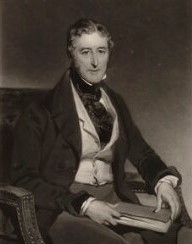
- 1844 mezzotint
- Born: 3 September 1780; Moira Castle, County Down, Ireland
- Died: 16 October 1861 (aged 81); Crawfordsburn, County Down, Ireland
- Known for: campaigning for tenant rights in Ireland as a Radical Member of Parliament
- Spouse: Mabel Crawford
- Father: William Sharman
- Relatives: James Sharman Crawford (son); Mabel Sharman Crawford (daughter)

William Sharman Crawford (1780–1861) was an Irish landowner who, in the Parliament of the United Kingdom, championed a democratic franchise, a devolved legislature for Ireland, and the interests of the Irish tenant farmer. As a Radical representing first, with Daniel O'Connell's endorsement, Dundalk (1835-1837) and then, with the support of Chartists, the English constituency of Rochdale (1841–1852) he introduced bills to codify and extend in Ireland the Ulster tenant right. In his last electoral contest, standing on the platform of the all-Ireland Tenant Right League in 1852 he failed to unseat the Conservative and Orange party in Down, his native county.

== Early life ==
William Sharman Crawford was born on 3 September 1780 at Moira Castle, County Down, the son of William Sharman, landlord, Volunteer colonel and member of the Irish parliament. William Sharman was a leading member of the radical wing of the Volunteer movement who continued, after the grant of legislative independence in 1782, to press for Catholic emancipation and democratic reform.

In 1783, William Sharman chaired the Volunteer convention at Dungannon and assisted by the town's exceptional broad, if still exclusively protestant, "potwalloper" franchise, was returned with William Todd Jones to the Irish House of Commons as a Member for Lisburn. He did not stand again in 1790, but remained active as a Volunteers, presiding over their Fall of the Bastille celebrations in Belfast in 1791, and their second Dungannon convention in 1793.

William Sharman died in 1803. In 1819 his son sold the family estates and moved to Dublin where he became a patron of the philanthropic Royal Dublin Society. Eight years later he returned to County Down as the heir to the estates of his brother-in-law Arthur Johnston Crawford of Crawfordsburn, whose name, Crawford, he added (by royal licence) to his own.

An advocate of Catholic admission to United Kingdom Parliament, William Sharman Crawford publicly supported the Catholic Relief Act of in 1829 and In the following year was strenuous in his efforts as a county magistrate to disperse Orange demonstrations. Local Ascendancy interests (those of the dominant Downshire, Londonderry, and Donegall families) were successful in opposing him as a parliamentary candidate for reform in Down in 1831 and, alongside alongside Robert James Tennent, nephew of the United Irishman William Tennent, in Belfast in 1832.

== Radical MP and democratic suffragist ==
Sharman Crawford had resisted approaches from Daniel O'Connell in 1831 to join in the campaign to repeal of the Act of Union and to restore an independent Irish parliament. He declared that the dissolution of the legislative union would "undermine the connection between Great Britain and Ireland upon which the prosperity, happiness, and security of the country depended" (Northern Whig, 24 Jan. 1831). Sharman Crawford, however, was sufficiently dissatisfied with the pace of reform in Ireland to anticipate outline case for devolved self-government within the United Kingdom: The expediency and necessity of a local legislative body in Ireland (Newry, 1833).

This presaging of the arguments that were later to be "rehearsed in the home rule debates from the 1870s”, was enough for O'Connell to see Sharman Crawford returned in 1835 unopposed as MP for Dundalk. But Crawford sacrificed a future endorsement by criticising O'Connell for the price he appeared willing to pay for Whig favour. While Sharman Crawford had called for the abolition the tithes levied upon tenants for the Anglican establishment (the Church of Ireland in which Sharman Crawford himself was active), rather than embarrass the government of Lord Melbourne O'Connell accepted the Tithe Commutation Act (1838). This sustained the levy as an additional element of rent, albeit at a reduced rate.

Sharman Crawford subscribed to the People's Charter (1838): votes for tenants and working men protected by a secret ballot. As his attempt to create a Chartist body in Belfast with the Ulster Constitutional Association failed in 1840–1. But together with his vocal opposition to the Corn Laws, his support for the Charter gave him standing with the English Radicals. In 1841, they secured him Rochdale, a parliamentary seat in the industrial Lancashire.

He was encouraged when, in April 1842, 67 MPs (Sir Charles Napier and Richard Cobden among them) followed him into the Aye Lobby on his motion for Commons' committee to consider the Charter's Six Points. These he proposed rewriting as a legislative bill of rights. Together with proposals for a union with the Anti-Corn Law League, Fergus O'Connor (the Irish-born leader of the democratic movement) saw the potential replacement of People's Charter as a threat to his position, and Sharman Crawford's move effected a split. In December Sharman Crawford walked out of a joint Chartist and National Complete Suffrage Union (NCSU) delegate conference in Birmingham, along with NCSU leader Joseph Sturge.

With the endorsement of the NCSU, Sharman Crawford introduced his reform bill to "a small and bored House" in May 1843. The measure was lost by 101 to 32. It would be another twenty before Parliament would seriously consider a further extension of the franchise.

== Devolutionist, differences with O'Connell ==
In Ireland, rather than join O'Connell's relaunched Repeal Association, in May 1840 Sharman Crawford and a group of Ulster reformers founded their own Ulster Constitutional Association to further explore the possibilities of a devolutionary compromise. For a time O'Connell appeared sympathetic to a federalist scheme Sharman Crawford outlined in letters to the Northern Whig (12, 14, 16, 19 November 1844). It would have granted Ireland powers similar to those given to Canada in the Union Act of 1840, while retaining her representation at Westminster.

Sharman Crawford's proposal was the basis for discussions with the Young Irelander Thomas Davis. But Davis's colleague at The Nation, Charles Gavan Duffy, forced the issue in an open letter that challenged O'Connell to affirm Repeal as his object. O'Connell responded that if he accepted a "subordinate parliament" it would only be as "an instalment" on an independent legislature: he would "never ask for or work" for anything less.

Sharman Crawford had been more radical than the Repeal leader in opposing the introduction in 1837 of the English Poor Law system of Workhouses. While O'Connell's first objection was that the poor-law charge would ruin a great proportion of landowners, Sharman Crawford suggested that, "framed on the principles of Malthus", the measure had been designed for the purpose of "lessening the population . . . by reducing the poor to such a condition of hardship that they could not live".

In the 1845, there were starker differences between the two on the Colleges Bill, whose non-denominational and secular vision of higher education O'Connell condemned as "Godless". Sharing Davis's conviction that "reasons for separate education are reasons for [a] separate life", Sharman Crawford had supported similar proposals to educate Catholics and Protestants together at the primary level in 1831 when the principal opposition had been from evangelical Protestants.

== Agrarian reformer ==
Sharman Crawford, the owner of more than 6,000 acres in County Down, was a benevolent landlord. He charged moderate rents, encouraged improvements, and never evicted a tenant. Crucially, at a time when it was being increasingly challenged by landowners, Sharman Crawford recognised the Ulster "tenant right". An un-codified feature of tenure in Ireland's northern province, it restrained rack renting and allowed that, by virtue of labour they invested in the land, tenants acquired an "interest" in their holdings that they might freely sell at the end of their tenancy either to their landlord or to the new tenant. Sharman Crawford was convinced that the insurance the "Ulster Custom" offered to the productive farmer was a key to province's relative prosperity.

After his election for Dundalk, Sharman Crawford authored a bill to give tenant right legal force. When returned from Rochdale he did so again. Robert Peel's Tory government responded in 1843 with Devon Commission. In its report on the Irish land system, the commission, composed entirely of landowners, rejected the Ulster Custom, even while recognising its benefits, as dangerous to the "just rights of property".

During the Famine Sharman Crawford pleaded for outdoor relief as alternative to forcing the hungry to abandon the land and enter disease-ridden workhouses. In Depopulation not Necessary (1850), he followed George Ensor and Whitley Stokes in denouncing Malthusian theory, and opposed emigration and land-clearance schemes. Ireland's rural population could be supported if a tax on absentee landlords was used to reclaim wasteland. Appealing to the "British Members of the Imperial Parliament" he wrote:

Will you, with reckless prejudice, be the instruments of exterminating that people over whom you hold the power, in order to carry into effect your favourite theory of consolidating the lands of Ireland for the use of capitalist farmers, and converting the Irish peasants into the hired labourers of these monied masters? The Irish peasant, did I say? Only a very small proportion of those peasants can be employed in that manner, after you have in the same way or other rid yourselves of the surplus.

In 1848 with James MacKnight, editor of the liberal Londonderry Standard, and with the support of a group of radical Presbyterian ministers, Sharman Crawford formed the Ulster Tenant Right Association. In 1849, the failure of the Encumbered Estates Act to acknowledge the Ulster Custom not only agitated the association in the north, it also provoked the new tenant protection societies (commonly under the guidance of local Roman Catholic clergy) in the south for whom an extension of the Ulster Custom was a minimum demand.

With MacKnight and Charles Gavan Duffy, Sharman Crawford was persuaded there was a basis for a national movement. In The Nation, Duffy reproduced an address by the Ulster Tenant Right Association in which MacKnight proposed that "all proprietary right has its foundation in human labour'" and that, "as a public institution, created by state", landlordism should be "regulated by law". With MacKnight presiding, on September 8, 1850 a Dublin convention formed the all-Ireland Tenant Right League.

== Spokesman for the Tenant Right League ==
The Tenant Right League won support in the House of Commons from Sharman Crawford's English fellow-Radicals. In contrast to Repeal, tenant right was an Irish cause that the Radical leader John Bright was prepared to endorse. Noting that it was an issue on which Protestant, Dissenting and Catholic clergy appear to have "amalgamated", he advised the House to legislate on it "resolutely".

In August 1851 Sharman Crawford helped conclude an alliance between the Catholic Defence Association (CDA) and the Tenant League, under which Irish MPs agreed to support a tenant right bill that provided for fair rent and free sale. He introduced this, his seventh tenant-right bill, on 10 February 1852. Attacked again as an infringement of property rights, it was voted down in the Commons.

Conservatives and the Orange Order seized on the League's collaboration with Irish MPs committed to repeal both of the Act of Union of 1800 and of the Ecclesiastical Titles Act 1851 to propose that tenant right was a cover for a separatist Catholic agenda. In the general election of July 1852, they worked to ensure that in Down Sharman Crawford would not deliver for what Duffy had optimistically hailed as the League of North and South. Some 48 Irish MPs were returned pledged "to hold themselves perfectly independent of, and in opposition to, all governments" which did not make passing Sharman Crawford's tenant-right bill a cardinal point of its policy. But only one, William Kirk, represented an Ulster constituency, Newry where, despite the narrow property franchise, the Catholic vote was determinant. In Down, Sharman Crawford's electoral meetings were broken up by Orange "bludgeon men", and landowners threatened to withdraw their consent for the existing Ulster Custom if their Conservative nominees were not elected, The Belfast News Letter (12 May 1852) portrayed Sharman Crawford as "the ally of papists and infidel levelling democrats".

In September 1852 he chaired a major tenant-right meeting in Dublin attended by forty-one MPs and several hundred agrarian activists. After this he surrendered leadership of the movement to William Shee who reintroduced Sharman Crawford's Tenant Right Bill in the Commons on 25 November 1852.

In December 1852, finding themselves holding the balance of power in the House of Commons, the Independent Irish MPs voted to bring down the Conservative ministry of Lord Derby. But in the process two of the CDA leaders, John Sadlier and William Keogh, broke their pledges of independent opposition and accepted positions in a new Whig-Peelite ministry of Lord Aberdeen. Twenty other MPs followed as reliable CDA supporters. Like MacKnight, Sharman Crawford failed to support Duffy in condemning these desertions. He reasoned that the prospects for tenant right legislation might be improved by having advocates in office. Yet from Aberdeen the pledge breakers had accepted an undertaking in regard only to the Ecclesiastical Titles Act.

In 1853 and 1854 tenant compensation measures did pass in the Commons. But the bills, which failed in the Lords, little impressed the League as landlords would have been left free to pass on the costs of compensation through their still unrestricted freedom to raise rents.

== Last years and children ==
From 1853 agricultural prices began to rise, and were further spurred the following year by the onset of the Crimean War. Tenant-right agitation died down and, although still submitting his thoughts on rural poverty and evictions to the press, the ageing Sharman Crawford withdrew from the public life. One of his final public appearances was at a labour rally in Belfast at which he challenged the "oligarchy of the landed and moneyed interest", and urged a return to the non-sectarian and radical politics the town had championed in his father's day.

A life-long Anglican, Sharman Crawford converted to Unitarianism. Together with the conclusion of the Second Opium War, it occasioned what may have been his last public testament. In "My Religious Profession" (1861), he decries the hypocrisy involved in giving Christian sanction to service in the British Army:

When the conduct of man is scrutinised even of men bearing the reputation of the highest degree of respect for religious ordinances, how great are the inconsistencies we witness. How can such men professionally sell themselves to the state to be murderers of their fellow creatures, without regard to the conformity of this act with the will of God. Every man who adopts the army as a profession does this. How can governments carry fire and sword agalnst unoffending communities for the purpose of enlarging dominions or acquiring improved commercial profits (as the British government are doing at this moment in China, and have done for centuries past in India). How can religious parents deliberately educate their sons to enter into this profession.

Sharman Crawford died at his residence at Crawfordsburn on shore of Belfast Lough on 16 October 1861.

His marriage to Mabel Crawford (d. 1844) had produced seven sons and four daughters. In 1874 a reformed and enlarged electorate in Down, voting for the first time by secret ballot, returned his eldest surviving son, James Sharman Crawford, as a tenant-right Liberal. A daughter, Mabel Sharman Crawford, was an adventurer, writer and women's suffragist.

Tenant right, the subject of eight successive bills drafted by Sharman Crawford, was eventually conceded in the Land Acts of 1870 and 1881.

== Works ==
The Expediency and Necessity of a Local Legislative Body in Ireland. Newry, 1833

Observations on the Irish Tithe Bill passed by the House of Commons in the last session of the Imperial Parliament : submitted to the consideration of the electors of Dundalk in letters addressed to William Brett, Esq, Dundalk, John Coleman, 1835.

In Defence of the Small Farmers of Ireland. Dublin: Porter,1839.

Depopulation not necessary: an appeal to the British members of the Imperial Parliament against the extermination of the Irish people. London: Gilpin,1850

== Biography ==
Gray, Peter (2023). William Sharman Crawford and Ulster Radicalism. University College Dublin Press. ISBN 978-1-910820-43-8

Parliament of the United Kingdom
Preceded by William O'Reilly	Member of Parliament for Dundalk; 1835 – 1837	Succeeded by Thomas Nicholas Redington
Preceded by John Fenton	Member of Parliament for Rochdale; 1841 – 1852	Succeeded by Edward Miall
