= David Bell (Irish Republican) =

Irish tenant-right activist

- Born: 1818; Mosside, County Antrim, Ireland
- Died: 1890 (aged 71–72); Brooklyn, New York, USA
- Burial place: Flushing Meadow, New York
- Citizenship: United Kingdom, United States
- Education: Royal Belfast Academical Institution
- Occupations: Presbyterian church minister, journalist
- Notable work: Irish Republic (weekly: Chicago, New York City)
- Political party: Irish Republican Brotherhood (Ireland), Republican Party (United States)
- Movement: Tenant Right League (Ireland), St. Patrick Brotherhood (England), Irish Republican Association (New York)

David Bell (1818–1890) was an Irish tenant-right activist who became both an Irish, and later in the United States a pro-Reconstruction, republican. A Secessionist Presbyterian minister, he was radicalised by his experience of the Great Irish Famine. Bell helped establish the Tenant League in Ulster, but increasingly despaired of constitutional methods. He was inducted into the Irish Republican Brotherhood by Jeremiah O'Donovan Rossa and drawn onto its executive council. In American exile from 1865, he sought to associate physical-force Fenianism with the Radical U.S. Republican agenda of black suffrage and Reconstruction.

== Ireland 1818–1865 ==
=== Presbyterian minister, tenant-right campaigner ===
Bell was born in Mosside, County Antrim, the son of a Secessionist Presbyterian minister Thomas Bell. He was educated locally, and in the Royal Belfast Academical Institution collegiate department. In 1839 he became the Secessionist Presbyterian minister of Derryvalley Presbyterian Church close to his father's hometown of Ballybay, in County Monaghan.

Moved by the "awful spectacles of poverty and wretchedness" in the Famine years of the 1840s, Bell shared platforms with Catholic priests to promote in Ulster the Tenant Right League with its call for fixity of tenure at fair rent. A League meeting he organised in Ballybay in 1850 was overwhelmed by a crowd of 30,000 defying what he decried as the "ruthless powers of our merciless oppressors"—the Established Church landowners and Orangemen.

In the same year, 1850, Bell lobbied Westminster, calling upon the "Imperial Legislature to render the poor man's property as sacred as that of the rich". When Bell was selected Moderator of the Presbyterian Synod of Armagh, the Young Irelander paper, The Nation (24 May 1851), rejoiced at the "intimation of the deep hold which the principles of the League have taken upon the minds of the.. .farmers of Ulster". Yet Bell found himself unable to deliver for what Gavan Duffy had optimistically hailed as the "League of North and South". In 1852 the all-Ireland Tenant Right League helped return Duffy and 49 other tenant-rights MPs to Westminster. Despite efforts of Bell, James MacKnight, William Sharman Crawford and other Protestant activists in the north, none represented the Protestant-dominated Ulster counties.

In the Monaghan election Bell's appeal for unity could not prevail against calls of the Union in danger, and "No Popery". The League candidate, Dr. John Gray, was a Protestant but editor of the pro-Repeal, largely Catholic, Freeman's Journal. Of the one hundred Presbyterians who a signed the requisition asking Gray to stand only eleven had the courage to vote for him.

The unity represented by the League-supported MPs sitting in Westminster as the Independent Irish Party itself proved elusive. In the south, Catholic Primate, Archbishop Cullen approved MPs breaking their pledge of independent opposition and accepting positions in a new Whig administration. In the north League meeting continued to be broken up by Orange "bludgeon men".

In 1853, members of his Presbytery forced Bell to resign his ministry. In 1855 Duffy published a farewell address to his constituency, declaring that he had resolved to retire from parliament, as it was no longer possible to accomplish the task for which he had solicited their votes. Duffy emigrated to Australia.

=== Physical-force republican ===
In Manchester, in the Spring of 1864 Bell met Jeremiah O'Donovan Rossa and swore the oath to the Irish Republican ["Fenian"] Brotherhood. Already, "thoroughly imbued with the radical separatism of the Fenians", he was the editor of the weekly the Irish Liberator, the paper of the IRB-aligned National Brotherhood of St Patrick. Fenians, who were practising Catholics, were resentful of their bishops' vocal hostility to their movement. But they may have regarded as unwelcome Bell's intercession: at a meeting in Dublin in May 1864, Bell opined that "men should be free to follow what forms of religion they pleased; ... free unmolested, even if they believed in no religion at all". Such liberality appeared only to confirm the charge that Fenianism actually encouraged infidelity. Accused, despite his protests, of being critical of the Catholic clergy, his was forced out of the editorship in June 1864. This was not before assuring his London-Irish readership of the basis for renewed republican confidence:

We know our fellow countrymen in American will do their duty; and if we had 400,000 volunteers with rifles in their hands, what then was to hinder [our country from rising] from the ashes of her desolation, with the diadem of freedom on her brow, and the sceptre of sovereignty in her hand.

In pursuit of this vision, and escaping what he understood as an "outcry" raised against him in the St. Patrick Brotherhood as a former Presbyterian minister, in October 1864 Bell was sent on a fund-raising lecture tour, and mission to the Fenians, in the United States.^{1}

Back in Dublin in the summer of 1865, Bell was on the executive council of the IRB, meeting with, Rossa, James Stephens, Thomas Clarke Luby, and Charles Kickham to discuss proposal to issue bonds in the United States "to meet the emergency of an impending fight". Deliberations were cut short in September when police raided the offices of the Irish People and there was a general round up of the Fenians in Dublin. Bell fled first to Paris, then to the United States.

== United States 1866–1890 ==
=== In support of Grant and Reconstruction ===
From 1867, with Michael Scanlon and Patrick William Dunne, Bell began producing the Irish Republic in Chicago. Under the masthead, "A Journal of Liberty, Literature, and Social Progress", and appealing to "Irishmen of advanced opinions", the editorial stance of the weekly differed from other Irish American publications.

Most American Fenians voted for the Democrats and welcomed the journalistic support they had been given by John Mitchel. Having already in Ireland defended the institution of American slavery against the abolitionism of Daniel O'Connell, the former Young Irelander had wholly identified with southern secession. In the Irish Republic, Bell, Scanlon and Dunne promoted the physical-force Fenianism, but they also supported the Radical Republican agenda for Reconstruction, black suffrage and equal rights (and, in addition, disparaged the general clericalism of rival Irish-American papers). They called on their readers to "Get out from among the drove whose drivers are the herds of bigotry and slavery, and stand with the men upon whose banners is traced 'Universal Liberty'".

Their position was strengthened by Republican leaders who in 1865 lionised the Irish taken prisoners in the April and June Fenian raids into Canada, and who called on the Johnson administration to recognise a lawful state of war between Ireland and England. Sensing the opportunity to win over Irish voters (many of whom would have served under his Union command), in 1867 Ulysses S. Grant persuaded Bell and his partners to move the Irish Republic to New York to help his presidential bid in that crucial state.

=== Opposition to Tammany-Hall Fenianism ===
The weekly cautioned readers "interested in the labor question" from associating themselves with John Mitchel (a "miserable man") and with a "diabolical" Democratic plan to impose upon blacks in the South, "as a substitute for chattel slavery, a system of serfdom scarcely less hateful than the institution it is intended to practically prolong". The Democratic Party policy in the South was nothing less than "an attempt to attach to the laborer in America those medieval conditions which even Russia [ Emancipation of the Serfs, 1861 ] has rejected".

Bell, in New York, also criticised the Fenian leadership of John O'Mahony. Although O'Mahony and his paper, The Irish People, did eventually swing behind Grant and the Republicans, Bell did not believe that O'Mahony was convinced of the need to "cleanse" the spirits of the Irish in America: "Let our people fling off the scales of bigotry and declare that all men are entitled to 'life, liberty, and happiness.'"

O'Mahony, however, was ousted as the President of the Fenian Brotherhood in 1866 by a faction led by William B. Roberts, a wealthy New York City dry-goods merchant, which closely identified with the Democratic-Party machine, Tammany Hall. The new president John O'Neill was determined to continue with assaults upon Canada, and to do so without regard to questions about his appropriation of funds or lack of preparation. In this he clearly saw himself opposed by Bell and Scanlon. Writing from a prison cell, where he had been detained on Grant's express order following command of his third Fenian raid into Canada (see Battle of Eccles Hill) in May 1870, O'Neill ascribed to Bell and Scanlon an hostility toward the Fenian Brotherhood "strongly tinctured with ruffianism". In 1867 in New York City, Scanlon (presumably in league with Bell) established a separate Irish Republican Club presided over by Thomas J Masterson a prominent member of the Shoemakers Union and later Secretary of the city's Workingmen's Union.

The Irish Republic ceased publication in 1873. At that point it was clear that indifference in the north to the fate of blacks in the south, economic depression and the scandals of his administration had made it impossible for Grant, in his second term, to continue with reconstruction. In the 1874 mid-term elections the Democrats again swept up Irish votes. In October 1875, as chairman of the Irish Republican Association, Bell issued an address to the Irish citizens of New York City admonishing those who in voting for the Tammany-Hall nominees "allow themselves to become the tool of shameless plunderers".

=== Last years ===
Meanwhile, in Ireland, with Bell's vision of battalions of Irish-American Civil-War veterans landing in Cork dispelled, it also appeared that physical force republicanism had run it course. In March 1879, John Devoy, the head of Clan na Gael, then the main Fenian organisation in America, met with the Irish MPs Joseph Biggar and Charles Stewart Parnell in France to describe a "new departure". The Fenians would abandon plans for armed revolt and support the drive for Irish Home Rule, provided the Home Rule League backed the campaign of tenant farmers against landlords. It was a return to Bell's original Ballybay commitment—the struggle for rights to the land.

In 1844 Bell married (1844) Elizabeth Clarke of Bailieborough, County Cavan; they had at least one son. Towards the end of his life, Bell was again a Presbyterian minister, in Brooklyn, New York, where he died in April 1890, age 72. Bell is buried in Flushing Meadow, New York.

== Notes ==
^{1} David Bell of Ballbay, the subject of this article, has been confused with David Charles Bell, an uncle of Alexander Graham Bell, the inventor of the telephone. In October 1864, Fenian "headquarters" in New York notified members of the tour by David Bell from Ireland, anticipating that it would "have the most stirring and beneficial effect." In his biography of Alexander Graham Bell (Bell: Alexander Graham Bell and the Conquest of Solitude. Cornell University Press, 1990), Robert V Bruce writes: "Whatever the effect of the tour (if it ever came off), one effect of the circular was to lodge David [Charles] Bell, [Alexander's uncle] in the Dublin House of Correction a year later". David Charles Bell (1817–1902), taught English Literature and Elocution at Trinity College Dublin, and apparently did spend some time in prison in Dublin as a result of his own nationalist commitments. According to Bruce, in 1865 he wrote to Alexander's father, his brother Melville Bell, from the prison: "still... looking forward to the proud watchwords—Ireland! Independence!" But we are informed from the source cited (Bell, p. 271), which includes letters Bell wrote to Luby from America, that the tour of the United States did go ahead in October 1864, and that the lecturer was David Bell (no relation) formerly of Ballybay.
