= Margaret Callan =

Margaret Callan may refer to:

- Dorothy Macardle (1889–1958), Irish writer, novelist and playwright, used the pseudonym Margaret Callan
- Margaret Callan (writer) (c. 1817–c. 1883), Irish teacher, nationalist, and writer
