= Melbourne Celtic Club =

The Celtic Club is Australia's oldest Irish Club. It is non-political and secular, catering for those of Irish and Irish/Australian heritage and anyone else with an interest in Irish culture, the Irish contribution to Australia and the wider Celtic family. The club is also aware of its Australian heritage and acknowledges that it stands on the traditional land of the Wurundjeri people of the Kulin Nation.

The Celtic Club logo includes the shamrock and harp of Ireland together with the Southern Cross star constellation representing Australia.

The motto reads 'Pro patria et libertate' (For Fatherland and Liberty) reflecting the Clubs origins as an Irish Home Rule club.

The Club's newly adopted motto is 'Ní neart go cur le chéile' the Irish for 'There is strength in unity'.

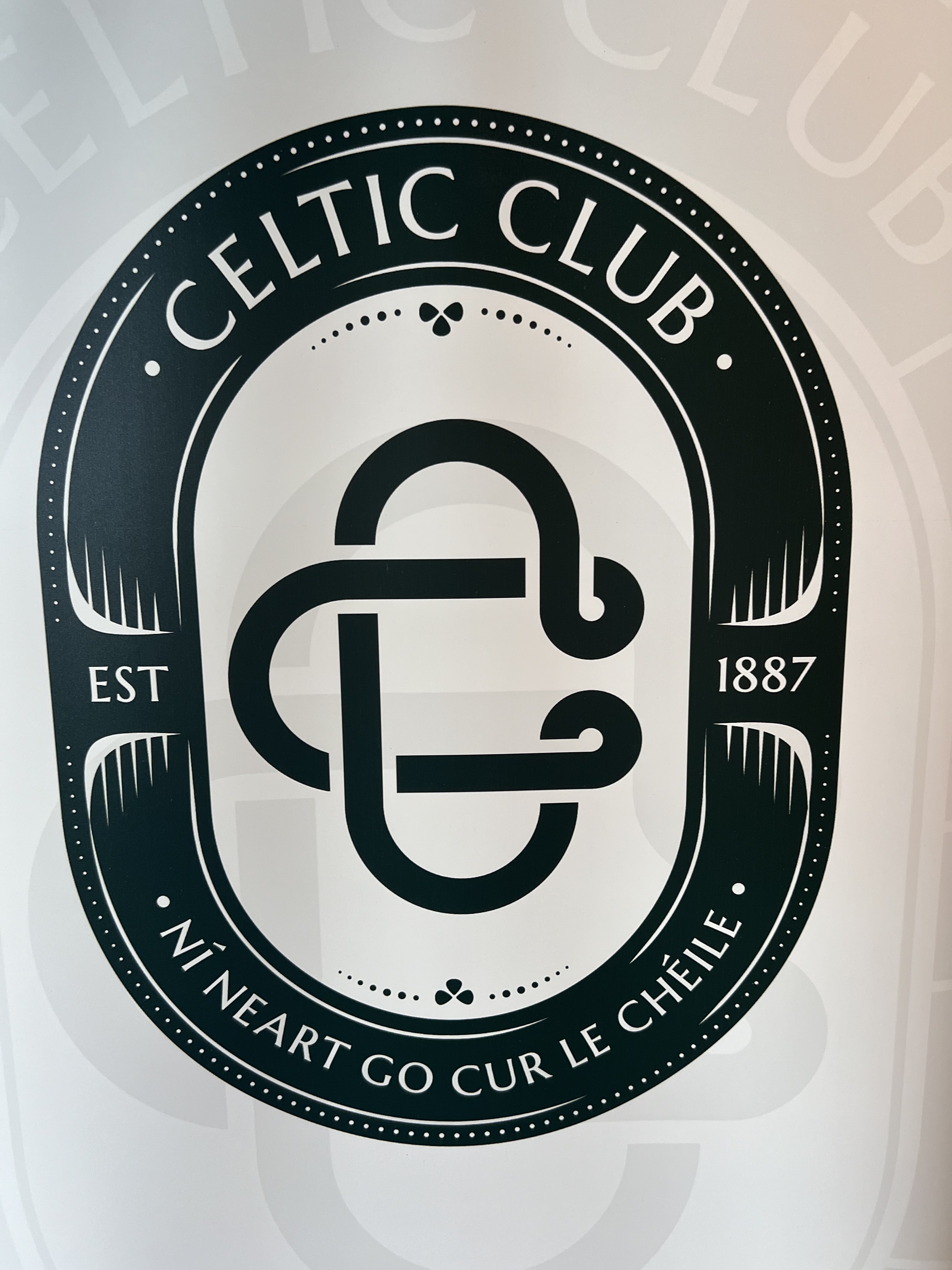
Celtic Club Logo

== Overview ==
Founded on 26 September 1887, the club was originally a semi-political association, supportive of Irish Home Rule among Melbourne's sizeable Irish population; and championing the rights of Irish Australians in an establishment otherwise dominated by the Anglo-Saxon traditions of Great Britain and its colonies. Reflecting this political background, the original name of the club was the 'Celtic Home Rule Club'.

The club had its formal opening in 1888. The founding President was Dr M.U. O'Sullivan KSG. Meetings of the club were originally held at the Imperial Hotel, before the first club rooms were opened at 82 Collins Street. This makes the club the second-oldest (and longest surviving) Irish organisation in Australia, after the Sydney-based Hibernian Society (founded 1880).

The first woman to be elected as President of the Celtic Club was Veronica O'Sullivan in 2014. The first woman to be elected secretary occurred in 1992 with the election of Patricia McWalters who served for four years.

Histories of the club include Hugh Buggy, The Celtic Club – A Brief History, 1947 and D. J. O'Hearn, Erin go bragh – advance Australia fair: a hundred years of growing, Melbourne: Celtic Club, 1990. Both record the key events in the club's history, and the role it played in helping Irish migrants to become accepted into mainstream Australian culture. Histories of the Irish element in Victoria (and Australia more generally) make frequent reference to the importance of the club in maintaining a sense of 'Irishness' in Melbourne, as well as in helping to foster a new identity. The club was also included in Andrew Brown-May and Shurlee Swain's Encyclopedia of Melbourne in 2005.

== Headquarters ==
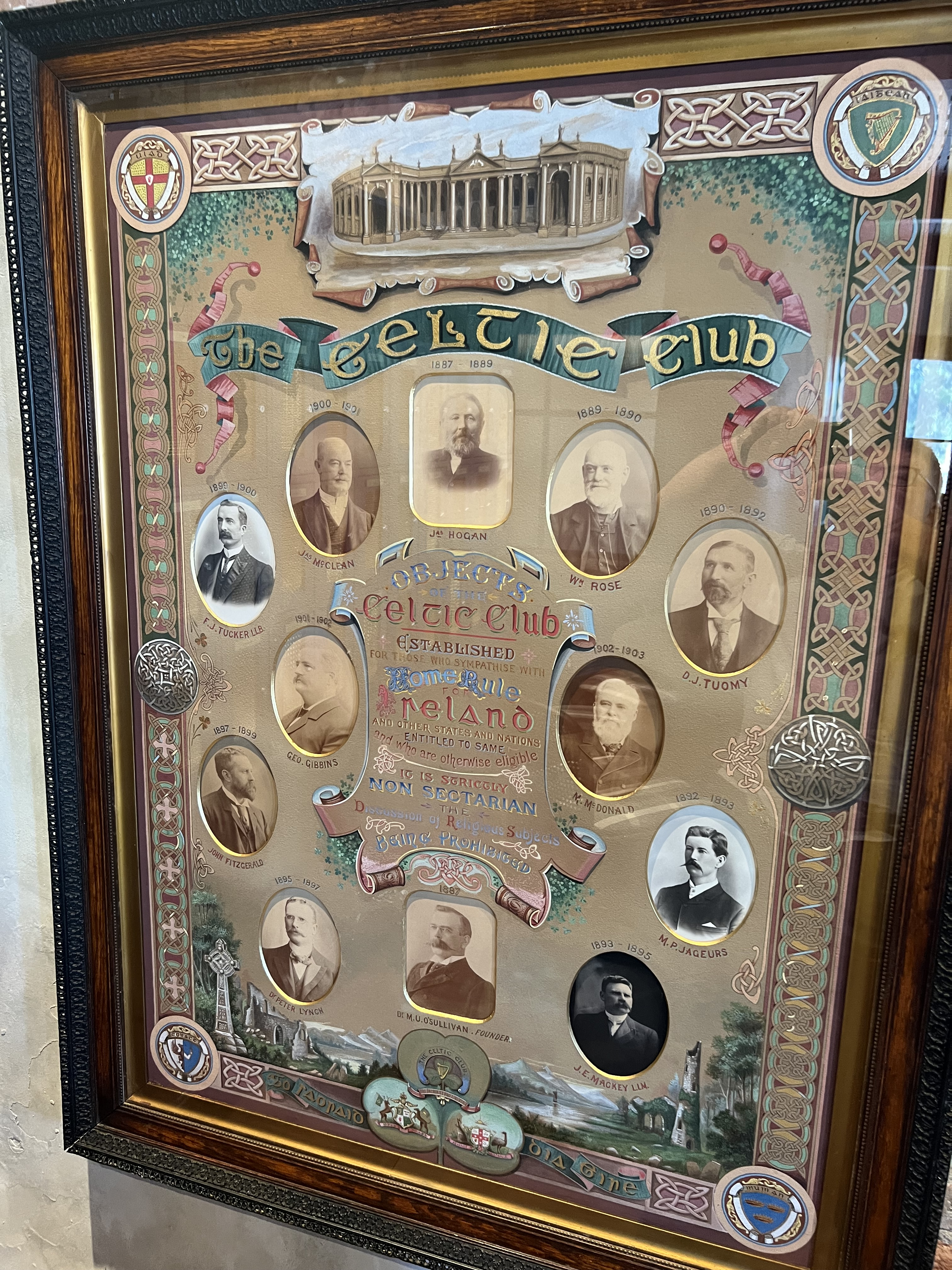
Celtic Club Founders

From 21 December 1959 to September 2017, the club's headquarters were in Queen Street, near the corner of La Trobe Street in the Melbourne central business district. This purchase – of Monahan's New Union Club Hotel – provided the club for the first time with a stable headquarters. The club was open to both members and non-members for meals, drinks and other facilities. The club's membership voted to sell the Queen Street premises to ensure the longer term financial sustainability of the club.

The Celtic Club Melbourne moved to The Metropolitan in North Melbourne while plans for a more permanent home were developed. The club bought The Limerick Arms Hotel in South Melbourne. The Limerick Arms is leased on commercial terms, giving a return to members.

In March 2023 the Celtic Club opened its new premises, The Wild Geese, in Brunswick as its new home and clubhouse. Wild Geese is a term for the Irish diaspora first coined in 1691 following the Treaty of Limerick.

== Current Committee Members ==
President: Patrick McGorry

Vice-President: Ronan McDonald

Treasurer: Fergal Coleman

Secretary: Michael Cooney

Committee Members: Rosemary Sheehan, Nial Finegan (Past President), Lynda Meredith, Aoife Kealy, and James Dunne

== Cultural heritage and Irish language ==
A key aim of the Celtic Club is to support, present and celebrate Irish culture and traditions across the broad spectrum of all Gaelic groups and to recognise and celebrate the great and continuing Australian Irish contribution to the heritage and culture of our country since early settlement.

One of the purposes of the club is "to promote and encourage the Gaelic language", but there are currently no club committees or activities that involve the language.

== Members ==
Famous members of the Celtic Club include Victorian Premier Charles Gavan Duffy; Labor leader Arthur Augustus Calwell; Justice Redmond Barry former North Melbourne Football Club chairman and media personality Ron Casey and Paddy Donnelly, CFMEU organiser and hero of the WestGate Bridge disaster.

== Sources ==
- Bishop, P. (1999) The Irish Empire: the Story of the Irish Abroad, Boxtree: London. ISBN
- O'Farrell, P. (1987) The Irish in Australia, New South Wales University Press: Kensington. ISBN 0868401811.
- O'Hearn, D. J. (1990) Erin go bragh – Advance Australia Fair: a hundred years of growing, Celtic Club: Melbourne.
