= Devon Commission =

Commission researching land lease issues

The Devon Commission (officially 'Commission on Occupation of Land (Ireland)') was a commission that was appointed by Sir Robert Peel to research the problems with land leases. It was formed by proclamation issued 20 November 1843 and reported 14 February 1845.

The Devon Commission was headed by William Courtney, the 10th Earl of Devon. Its 1845 report found that the population of Ireland had increased from six million people to nearly eight million. Similarly they concluded that the leases were unfair and were favourable to the landowners (who were usually Anglo-Irish). The majority of Irish tenants had no form of protection, they could be, and often were, summarily evicted. They also had no claim to the Ulster Custom of landholding - this would have granted tenants the "3F's": Free sale, fixity of tenure, and fair rent. The Devon Commission had wide reaching consequences and though too late to prevent the famine, it did galvanize change afterwards.
