= Frances Cashel Hoey =

Irish novelist, journalist and translator

- Born: Frances Sarah Johnston; 14 February 1830; Bushy Park, Dublin, Ireland
- Died: 8 July 1908 (aged 78); Beccles, Suffolk, England, UK
- Resting place: Little Malvern, England, UK
- Citizenship: United Kingdom
- Occupations: Novelist journalist translator
- Spouse(s): Adam Murray Stewart (1846–1856; his death); John Cashel Hoey (1858–1893; his death)
- Children: 2
- Writing career
- Pen name: Cashel Hoey
- Period: 1865–1886

Frances Cashel Hoey (née Frances Sarah Johnston; 14 February 1830 – 8 July 1908), pseudonym Cashel Hoey, was an Irish novelist, journalist and translator.

== Life ==
Frances Sarah Johnston was born in Bushy Park, Dublin on 14 February 1830. She was one of eight children. Her parents were Charlotte Jane Shaw and Charles Bolton Johnston. He was secretary and registrar at Mount Jerome Cemetery and Crematorium.

In 1853 she began to contribute reviews and articles on fine art to Freeman's Journal, The Nation, and other Dublin papers and periodicals.

On her sixteenth birthday, 14 February 1846, she married Adam Murray "A.M." Stewart, by whom she had two daughters. A.M. Stewart died on 6 November 1856. As a widow, she moved to London and met William Makepeace Thackeray. She soon wrote reviews for the Morning Post, to whose editor William Carleton introduced her, and for The Spectator. A frequent visitor to Paris, on Easter Day 1871 she was the only passenger from London to Paris, and returned next day with the news of the Paris Commune.

On 6 February 1858 she married John Cashel Hoey (1828–1893). Hoey was a devout Roman Catholic, and she converted to his religion. She was granted a civil list pension in 1892, and was widowed the following year. She died on 8 July 1908 at Beccles, Suffolk at the age of 78. She was buried in the churchyard of the Benedictine church at Little Malvern, Worcestershire.

In a previously unpublished letter dated 3 February 1935, commenting on a family photo, George Bernard Shaw wrote:

"I cannot identify the lady in the riding habit, although her face and bearing are so familiar to me that I think I must have seen her. She may be a sister of Charles: they have the same nose and mouth. I never saw Charles: he was a consumptive invalid and did not appear during my few visits to Mount Jerome. The very uncorseted matron on the right is Mrs. Cashel Hoey (Fanny Hoy) Johnston's eldest daughter, who scandalised the family by going to London and earning her living as author (novelist), journalist, reviewer, and "ghost" to literary men who were too lazy to write their own novels, notably Edmund Yates. She became a professed Roman Catholic on marrying Hoey. By her first husband, Stewart, she had a daughter who married a Dublin solicitor named Fottrell. Fanny was a tremendous talker, with the art of making her acquaintances believe that she was intensely interested in them, and that her importance and influence in literary London were limitless. She belonged to a XIX century type of London literary woman now almost extinct. I sketched it rather ill naturedly in one of my early novels, using Fanny as a model for a few superficial traits. Professionally she had to be a bit of a humbug; but she was a good sort in real life."

== Works ==
In 1865, she started a story entitled "Buried in the Deep" for Chambers's Journal, then under the editorship of James Payn. Until 1894 she was a constant contributor, writing articles, short stories, and two serial novels, A Golden Sorrow (1892) and The Blossoming of an Aloe (1894). She wrote eleven novels, writing about high society. Her first novel, A House of Cards (3 vols. 1868; 2nd edit. 1871), two later novels, Falsely True (1870) and The Question of Cain (1882), and her last novel, A Stern Chase (1886), passed into second editions, and some were popular in Canada and the United States.

According to Elizabeth Lee in the old Dictionary of National Biography, Hoey was also largely responsible for Land at Last (1866), Black Sheep (1867), Forlorn Hope (1867), Rock Ahead (1868), and A Righted Wrong (1870). These five novels were published under the name of Edmund Yates. Hoey was sole author of the last work. Eventually, the secret of her authorship was revealed, and she also helped Yates in 1874 to plan, and then write, The World. P. D. Edwards in the Oxford Dictionary of National Biography describes this account, circulated by Anthony Trollope who held a grudge against Yates, as "probably spurious".

Hoey was a reader for publishers at various times, and was the first to send a Lady's Letter to an Australian paper, which she did for 20 years. She also translated 27 works from the French and Italian, seven in collaboration with John Lillie. They include memoirs, travels, and novels.

== Notes ==
Attribution

- This article incorporates text from a publication now in the public domain: Lee, Sidney, ed. (1912). "Hoey, Frances Sarah". Dictionary of National Biography (2nd supplement). Vol. 2. London: Smith, Elder & Co.
