= Evesham Custom =

The Evesham Custom is a distinctive form of customary leasehold tenure used in the market gardens of Evesham, Worcestershire. It is the most well-known of a number of former local practises, such as the Ulster Custom and North Lincolnshire Custom. The underlying principle of such customs was that the tenant could be granted compensation for any improvements they made to the land they leased, since the common law did not provide any such protection.

== Principles ==
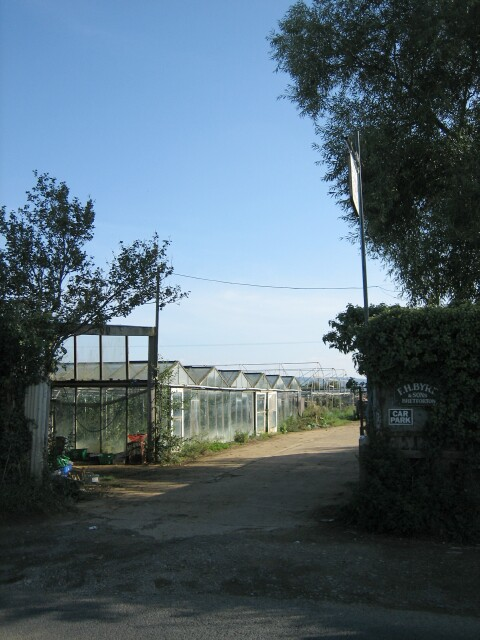
Greenhouses near Bretforton. The Vale of Evesham is noted for a long history of market gardening.

Local customs supplementary to the usual law of leases, such as the Evesham Custom, were seen as having existed over generations in particular areas, being defined as something "to which the memory of man runneth not to the contrary". In the case of Evesham, the custom provided not only a lifetime security of tenure (in a period when market garden leases were generally from year to year, traditionally renewable at Michaelmas) and allowed certain improvements to be made without the landlord's permission, but also ensured that a tenant could be compensated through a system of personal bargaining.

A tenant of a market garden, or other land, under the Evesham Custom has the right to sell their tenancy if the landlord gives their approval, including the right to nominate the new tenant. The payment (known as the "ingoing") made by the incoming tenant includes compensation for any improvements the outgoing tenant has made, such as the planting of fruit trees. The payment also includes a premium for receiving a tenancy offering lifetime security. The entire transaction is made between the outgoing and incoming tenant, with the landlord not involved beyond giving their approval. Furthermore, if the landlord does not accept the new tenant, they are obliged to compensate the outgoing tenant to ensure they did not suffer any financial loss.

This "added value" had the effect of encouraging tenants to further improve their land, by ensuring that they could still realise the full value of the improvements they made if they ended their tenancy. Through this compensation payment and by giving security of tenure, the Custom also gave tenants confidence to invest in crops, like asparagus, that took several years to reach maturity.

From the larger landowner's perspective, the Custom removed from the landlord the trouble and expense of making improvements themselves and the need to negotiate the tenancies of many small garden plots. The Custom helped ensure that Evesham developed a flourishing market gardening industry by the late 19th century, with the price of the tenantright under the Custom often exceeding the freehold value of the land itself.

== History ==
Evesham has a long history of market gardening activity, with some evidence that it was first popularised in the mid 17th century by the activities of a local landowner, Francis Bernardi (former Resident for the Republic of Genoa). By the early 19th century there were a number of gardeners and fruit growers in the Vale. The Custom first appeared in this period, though it was initially understood to be of the nature of a gentlemen's agreement and the landlord had no legal obligation to accept it. Pressure to formalise the customary rights of Evesham's market gardeners increased after an 1870s legal dispute between the owner of land near Evesham Abbey and his tenants, and the basic principles of the Custom were first set down by a special committee of the Vale of Evesham Agricultural Society in 1880.

Although definite records of the Evesham Custom first appear in the early-mid 19th century, some commentators in the past have assumed that the rights originated from "some earlier epoch". The ruralist writer H. J. Massingham, who was familiar with the operation of the Custom, expressed a belief that the tenant rights of Evesham were a direct descendant of those of the "small masters" who from the early mediaeval period practised cultivation in open fields owned by the Abbey. Massingham commented that after the 1874 agricultural depression, the area's large landlords split their farms up and let smaller parcels of land to labourers who were protected by the survival of ancient customary rights and by the local influence of Joseph Arch. J. M. Martin has noted that an "archaic" form of life leasehold was practised in Pershore by the estates of the Duke of Westminster, where wills of the 18th century spoke of a "tenant right of renewing", and that a similarly archaic form of copyhold tenure was found in Shipston-on-Stour on land belonging to the Dean and Chapter of Worcester. Both had survived in areas where large estates had to manage many small tenancies, as in Evesham, and it is possible that a similar local tradition was the source of the rights enjoyed by the Vale of Evesham's market gardeners. Another view states that the Custom originated on a single small estate at the end of the Napoleonic Wars, and subsequently spread throughout the district.

A certain amount of recognition was given by the Small Holdings and Allotments Act 1908, but the Evesham Custom was eventually given statutory expression in s.68 of the Agricultural Holdings Act 1948, which granted tenant farmers security of tenure for life. There were proposals to abolish it in 1949, which generated protest from fruit growers and market gardeners, and which were not eventually followed through. The rights continued under the Agricultural Holdings Act 1986, but on the introduction of the Agricultural Tenancies Act 1995, it was required to create a special exclusion to ensure the continued working of the Evesham Custom, as otherwise an outgoing tenant would not be able to offer a tenancy to an incomer on equivalent terms and security.

== Present day ==
Although the number of market gardens in the Vale of Evesham has declined sharply since the mid 20th century, the Evesham Custom is still observed in tenancies. In 1995, at the reading of the Agricultural Tenancies Bill, the local MP Michael Spicer observed that there were still around 420 tenants potentially affected, and noted that they could expect to realise "ingoing" payments of £200-£300 an acre (at that time, 50% of the land's freehold value). As market gardening has further declined it has become more common for landlords to take over the land at the end of tenancies, and by the mid 2000s, there was evidence that solicitors employed by some landlords were attempting to avoid the traditional operation of the Custom by making minimal compensation payments to outgoing tenants.

== See also ==
- Market garden
- Allotment (gardening)
- Smallholding
- History of English land law
