= Mabel Sharman Crawford =

Irish adventurer, feminist and writer (1820-1912)

- Born: 3 June 1820; Dublin, Ireland, United Kingdom of Great Britain and Ireland
- Died: 14 February 1912 (aged 91); Middlesex, England, United Kingdom of Great Britain and Ireland
- Parents: William Sharman Crawford (father); Mabel Frideswid Crawford (mother)
- Relatives: James Sharman Crawford (brother)

Mabel Sharman Crawford (3 June 1820 – 14 February 1912), was an Irish adventurer, feminist and writer.

== Life ==
She was born Mabel Sharman Crawford on 3 June 1820 in Dublin to William Sharman M.P. and his wife Mabel Frideswid Crawford, a younger daughter in a large family. Her parents took the each other's surnames becoming William and Mabel Sharman Crawford.

Sharman Crawford was an adventurer who liked to travel and took careful notes wherever she went. When she returned from a trip to Tuscany she wrote about it and published it as a book. She did the same with a trip to Algeria. Her charity work with her sisters during the Irish famine informed her views of the places she saw. Sharman Crawford was also a feminist who did not hesitate to call out where she saw sexist whether in the cultures through which she travelled or in her own.

Sharman Crawford was a member of the National Society for Women's Suffrage as a central committee member. She researched into the subject of sentences and actions taken against men who beat their wives and used the results to write the article Maltreatment of Wives for the Westminster Review 139 in 1893. She was also an proponent of the Rational Dress Society.

Mabel Sharman Crawford died 14 February 1912 in Middlesex, England.

== Bibliography ==
- Life in Tuscany (1849)
- Through Algeria (1863)
- The Wilmot family (1864)
- Experience of an Irish landowner (1888)
- Fanny Dennison (1852)
- Rhymed reflections (1921)
- Registry offices : a paper read at the Conference of the National Vigilance Association (1886)
- Social scares (1888)
