= John Cashel Hoey =

John Baptist Cashel Hoey, CMG (Baptised 17 July 1827 – 7 January 1892) was an Irish writer, editor, and public servant for colonial New Zealand and Australia.

Hoey was born in 1827, the eldest son of Cashel Fitzsimons Hoey, of Dundalk, County Louth, Ireland, and Charleston, South Carolina. He was educated at St. Patrick's College, Armagh, and was one of the principal writers for the Nation, and editor 1849–57, taking over from Charles Gavan Duffy, and was one of the "Young Irelanders". From 1865 to 1878 he was sub-editor of the Dublin Review. He was called to the bar at the Middle Temple in 1861.

Hoey was a member of the board of advice and secretary to the Agent-General for Victoria 1872–73 being appointed by Gavan Duffy, and secretary to the Agent-General for New Zealand 1874–79, since when he had been secretary to the Agent-General for Victoria. He was secretary to the London committees for the Melbourne International Exhibition in 1880 and 1888, and to the Colonial Museums Committee.

== Personal life ==
Hoey married, on 9 February 1858, Frances Sarah Stewart (née Johnston). She was the widow of Adam Murray Stewart, of Cromleich, Dublin, who survived him. As Frances Cashel Hoey, she was a well-known author and translator. The couple had no children.

John Cashel Hoey died in London in 1892, aged 63.

== Honours ==
His honours included Knight of the Orders of Malta, d'Este, Pius IX., Francis I., and El Caridad, and a Fellow of the Roman Academy of the Catholic Religion. He was named Companion of the Order of St Michael and St George (CMG), which was conferred in 1881 for his services on behalf of the International Exhibit in Melbourne in 1880.

== Arms ==
Coat of arms of John Cashel Hoey

Notes
Granted 20 December 1862 by Sir John Bernard Burke, Ulster King of Arms
Crest
A unicorn sejant Argent armed and unguled Or gorged with an Irish crown Gules.
Escutcheon
Quarterly 1st & 4th chequy Or and Azure over all a lion rampant Ermine crowned with an Irish crown Gules (Hoey) 2nd & 3rd Gules a lion passant Argent gorged with a collar Sable (Cashel).
Motto
Iterum Iterumqu
