= Margaret Callan (writer) =

Irish nationalist (c.1817–c.1883)

- Born: Margaret Hughes c. 1817; Newry, County Down, Ireland
- Died: c. 1883 (aged 65–66); Melbourne, Australia

Margaret Callan (c. 1817 – c. 1883) was an Irish teacher, nationalist, and writer. She was also known by her pseudonym Thornton MacMahon.

== Biography ==
Margaret Callan was born Margaret Hughes around 1817 in Newry, County Down. She was the daughter of a flax buyer, Phillip Hughes and Susan Gavan. Through her mother, Charles Gavan Duffy was her first cousin. She was from a large family, and following the death of her father meant the family had to support themselves. With her sisters, Callan established a boarding school for girls, the Whitehall Boarding and Day School for Young Ladies, in Blackrock, Dublin in 1835. The school was successful, being advertised The Nation, and Callan espoused nationalist views, like that of the Young Irelanders, in her students. She married a pharmaceutical chemist and apothecary, John B. Callan, whose business was on Merrion Row. He was also an occasional contributor to The Nation.

Through her family, Callan was connected to the Young Ireland movement. Her sister, Susan, married their cousin Gavan Duffy in 1846. Along with her brother, Terence MacMahon Hughes, she wrote for The Nation. Only two articles can be attributed to her with certainty: A day at Versailles (29 July 1843) and A day in Paris (9 Sept. 1843), relating the strong support for Daniel O'Connell and the repeal of the act of union in France. She edited The casket of Irish pearls (1846) under the pseudonym Thornton MacMahon, the name being a dedication to her brother, Terence. This was a collection of Irish prose and verse from James Duffy's Library of Ireland series. In her introduction to the anthology, she dedicated it to "the young men of Ireland", calling on them to organise and educate themselves to show their support and readiness for self-government. Gavan Duffy described her as "a woman of genius", and it was through him that she befriended Thomas Carlyle during his visit to Ireland in 1847. In July 1848 along with Jane Wilde, Callan assumed editorial control of The Nation during Gavan Duffy's imprisonment in Newgate.

The Callans emigrated to Australia in 1856. Later their daughter Margaret would marry Gavan Duffy's eldest son by his first marriage, John Gavan Duffy. Although she had no desire to return, Callan maintained a keen interest in Ireland. In correspondence with William Carleton she wrote "‘I would not go back if I could, and daily thank God, especially when I happen to read a Nation (or, indeed, any Irish journal), that my children are safe beyond the dangers of starvation or flunkeyism." She died around 1883 in Melbourne.
