= Charles Gavan Duffy =

Irish poet, politician and journalist

The Right Honourable Sir C. Gavan Duffy KCMG, PC
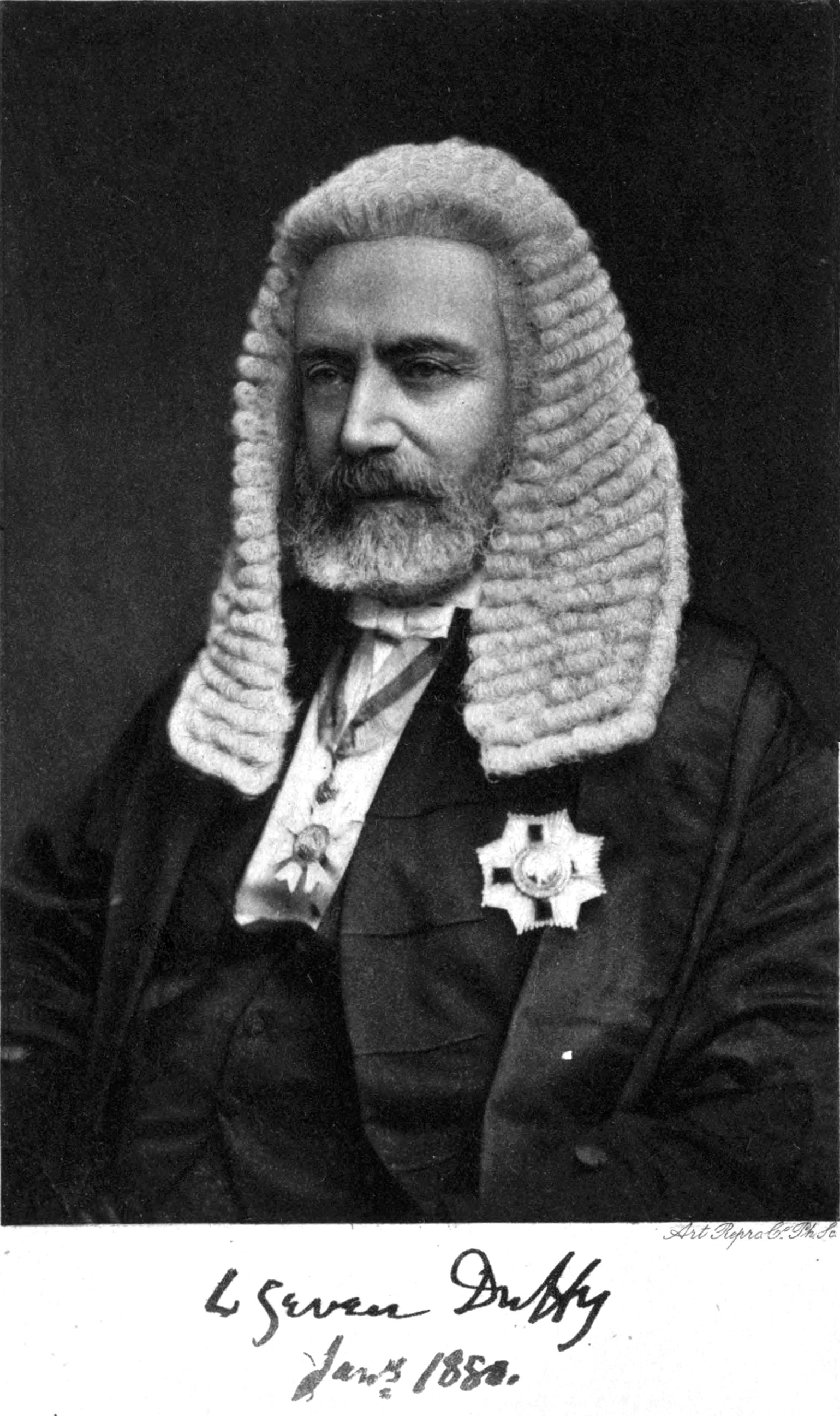
- Duffy in 1880

8th Premier of Victoria
- In office 19 June 1871 – 10 June 1872
- Monarch: Queen Victoria
- Preceded by: Sir James McCulloch
- Succeeded by: James Francis

3rd Speaker of the Victorian Legislative Assembly
- In office 22 May 1877 – 9 February 1880
- Preceded by: Charles McMahon
- Succeeded by: Charles McMahon

Personal details
- Born: Cathal Gabhánach Ó Dubhthaigh (Note: Modern Irish spelling of the name. His headstone represents his name in traditional Gaelic type as "Caṫail Gaḃánaiġ Uí Duḃṫaiġ"; roughly equivalent to Cathail Gabhánaigh Uí Dubhthaigh in Roman type.); 12 April 1816 Monaghan Town, County Monaghan, Ireland
- Died: 9 February 1903 (aged 86) Nice, France
- Spouses: Emily McLaughlin; Susan Hughes; Louise Hall
- Profession: Politician

Sir Charles Gavan Duffy KCMG, PC (born Cathal Gabhánach Ó Dubhthaigh; 12 April 1816 – 9 February 1903) was an Irish poet, politician and journalist (editor of The Nation), Young Irelander and tenant-rights activist. After emigrating to Australia in 1856 he entered the politics of Victoria on a platform of land reform, and in 1871–1872 served as the colony's 8th Premier.

== Ireland ==
=== Early life and career ===
Duffy was born at No.10 Dublin Street in Monaghan Town, County Monaghan, Ireland, the son of a Catholic shopkeeper. His father died when he was ten, and at the insistence of his sister and with the permission of his guardian, a parish priest, he was taken out of the local "poor school" and sent, as its only Catholic pupil, to a classical academy in Monaghan run by a presbyterian minister, John Bleckley. While not allowed "altogether to forget" that he "belonged to the race beaten at the Boyne", he recalls that there was a "boys newspaper" and a "boys' parliament" (indications, perhaps, that Bleckley was influenced by the democratically-inclined pedagogy of Belfast schoolmaster David Manson) in which his Protestant schoolmates debated, and resolved in favour of, Catholic emancipation.

One day, when he was 18, Charles Hamilton Teeling, a United Irish veteran of the 1798 rising, walked into his mother's house. Teeling was establishing a journal in Belfast and asked Duffy to accompany him on a round of calls to promote it in Monaghan. Inspired by Teeling's recollections of '98, Duffy began contributing to the journal, The Northern Herald. In Belfast, where in the 1841-1842 session he studied logic, rhetoric and belles-lettres at the Royal Belfast Academical Institution, Duffy went on to edit The Vindicator, an O'Connellite journal launched by Thomas O'Hagan (later the first Catholic to become Lord Chancellor of Ireland since 1687). In April 1841, in the face of Orange threats and a mob assault on the Vindicator's offices, he and O'Hagan helped organise Daniel O'Connell's visit to Belfast, "capital of the loyal north".

In 1845, after study at the King's Inns in Dublin, Duffy was admitted to the Irish Bar. But he had by then established himself in literary circles as the editor of Ballad Poetry of Ireland (1843), and in political circles as editor of a new Dublin weekly, The Nation.

=== The Nation ===
In 1842, Duffy co-founded The Nation with Thomas Osborne Davis, and John Blake Dillon. Contributors were notable for including nationally minded Protestants: in addition to Davis, Jane Wilde, Margaret Callan, John Mitchel, John Edward Pigot and William Smith O'Brien. All were members or supporters of Daniel O'Connell's Repeal Association, dedicated to a restoration of an Irish parliament through a reversal of the 1800 Acts of Union.

When he had first followed O'Connell, Duffy concedes that he had "burned with the desire to set up again the Celtic race and the catholic church". But in The Nation (which repeatedly invoked memory of the United Irishmen) Duffy committed himself to a "nationality" that would embrace as easily "the stranger who is within our gates" as "the Irishman of a hundred generations." This expansive, ecumenical, view of the opinion-forming tasks of the paper brought him into conflict with the clericalism of the broader movement.

=== At issue with O'Connell ===
O'Connell's paper, The Pilot, did not hesitate to identify religion as the "positive and unmistakable" mark of distinction between Irish and English. As leader of the Catholic Association, O'Connell had fought to secure not only Catholic entry to Parliament but also the prerogatives and independence of the Catholic Church. It was, he maintained, "a national Church" and should the people "rally" to him, they would "have a nation for that Church". O'Connell, at least privately, was of the view that "Protestantism would not survive the Repeal ten years". He assured Dr Paul Cullen (the future Cardinal and Catholic Primate of Ireland) that once an Irish parliament had swept aside Ascendancy privilege, "the great mass of the Protestant community would with little delay melt into the overwhelming majority of the Irish nation".

In 1845, the Dublin Castle administration proposed to educate Catholics and Protestants together in a non-denominational system of higher education. The Nation welcomed the proposition, but O'Connell, claiming that there had been "unanimous and unequivocal condemnation" from the bishops", opposed. Disregarding Thomas Davis's plea that "reasons for separate education are reasons for [a] separate life", and declaring himself content to take a stand "for Old Ireland", O'Connell rejected the "godless" colleges.

For Duffy there was a further, less liberal basis, for his disaffection: O'Connell's repeated denunciations of a "vile union" in the United States "of republicanism and slavery", and his appeal to Irish Americans to join in the abolitionist struggle. Duffy believed the time was not right "for gratuitous interference in American affairs". Not least because of the desire for American support and funding, it was a common view.

=== Young Ireland ===
Charles Gavan Duffy circa 1845

Following Davis's sudden death in 1845, Duffy appointed John Mitchel deputy editor. Against the background of increasingly violent peasant resistance to evictions and of the onset of famine, Mitchell brought a more militant tone. When the Standard in London observed that the new Irish railways could be used to transport troops to quickly curb agrarian unrest, Mitchel responded that the tracks could be turned into pikes and trains ambushed. O'Connell publicly distanced himself from the seditious import of the remarks—it appeared to some setting Duffy, as the publisher, up for prosecution. When the courts failed to convict, O'Connell pressed the issue, seemingly intent on effecting a break with those he referred to disdainfully as "Young Irelanders"—a reference to Giuseppe Mazzini's anti-clerical and insurrectionist Young Italy.

In 1847, the Repeal Association tabled resolutions declaring that under no circumstances was a nation justified in asserting its liberties by force of arms. The Young Irelanders had not advocated physical force, but in response to the "Peace Resolutions" Thomas Meagher argued that if Repeal could not be carried by moral persuasion and peaceful means, a resort to arms would be a no less honourable course. O'Connell's son John forced the decision: the resolution was carried on the threat of the O'Connells themselves quitting the Association.

Duffy and the other Young Ireland dissidents associated with his paper withdrew and formed themselves as the Irish Confederation.

In the desperate circumstances of the Great Famine and in the face of martial-law measures that, following O'Connell's death, a number of Repeal Association MPs had approved in Westminster, Duffy conceded the case for taking "the no less honourable course". With Mitchel he was arrested, leaving it to Meagher, O'Brien and Dillon to raise the standard of revolt. This was a republican tricolour with which Meagher had returned from revolutionary Paris, its colours intended to symbolise reconciliation (white) between Catholic (green) and Protestant (orange). But with the rural priesthood against them and the body of their support confined to the garrisoned towns, their efforts issued in a small demonstration that broke up after its first armed encounter, the Battle of Ballingarry. Their death sentences for treason commuted, the leaders were transported to Van Diemen's Land (Tasmania). Duffy alone escaped. Defended by Isaac Butt he was freed after his fifth trial.

=== League of North and South ===
On his release, Duffy toured famine-stricken Ireland with the renowned Scottish essayist, historian and philosopher Thomas Carlyle. Duffy had invited Carlyle, a Unionist and anti-Catholic, in the vain hope that he might help sway establishment opinion in favour of humane and practical relief. Increasingly he was convinced that agrarian reform was the nation's existential issue and one that could form the basis for a non-sectarian national movement. From his youth Duffy recalled a Quaker neighbour who had been a United Irishman and had laughed at the idea that the issue was kings and governments. What mattered was the land from which the people got their bread. Instead of singing La Marseillaise, he said that what the men of '98 should have borrowed from the French was "their sagacious idea of bundling the landlords out of doors and putting tenants in their shoes".

In 1842, he had already allied himself with James Godkin who had abandoned a bible mission to campaign for the rights of the Catholic tenants he had been tasked with bringing into the Protestant fold. He now looked to James MacKnight (M'Knight) who, closely aided by a group of radical Presbyterian ministers, in 1847 had formed the Ulster Tenant Right Association in Derry.

In 1850, a convention called in Dublin by Duffy and MacKnight formed the Irish Tenant Right League. It was committed in its charter to MacKnight's "three F's": fair rent, free sale, and fixity of tenure.

Uniting activists across the sectarian and constitutional divide, in 1852, the League helped return Duffy (for New Ross) and 49 other tenant-rights MPs to Westminster. In November 1852, Lord Derby's short-lived Conservative government introduced a land bill to compensate Irish tenants on eviction for improvements they had made to the land. The bill passed in the House of Commons in 1853 and 1854, but failed to win consent of the landed grandees in the House of Lords.

What Duffy optimistically hailed as the "League of North and South" unravelled. In the Catholic South, Archbishop Cullen approved the leading Catholic MPs William Keogh and John Sadleir breaking their pledge of independent opposition and accepting positions in a new Whig administration. In the Protestant North William Sharman Crawford and other League candidates had their meetings broken up by Orange "bludgeon men".

=== "Irish Mazzini" ===
To the cause of tenant rights, Cullen was sympathetic, but of Duffy he was deeply suspicious. Following O'Connell, he described Duffy as an "Irish Mazzini"—condemnation from a man who had witnessed the Church's humiliation under Mazzini's Roman Republic in 1849. Duffy in turn accused the Church under Cullen of pursuing a "Roman policy" in Ireland "hostile to its nationality."

Until O'Connell's death, Duffy suggested that Rome had "believed in the possibility of an Independent Catholic State" in Ireland, but that since O'Connell's death could "only see the possibility of a Red Republic". The Curia had, as a result, returned to "her design of treating Ireland as an entrenched camp of Catholicity in the heart of the British Empire, capable of leavening the whole." Ireland for this purpose had to be"thoroughly imperialised, localised, welded into England."

Cullen has been described as the man who "borrowed the British Empire." Under his leadership the Irish church developed an "Hiberno-Roman" mission that was ultimately extended through Britain to the entire English-speaking world. But Cullen's biographers would argue that Duffy travestied Cullen and his church's complex and nuanced relationship to Irish nationalism—perhaps as much as Cullen caricatured Duffy's separatism.

== Australia ==
=== Emigration and new political career ===
The cause of the Irish tenants, and indeed of Ireland generally, seemed to Duffy more hopeless than ever. Broken in health and spirit, he published in 1855 a farewell address to his constituency, declaring that he had resolved to retire from parliament, as it was no longer possible to accomplish the task for which he had solicited their votes. To John Dillon he wrote that an Ireland where McKeogh typified patriotism and Cullen the church was an Ireland in which he could no longer live.

In 1856, Duffy and his family emigrated to Australia. After being feted in Sydney and Melbourne, he settled in the newly formed Colony of Victoria. Duffy was followed to Melbourne by Margaret Callan. Her daughter was later to marry Duffy's eldest son by his first marriage, John Gavan Duffy.

Duffy initially practised law in Melbourne, but a public appeal was soon held to enable him to buy the freehold property necessary to stand for the colonial Parliament. He was immediately elected to the Legislative Assembly for Villiers and Heytesbury in the Western District in 1856. A Melbourne Punch cartoon depicted Duffy entering Parliament as a bog Irishman carrying a shillelagh atop the parliamentary benches (Punch, 4 December 1856, p. 141). He later represented Dalhousie and then North Gippsland.

=== Duffy's Land Act ===
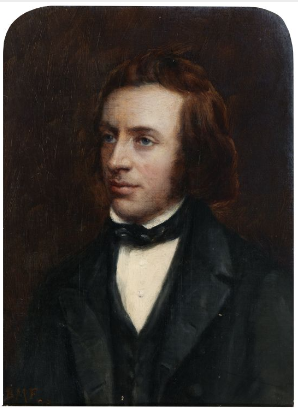
portrait by Beatrice Franklin, 1896

Duffy stood on a platform of land reform. With the collapse of the Victorian Government's Haines Ministry, during 1857, another Irish Catholic, John O'Shanassy, unexpectedly became Premier. Duffy was his deputy as well as Commissioner for Public Works, President of the Board of Land and Works, and Commissioner for Crown Lands and Survey. Irish Catholics serving as Cabinet Ministers was hitherto unknown in the British Empire and Melbourne's Protestant establishment was ill-prepared "to countenance so startling a novelty".

Duffy's Land Act was passed in 1862. Like the Nicholson Act of 1860 which it modified, the Duffy Act provided, in specified areas, for new and extended pastoral leases. It was an effort to break the land-holding monopoly of the so-called "squatter" class. However, the bill had been amended into ineffectiveness by the Legislative Council so that it was easy for the squatters to employ dummies and extend their control. Duffy's attempts to correct the legislation were defeated. Historian Don Garden commented that "Unfortunately Duffy's dreams were on a higher plane than his practical skills as a legislator and the morals of those opposed to him."

In 1858–59, Melbourne Punch cartoons linked Duffy and O'Shanassy with images of the French Revolution to undermine their Ministry. One famous Punch image, "Citizens John and Charles", depicted the pair as French revolutionaries holding the skull and cross bone flag of the so-called Victorian Republic. The O'Shanassy Ministry was defeated at the 1859 election and a new government formed.

=== Premier of Victoria ===
In 1871, Duffy led the opposition to Premier Sir James McCulloch's plan to introduce a land tax, on the grounds that it unfairly penalised small farmers. When McCulloch's government was defeated on this issue, Duffy became Premier and Chief Secretary (June 1871 to June 1872). Victoria's finances were in a poor state and he was forced to introduce a tariff bill to provide government revenue, despite his adherence to British free trade principles.

An Irish Catholic Premier was very unpopular with the Protestant majority in the colony, and Duffy was accused of favouring Catholics in government appointments, an example being the appointment of John Cashel Hoey, who had been his successor as editor of The Nation, to a position in London. In June 1872, his government was defeated in the Assembly on a confidence motion allegedly motivated by sectarianism. He was succeeded as premier by the conservative James Francis and later resigned the leadership of the liberal party in favour of Graham Berry.

=== Speakership and retirement ===
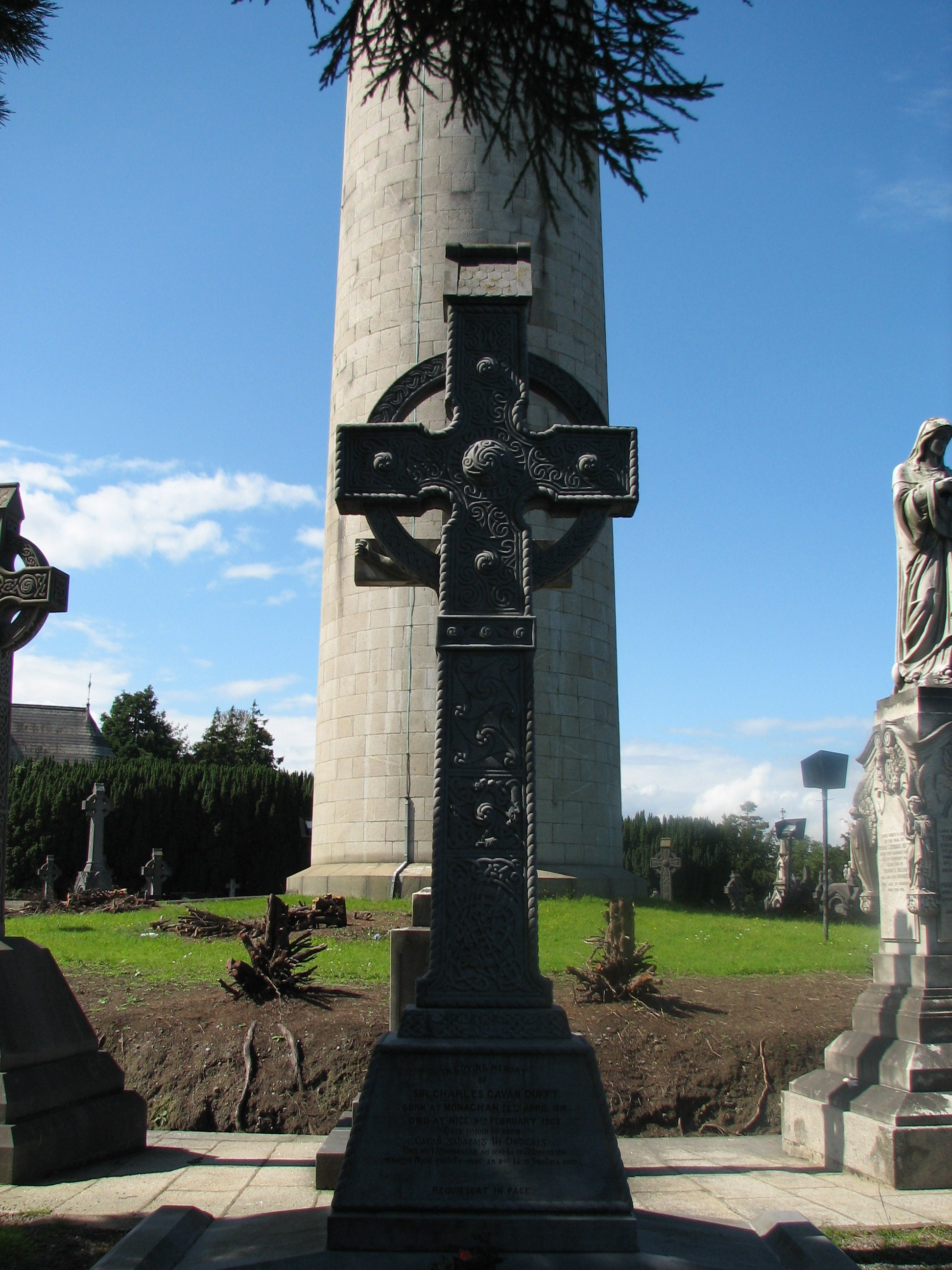
Grave of Charles Gavan Duffy, Glasnevin Cemetery, Dublin

When Berry became Premier in 1877 he made Duffy Speaker of the Legislative Assembly, a post he held without much enthusiasm until handing it over to Peter Lalor, the younger brother of James Fintan Lalor, in 1880. Thereafter he quit politics and retired to southern France where he wrote his memoirs: The League of North and South, 1850–54 (1886) and My Life in Two Hemispheres (1898).

In exile in France, Duffy was an enthusiastic supporter of the Melbourne Celtic Club, which aimed to promote Irish Home Rule and Irish culture. His sons also became members of the club.

In recognition of his services to Victoria, he was knighted in 1873 and made KCMG in 1877. He married for a third time in Paris in 1881, to Louise Hall, and they had four more children.

== Marriages and children ==
In 1842, Duffy married Emily McLaughlin, with whom he had two children, one of whom survived, his son John Gavan Duffy. Emily died in 1845. In 1846 he married his cousin from Newry, Susan Hughes, with whom he had eight children, six of whom survived. After Susan died in 1878, he married for a third time, in Paris in 1881, to Louise Hall, with whom had two further children.

Of his eight surviving children:

- John Gavan Duffy (1844–1917) was a Victorian politician who served variously as Minister for Agriculture, Attorney-General, and Postmaster-General.
- Sir Frank Gavan Duffy (1852–1936), was Chief Justice of the High Court of Australia 1931–35.
- Charles Cashel Gavan Duffy (1855-1932) was clerk of the Australian House of Representatives in 1901–17 and of the Senate in 1917-20.
- Philip Cormac Gavan Duffy (1862–1954), a surveyor and civil engineer noted for his work in Western Australia on the Coolgardie water supply.
- Louise Gavan Duffy (1884–1969) was the joint secretary of the nationalist women's organization, Cumann na mBan, and was an Irish republican present at the 1916 Easter Rising and an Irish language enthusiast who founded an Irish language school, Scoil Bhride (St Bridget)'s Girls School in Earlsfort Terrace, Dublin.
- George Gavan Duffy (1882-1951) was an Irish politician and a signatory to the Anglo-Irish Treaty in 1921. From 1936 onward he was a justice on the Irish High Court, becoming its president from 1946 until his death in 1951. One year before his death, he heard the Tilson Case, in which he applied the Catholic ne temere doctrine to the letter as de Valera's 1937 Irish Constitution gave the Roman Catholic Church in Ireland a "special position".

A grandson, Sir Charles Leonard Gavan Duffy, was a judge on the Supreme Court of Victoria, Australia.

== Death ==
Sir Charles Gavan Duffy died in Nice, France, in 1903, aged 86.

He is buried in Glasnevin Cemetery in Dublin.

== Works ==
Texts on Wikisource:

- My Life in Two Hemispheres, London: T. Fisher Unwin, 1898, Wikidata Q19065902

== Notes ==
Political offices
| Preceded by James McCulloch | Premier of Victoria; 1871–1872 | Succeeded by James Francis |
