= Catholic Defence Association =

The Catholic Defence Association was an organisation founded in 1851 to defend the rights of Irish Roman Catholic tenant farmers. The first meeting held at the Mechanics' Institute, Dublin was chaired by Lord Gormanston, with MPs William Keogh, George Henry Moore and John Sadleir on the platform.

Moore owned 5000 ha (50 km^{2}) in Mayo, and 40 ha in County Roscommon. In 1852 Henry Wilberforce became Secretary, living in Ireland for two or three years. As Secretary he engaged in a correspondence on Church of Ireland proselytizing which was published as Proselytism in Ireland: the Catholic Defence Association versus the Irish Church Missions on the charge of bribery and intimidation; a correspondence between the Rev. Alex Dallas and the Rev. Henry Wilberforce (1852).
