= Ecclesiastical Titles Act 1851 =

Act of the Parliament of the United Kingdom

- Act of Parliament
- Parliament of the United Kingdom
- Long title: An Act to prevent the assumption of certain Ecclesiastical Titles in respect of Places in the United Kingdom
- Citation: 14 & 15 Vict. c. 60
- Territorial extent: United Kingdom

Dates
- Royal assent: 1 August 1851
- Commencement: 1 August 1851 (Note: The Acts of Parliament (Commencement) Act 1793.)
- Repealed: 24 July 1871
Other legislation
Repealed by	Ecclesiastical Titles Act 1871

Status: Repealed

Text of statute as originally enacted

The Ecclesiastical Titles Act 1851 (14 & 15 Vict. c. 60) was an act of the Parliament of the United Kingdom which made it a criminal offence for anyone outside the established "United Church of England and Ireland" to use any episcopal title "of any city, town or place ... in the United Kingdom". It provided that any property passed to a person under such a title would be forfeit to the Crown. The act was introduced by Prime Minister Lord John Russell in response to anti-Catholic reaction to the 1850 establishment of Catholic dioceses in England and Wales under the papal bull Universalis Ecclesiae. The 1851 act proved ineffective and was repealed 20 years later by the Ecclesiastical Titles Act 1871 (34 & 35 Vict. c. 53). Roman Catholic bishops followed the letter of the law but their laity ignored it. The effect was to strengthen the Catholic Church in England, but it also felt persecuted and on the defensive.

== Overview ==
The Reformation in England saw the established Church of England break from communion with Rome but Anglicanism retained an episcopal polity and the same medieval cathedrals and dioceses, such as the Archbishop of Canterbury and Diocese of Lincoln. The Reformation in Scotland proceeded differently, eventually with an established Church of Scotland having a presbyterian polity and a small tolerated Anglican Scottish Episcopal Church. The Reformation in Ireland formally followed the English model, with an established Anglican Church of Ireland; but, unlike in England, most of the laity remained Roman Catholic.

Penal laws initially prevented any Roman Catholic bishops residing in Britain or Ireland; Catholic emancipation from the late 18th century saw increased "toleration" of Catholicism. The Roman Catholic Relief Act 1829 removed most remaining disabilities but prohibited Roman Catholic bishops using the same diocesan names as Anglican ones. Although the Acts of Union 1800 had united the established Churches of Ireland and England, both the 1829 and 1851 restrictions were ignored in Ireland, on the basis that the Roman Catholic dioceses had never lapsed, and papal appointees had continually retained the same pre-Reformation names used by the Anglican dioceses. (Some Protestants referred to Irish Roman Catholic bishops by the location of their cathedral rather than the title of the see, such as "Bishop of Thurles" rather than "Archbishop of Cashel", or "Bishop of Queenstown" rather than "Bishop of Cloyne".) Roman Catholic bishops appointed as apostolic administrators in England were initially given titular sees abroad; later they were given English titles, of places which were not Anglican sees. Thus they did not name the relevant see that of Bristol, but that of Clifton; not Exeter, but Plymouth; not Canterbury, but Southwark. The selection of Westminster as the title of the principal see in London, however, was nevertheless seen by critics as presumptuous for Westminster Abbey had long been identified as a major centre of the Church of England.

In 1850, in response to the Catholic emancipation legislation, Pope Pius IX set up a hierarchy of dioceses in England and Wales in Universalis Ecclesiae. This was met with widespread hostility, and many characterised it as an act of "papal aggression". Incited by anti-Catholic elements and indeed the prime minister himself, serious anti-Catholic riots took place in November 1850 in Liverpool and other cities. Nearly 900,000 Protestants petitioned the Queen to stop what they called "papal aggression". Guy Fawkes day in 1850 saw numerous symbolic denunciations, and a handful of cases of violence. Public opinion and elite opinion also turned heavily against the Oxford Movement (Tractarian movement) inside the Church of England, which led some very prominent figures to become Catholics. Tractarians were denounced as traitors burrowing inside the Anglican church.

The act was passed in response, making it a criminal offence for anyone outside the Church of England to use any episcopal title "of any city, town or place, or of any territory or district (under any designation or description whatsoever), in the United Kingdom" e.g. Bishop of Anytown, and provided that any property passed to a person under such a title would be forfeit to the Crown. The act made an exception for the "Protestant Episcopal Church of Scotland".

It did not succeed in its aim. The Roman Catholic community unofficially used the territorial titles, although the bishops themselves carefully stayed within the letter of the law. No one was ever prosecuted.

== Repeal ==
John Pope Hennessy proposed during the committee stage of the Statute Law Revision Bill 1861 that the Ecclesiastical Titles Act 1851 be added to the bill's list of obsolete acts to be repealed. Home Secretary Sir George Cornewall Lewis responded:

With regard to the Ecclesiastical Titles Act, some maintained that it was in operation, and had been efficacious for its purpose. [Laughter.] That, no doubt, was a matter upon which opinions were not agreed; but the Motion of the hon. Member partook rather of the nature of a practical joke than a serious proposal.

Ecclesiastical Titles Act 1871
- Act of Parliament
- Parliament of the United Kingdom
- Long title: An Act to repeal an Act for preventing the assumption of certain Ecclesiastical Titles in respect of places in the United Kingdom.
- Citation: 34 & 35 Vict. c. 53
- Territorial extent: United Kingdom

Dates
- Royal assent: 24 July 1871
- Commencement: 24 July 1871
Other legislation
Repeals/revokes	Ecclesiastical Titles Act 1851

Status: Current legislation

Text of statute as originally enacted

Text of the Ecclesiastical Titles Act 1871 as in force today (including any amendments) within the United Kingdom, from legislation.gov.uk.

The 1851 act was repealed by the Ecclesiastical Titles Act 1871, which came into force on 24 July 1871, introduced by the first Gladstone ministry. The 1871 act specified in its preamble and in section 1 that the repeal of the 1851 act did not give legal force to the hierarchy of the Roman Catholic Church in England or confer upon it any jurisdiction, these being, in United Kingdom law, matters for the Crown.
