= Free sale, fixity of tenure, and fair rent =

Irish demands for land reform

Free sale, fixity of tenure, and fair rent, also known as the Three Fs, were a set of demands first issued by the Tenant Right League during their campaign for land reform in Ireland starting in the 1850s. They were:

- Free sale—meaning a tenant could sell the interest in their holding to an incoming tenant without landlord interference;
- Fixity of tenure—meaning that a tenant could not be evicted if the rent was paid;
- Fair rent—meaning rent control: for the first time in the United Kingdom, fair rent would be decided by land courts, not by the landlords.

Many historians contend that their absence contributed significantly to the Great Famine (1846–49), as it enabled the mass eviction of starving tenants. The Three Fs were advocated by several political movements, notably the Independent Irish Party (1852–1858) and later the Irish Parliamentary Party during the Land War (from 1878). The British Government conceded to these demands through a series of Irish Land Acts enacted from the 1870s onward, with nearly full implementation in the Land Law (Ireland) Act 1881.
