= Tenant-right =

Concept in common law

Tenant-right is a term in the common law system expressing the right to compensation which a tenant has, either by custom or by law, against his landlord for increment at the termination of his tenancy.

In England, it was governed for most part by the Agricultural Holdings Acts and the Allotments and Small Holdings Acts. The preceding were reformed by the Agricultural Tenancies Act 1995. In Ireland, tenant-right was a custom, prevailing particularly in Ulster, known as the Custom of Ulster, by which the tenant acquired a right not to have his rent raised arbitrarily at the expiration of his term. This resulted in Ulster in considerable fixity of tenure and, in case of a desire on the part of the tenant to sell his farm, made the tenant-right of considerable capital value, amounting often to many years rent.

The Evesham Custom is one example of a tenant-right custom still in 21st century operation, having been given a specific exemption from the Agricultural Tenancies Act 1995.
