= History of Belfast =

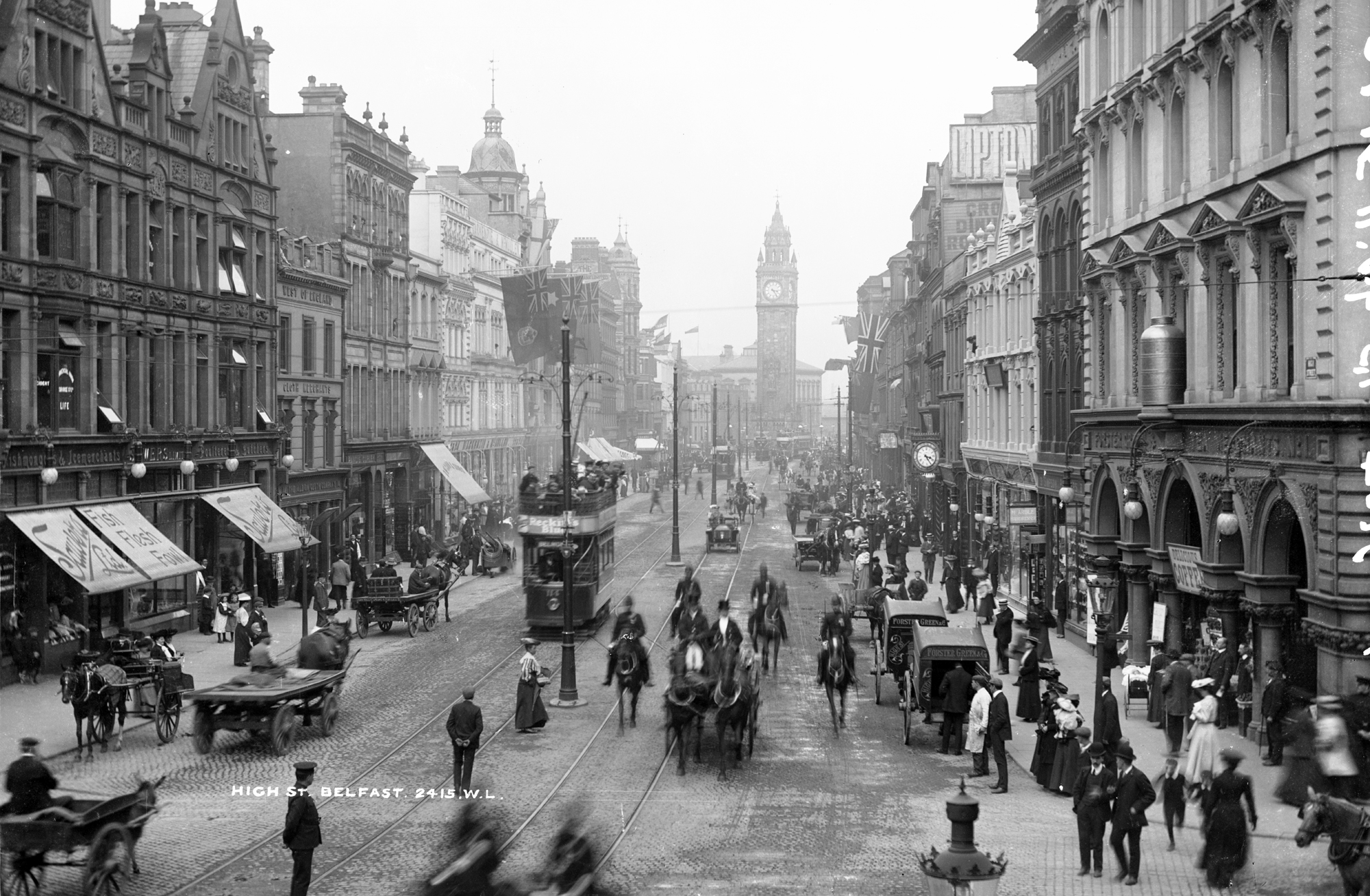
High Street, Belfast, c.1906

Belfast is the capital of Northern Ireland, and throughout its modern history has been a major commercial and industrial centre. In the late 20th century manufacturing industries that had existed for several centuries declined, particularly shipbuilding. The city's history has occasionally seen conflict between different political factions who favour different political arrangements between Ireland and Great Britain. Since the Good Friday Agreement, the city has been relatively peaceful and major redevelopment has occurred, especially in the inner city and dock areas.

== Prehistory ==
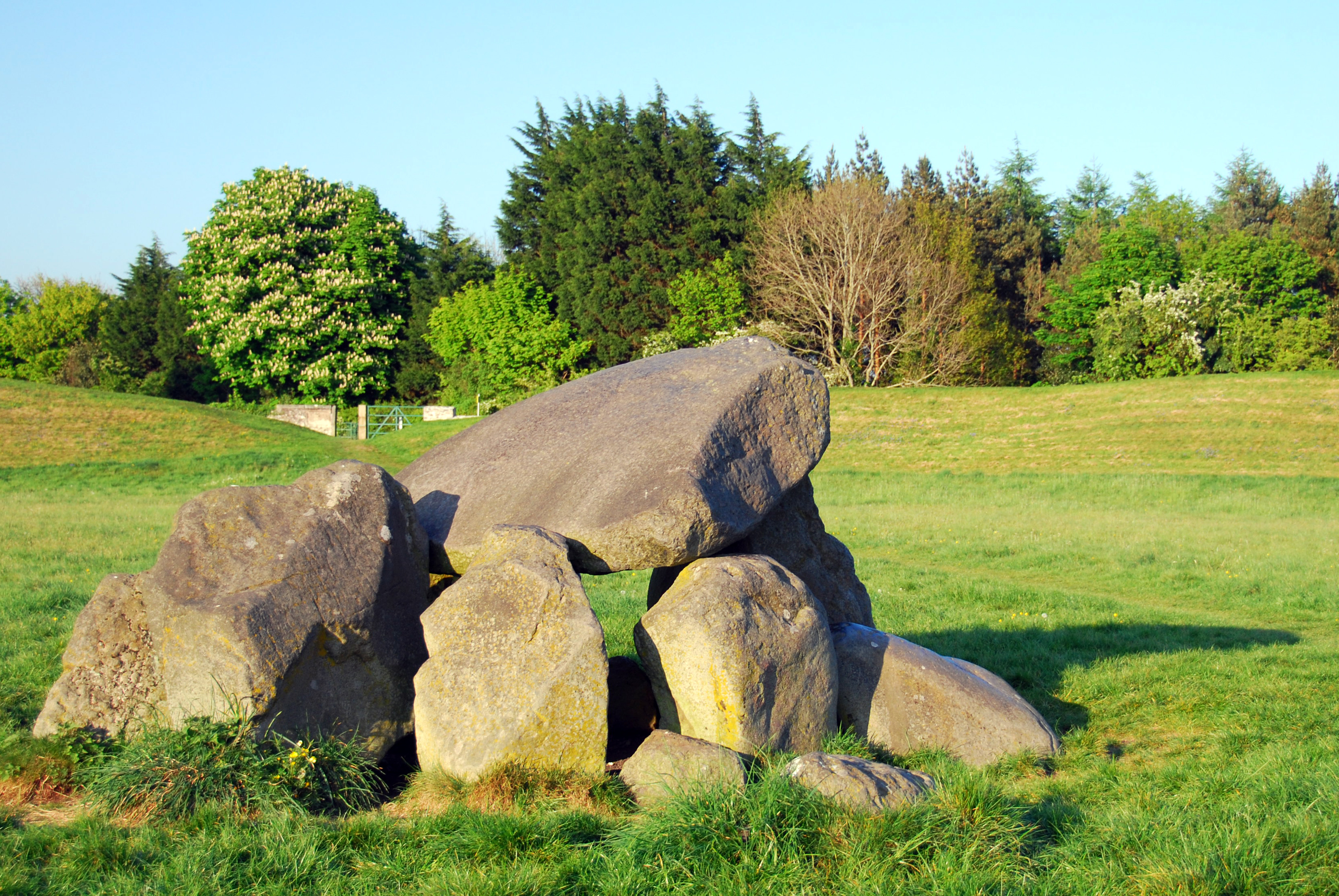
The megalithic tomb at the centre of the Giant's Ring

The first permanent settlements were built in the Iron Age. The Giant's Ring, a 5,000-year-old henge, is located near the city, and evidence of Bronze and Iron Age occupation has been found in the surrounding hills. For example, McArt's Fort, an Iron Age hill fort, sits atop Cavehill north of the city.

== Middle Ages ==
The name Belfast comes from the Irish Béal Feirste (Irish pronunciation: [bʲeːlˠ ˈfʲɛɾˠ(ə)ʃtʲə]), "mouth of the Farset", a river whose name comes from Irish fearsaid, meaning a sandbar or tidal ford. This was formed where the Farset flowed into the River Lagan, along what is now High Street, until culverted in the late 18th century. It was at this crossing that the early settlement developed.

Béal Feirste sat on the border of two Gaelic territories in the province of Ulster: Dál Fiatach to the south, and Dál nAraide to the north. The Irish annals record a battle being fought at the ford in the 7th century, between the Ulaid of Dál Fiatach and the Cruthin of Dál Araide. Saint George's church is built on the site of an early medieval chapel used by pilgrims crossing the ford. The earliest mention of this Chapel of the Ford is in the papal taxation rolls of 1306.

In 1177, during the Anglo-Norman invasion of Ireland, John de Courcy conquered land in eastern Ulster that included Belfast, soon founding the Earldom of Ulster. The Anglo-Normans are believed to have built a fort at Belfast to guard the river crossing, as well as nearby Carrickfergus Castle. This fort at Belfast was probably a wooden and earthen ringwork or motte-and-bailey, and the earliest surviving reference to it is in 1262. It was most likely built on the orders of de Courcy or his successor Hugh de Lacy. In 1263, the Earldom of Ulster passed to the House of Burgh.

The original Belfast Castle stood roughly where modern-day Castle Place and High Street meet in Belfast city centre. The castle was attacked, recovered, destroyed and rebuilt several times over the following centuries.

As part of his campaign to establish himself as king of Scotland, Robert Bruce plotted with his brother Edward Bruce to invade Ulster in an attempt to divert English military resources there. During this Bruce campaign in Ireland, Edward Bruce landed at Carrickfergus with an army in 1315 and seized the town. Many of Ulster's Gaelic lords and chieftains welcomed the invasion, seeing it as a way to drive the English out of Ireland. Some paid homage to Edward, pledging their fealty to him and giving him the hollow title of King of Ireland. Edward laid siege to Belfast Castle that year and later destroyed it. Edward's bid to become King of Ireland slowly unravelled as a famine weakened his army. His campaign ultimately ended when he was killed in the Battle of Faughart in 1318. Following the murder of William Donn de Burgh, 3rd Earl of Ulster in 1333, there erupted a civil war among the de Burghs.

"Bruce's invasion and the death of William de Burgh led to the loss of English power for three centuries in this part of Ulster". By the mid 14th century, the ruined Belfast castle and its manor were taken over by the O'Neills, a powerful Gaelic Irish dynasty. It became part of the territory of Northern (or Lower) Clannaboy (Clann Aodha Buidhe). It then remained under Gaelic control for more than two centuries. The Irish annals indicate that Belfast castle was periodically slighted and rebuilt during this period.

The castle was briefly taken five times during these two centuries of Gaelic control before the Tudor conquest, all of them during a 36-year period. In 1476, Belfast Castle was taken and demolished by Éinri mac Eoghain O'Neill, king of Tír Eoghain; in 1489 by Hugh Roe O'Donnell, king of Tír Chonaill; in 1503 and again in 1512 by Gerald, 8th Earl of Kildare, the Lord Deputy of Ireland. In 1523, his son and successor Gerald Óg wrote to Henry VIII that he had seized Belfast Castle. Archaeological excavations at Castle Place have found medieval pottery and timbers dated to the 16th century. This provided some of the first physical evidence for dating the medieval occupation of the town.

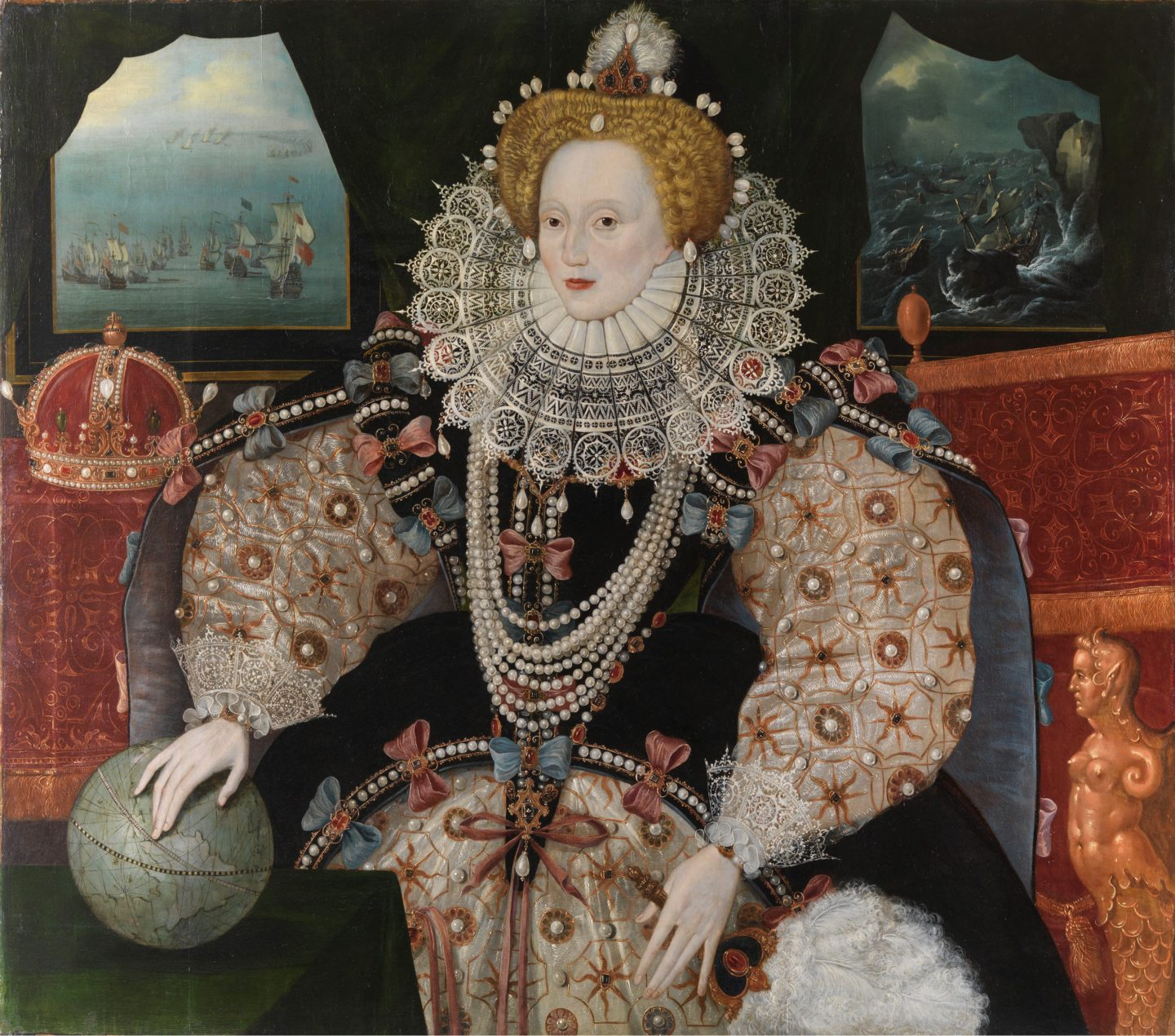
Elizabeth I

During the Tudor conquest of Ireland, which began in the 1530s, Belfast Castle "became of increasing interest to the English authorities in Ireland". The castle was fortified in 1552 by the English Lord Deputy of Ireland, Sir James Croft, during the reign of Edward VI. Croft put this castle under the command of Hugh Mac Neil Óg, who was loyal to the English Crown. Mac Neil Óg was killed by Scottish raiders in 1555, and Belfast Castle was given to Randolphus Lane.

Documents from 1568 relate to negotiations between Brian McPhelim O'Neill and the English Lord Deputy for building a bridge over the ford, following the surrender and regrant of the "castle and manor of Belfast". It seems that by 1571, McPhelim O'Neill jointly held Belfast Castle with the English. He wrote to Elizabeth I from Belfast in July 1571, suggesting that the Crown maintain a small garrison in Belfast together with his own forces. By the following year, however, O'Neill had learnt that the queen had approved a plantation (colonization) of his territory, including Belfast.

In 1571, during this Enterprise of Ulster, the Clannaboy O'Neill land was granted to Sir Thomas Smith by Elizabeth I. Smith would fail fulfill the requirements of his grant by not subduing the area and the land later reverted to the Crown under James I.

The Earl of Essex pledged to Elizabeth that he would conquer parts of Ulster at his own expense. In 1573, he set out on his expedition from Liverpool, only to have his convoy get caught in a storm off the coast of Ireland and disperse. Lord Essex was forced to spend the winter in Belfast. In October 1574, Essex lured Sir Brian McPhelim and his entourage (including his wife) under the pretense of negotiations and a feast in McPhelim's honour at Belfast Castle. Essex then had MacPhelim's retainers killed and took MacPhelim, his wife and his brother into custody, sending them to Dublin where they were later executed. In 1597, during the Nine Years' War, the English garrison posted at Belfast Castle was captured and killed by Ulster rebels. The castle, village and surrounding Lagan Valley were all devastated during the rebellion.

== Plantation of Ulster ==
In 1603, after the rebellion, Gaelic chieftain Conn O'Neill (son of Hugh O'Neill, Earl of Tyrone) was holding a Christmas feast at his stronghold of Castlereagh. After three days of revelry, he and his guests ran out of wine and he ordered his men into the village of Belfast to steal more drink. O'Neill's men got into a quarrel then skirmished with English soldiers en route, killing one of them. O'Neill was subsequently arrested for "making war against the Queen's soldiers" and thrown into a dungeon at Carrickfergus Castle. O'Neill was then sentenced to death for the wine incident. A secret agreement between O'Neill, Richard Hamilton and Hugh Montgomery, a Scottish lord, saw O'Neill escape from imprisonment. Hamilton seduced the daughter of O'Neill's jailer and Montgomery had Lady O'Neill smuggle in rope inside a large cheese wheel. O'Neill then used the rope to escape down the sea cliff side of the castle, where a boat was waiting. Impressed by his daring, the newly crowned James I offered O'Neill a pardon on condition he honour his terms with the Scottish lords who helped him escape and divide his lands in Ulster between himself, Montgomery and Hamilton. O'Neill kept the land Belfast was on. Montgomery, in turn, encouraged the migration of common people from Scotland to Ulster. When James I became aware of this popular movement, he officially involved the monarchy. James decided to make the already occurring human migration royal policy and escalated its pace and scale.

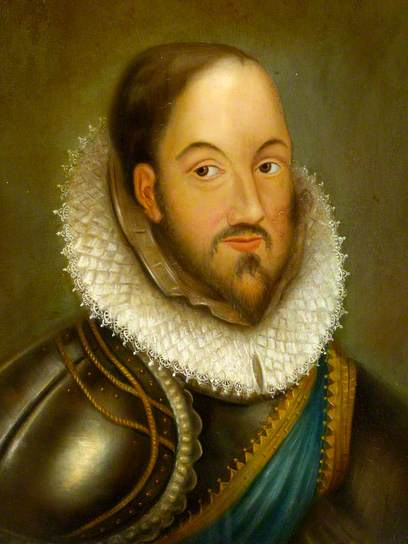
The 1st Baron Chichester, Lord Deputy of Ireland from 1605 until 1616.

In 1605, Sir Arthur Chichester was appointed Lord Deputy of Ireland by James I. He was already serving as Governor of Carrickfergus in 1598 after his brother, Sir John Chichester, was killed in the Battle of Carrickfergus. Chichester was later granted lands that included Carrickfergus, Belfast and the Lagan Valley. Belfast was still a small village (with one inn) that had been affected by the Nine Years' War. At that time, Belfast consisted mostly of Scots, English and Manx who lived in timber houses. Chichester was determined to transform the village into a proper town and set about finding ways to develop the area. He brought masons and smiths over from Britain and ordered the firing of over a million bricks for new construction.

After the Flight of the Earls left Ulster without leadership in 1607, James saw an opportunity to finally Anglicise the last Gaelic province in Ireland. Ulster, up to this point, had accepted royal patrimony and trade but hitherto resisted British cultural influence. James granted Irish lands and titles to those who were loyal to him in Britain as well as to the loyal Gaelic lords he deemed "worthy" in Ireland. James encouraged the increase of migration from Britain to Ireland, promising his subjects work and a new life in what was later dubbed the Plantation of Ulster. Though many came from all over Britain, the largest response was from lowland Scotland. Scottish migrants came to Ulster in droves, honoring the king's conditions to develop existing towns, build roads and found new settlements. This mass migration during the Plantation saw the eventual emergence of the Ulster-Scots.

In 1611, Chichester replaced the old castle with one made of stone and timber, built on the same spot as the previous fortifications. This was the final version of Belfast Castle on the original site; the building was destroyed by fire on 25 April 1708. Instead of building yet another structure at this location, a new stone mansion was constructed on Cave Hill in north Belfast in 1870 and dubbed Belfast Castle. This modern, off-site version of the castle still stands today and is a popular tourist attraction. Belfast Castle is situated by the entrance to the Cave Hill hiking trails and is often used as a venue for weddings and other formal occasions. In recognition of his efforts, James I formally granted the town of Belfast and its castle, together with some large estates, to Chichester creating Baron Chichester by letters patent.

The new importance of Belfast was demonstrated in 1613 when the town was constituted a corporation of a sovereign, with twelve burgesses and a commonalty, which included the privilege of sending two representatives to Parliament. The first sovereign appointed in Belfast was Thomas Vesey, and the first representatives sent to parliament were Sir John Blennerhasset, Baron of the Exchequer, and George Trevillian. Despite Belfast's seemingly growing significance to the British monarchy, it was still very much a small settlement at this stage. John Speed's 1610 map of Ireland marks Belfast as an insignificant village, and the 1612 patent styles it as a town, or village. Nearby Carrickfergus, successfully held by the English for much longer, was still the more prominent settlement and centre for trade. In 1640 (Note: Some sources state 1637, not 1640.) Thomas Wentworth, the Lord Deputy of Ireland, purchased the Carrickfergus trade monopolies (namely, paying one third of the import duty paid by other locations in the kingdom) and endowed them to Belfast. The customs house was also moved to Belfast around this time. With the relocation of the Customs House, trade was effectively redirected to Belfast at the expense of Carrickfergus.

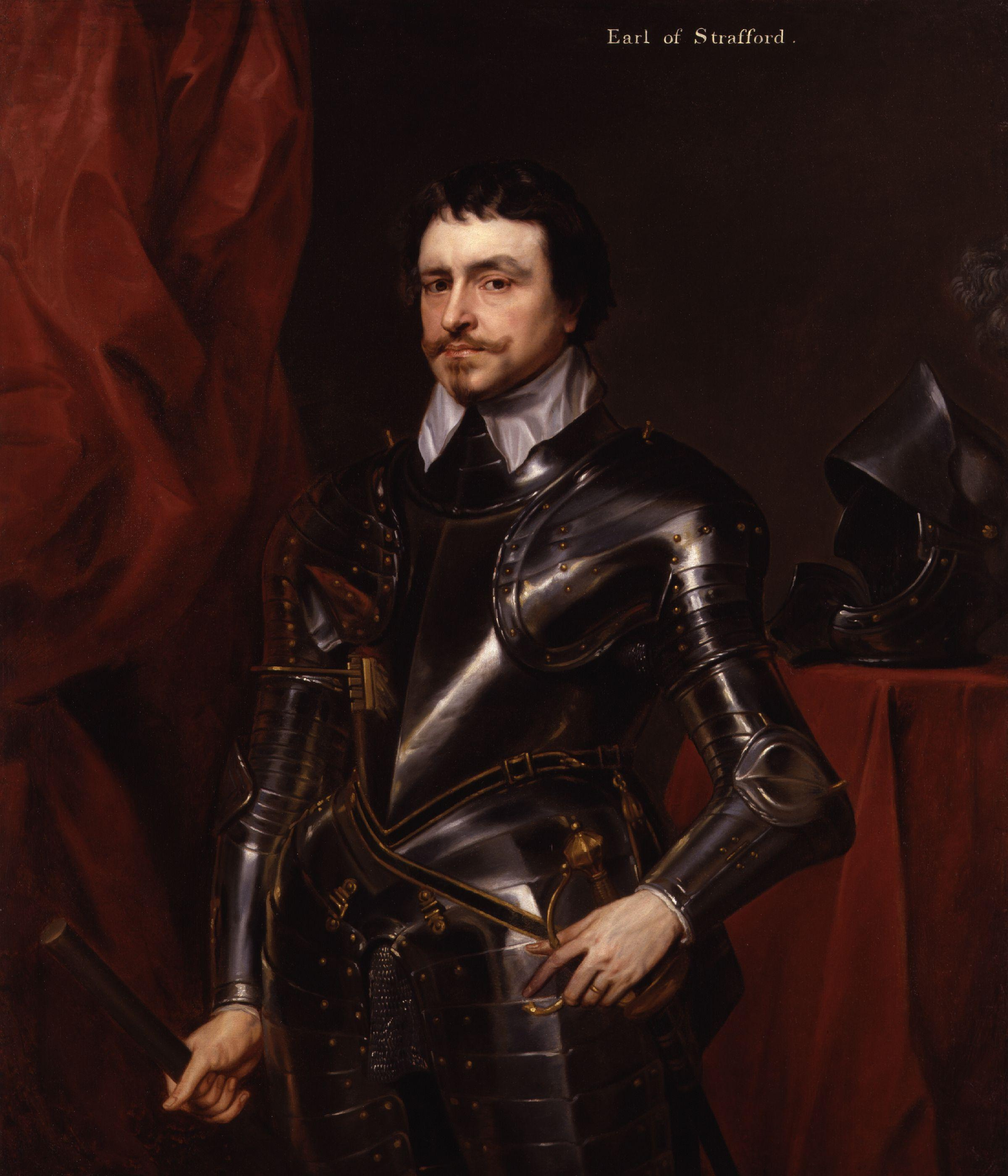
The 1st Earl of Strafford (1593–1641), as he became in January 1640. He was previously known as The 1st Viscount Wentworth. He served as Lord Deputy of Ireland from 1632 until 1640.

Many of the new arrivals to Ulster were Scottish Presbyterian Protestants and, therefore, not members of the Church of England. Since they did not yet have churches buildings of their own, many Scottish Presbyterians attended the more permissive Church of Ireland. Being more Puritan in theology, many Ulster-Scots preferred to keep their worship style simple and plain. Pursuing conformity, The 1st Viscount Wentworth (Lord Deputy of Ireland between 1632 and 1640) decided to put northern Protestants more in line with the Church of England and its more elaborate form of worship which included chanting and liturgy. On 10 August 1636, Henry Lesley, Bishop of Down, summoned Church of Ireland ministers to a meeting in Belfast and rebuked those who had allowed themselves to be influenced by Presbyterianism. The clergy present argued back that they found the Book of Common Prayer and other practices too close to Roman Catholicism and "pope-ish" in nature. Many ministers who refused to implement the Bishop's measures would later attempt to find religious freedom in the American Colonies, though some were turned back to Scotland by a storm near Newfoundland.

A new form of sectarian tension began to develop in the early half of the 17th century. Recent brutalities committed by both Irish Rebels and English forces (including Chichester) during the Nine Years War lingered in the memories of the common people on both sides. Prejudice and disdain grew between a significant amount of the native Gaelic-Irish population and the new arrivals from Scotland. Scottish Presbyterianism at the time carried strong anti-Catholic sentiments common to Puritanism. For their part, many Gaelic Catholics were anti-Protestant to such a degree that Ireland was used as a staging point for the Counter-Reformation. The discord was exacerbated when both British and Gaelic leaders who publicized depictions of atrocities, both real and exaggerated, perpetrated by the other side. Older stereotypes such as the Irish being "barbarians" and the English (now British) being "brutal invaders" caused further division in Ulster. Figures like Chichester, as well as his Gaelic counterparts, purposely stirred up tensions between their respective peoples in order to garner more power and influence for themselves. As result, relations gradually worsened between common Ulster-Scots people and their Gaelic-Irish neighbours.

== Wars of the Three Kingdoms ==
Taking advantage of the civil wars that engulfed England and Scotland, in 1641 the Catholic Gaels of Ulster rose in revolt, contributing to what became known as the Wars of the Three Kingdoms. Belfast was saved when the insurgents were driven back from Lisburn.

For their further protection, the town's Presbyterians looked, not to the new parliamentarian regime in England, but rather to Scotland whose parliament still acknowledged the House of Stuart. In 1644, the town was occupied Scottish army under Robert Monro that in battling the rebels laid waste to much of Antrim and Down. In 1649, the Belfast Presbytery was sufficiently emboldened to rebuke the government in London for violating its Solemn League and Covenant with the Scots and for executing the king. It drew upon Belfast, whose "obscurity" til then had never came to his "hearing", the vitriol of John Milton. Outraged that these "false prophets" and "unhallowed priestlings" should defy "the sovereign majesty of England", Milton denounced the Scottish residents of the town as "ungrateful and treacherous guests".

On 30 September 1649, after four days resistance, Belfast fell to an English army under Oliver Cromwell's lieutenant, Robert Venables. He briefly considered sending the town's Scottish and Presbyterian residents into permanent exile. On 6 December, Venables routed what remained of the Presbyterian militia (the Laggan Army) and Scots Covenanters under Hugh Montgomery at Lisnagarvey (or Lisnetrain) outside Lisburn. Many of the Scottish soldiers later settled in Belfast, which enjoyed relative peace and prosperity following the Stuart Restoration. By 1667, Belfast was producing half of Ireland's supply of butter, which was heavily used by the Irish people. Butter also sold at a premium in Europe, with the Dutch paying the highest prices and the French ordering the largest quantities.

== Williamite War ==
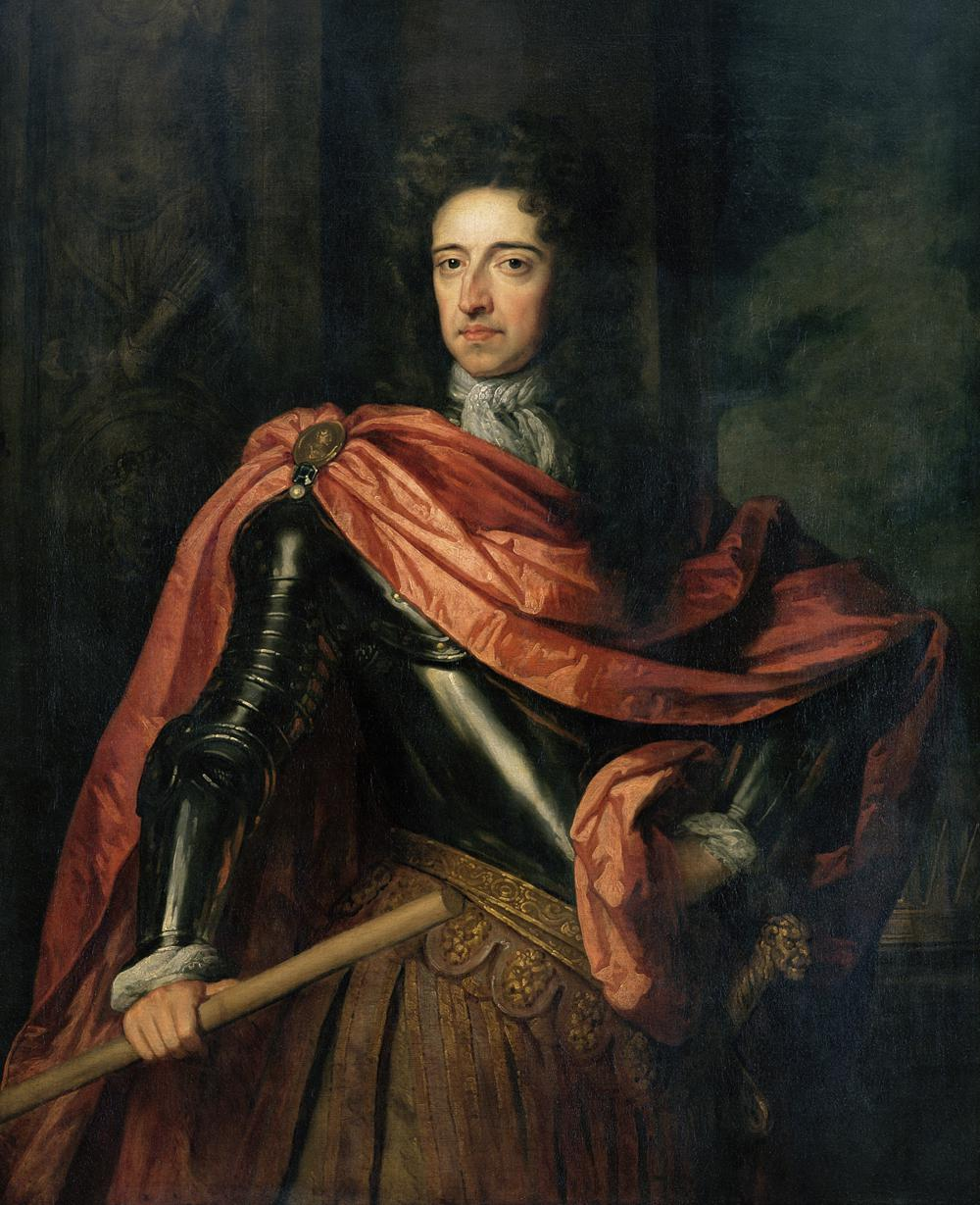
William III (of Orange)

In April 1689, the Protestant William III (the Prince of Orange) and Mary II were crowned as joint monarchs, succeeding the Catholic James II in an event known in England as the Glorious Revolution. During the ensuing Williamite War in Ireland, Belfast changed hands twice between the Jacobite forces of James II and Williamite forces of William III. After being seized by Protestants during an uprising against the rule of the James II in 1689, it was captured without a fight following the Break of Dromore by Richard Hamilton and the mainly Catholic Irish Army. Later the same year, a large Williamite expeditionary force arrived in Belfast Lough landing and laying siege to Carrickfergus. Belfast was captured by a detachment led by Henry Wharton after the Jacobites abandoned it without a fight. Frederick Schomberg's forces landed and marched south eventually setting up Dundalk Camp. Combined with the earlier Jacobite failure at the Siege of Derry, James' forces were compelled to withdraw from most of Ulster. Belfast remained in Williamite hands through the end of the war. When Schomberg set up his military camp in Dundalk, his army found themselves pitching their tents next to a bog. The acrid air of the swamp led to many of his soldiers contracting diseases like dysentery and illness ravaged the camp. Many troops were sent back to the "great hospital" in Belfast for treatment and a substantial number died in transit. Contemporary accounts described ships full of nothing but dead men and that some soldiers' limbs were so rotten that they fell off while being bandaged. The Dundalk Camp debacle resulted in 3,762 recorded deaths.

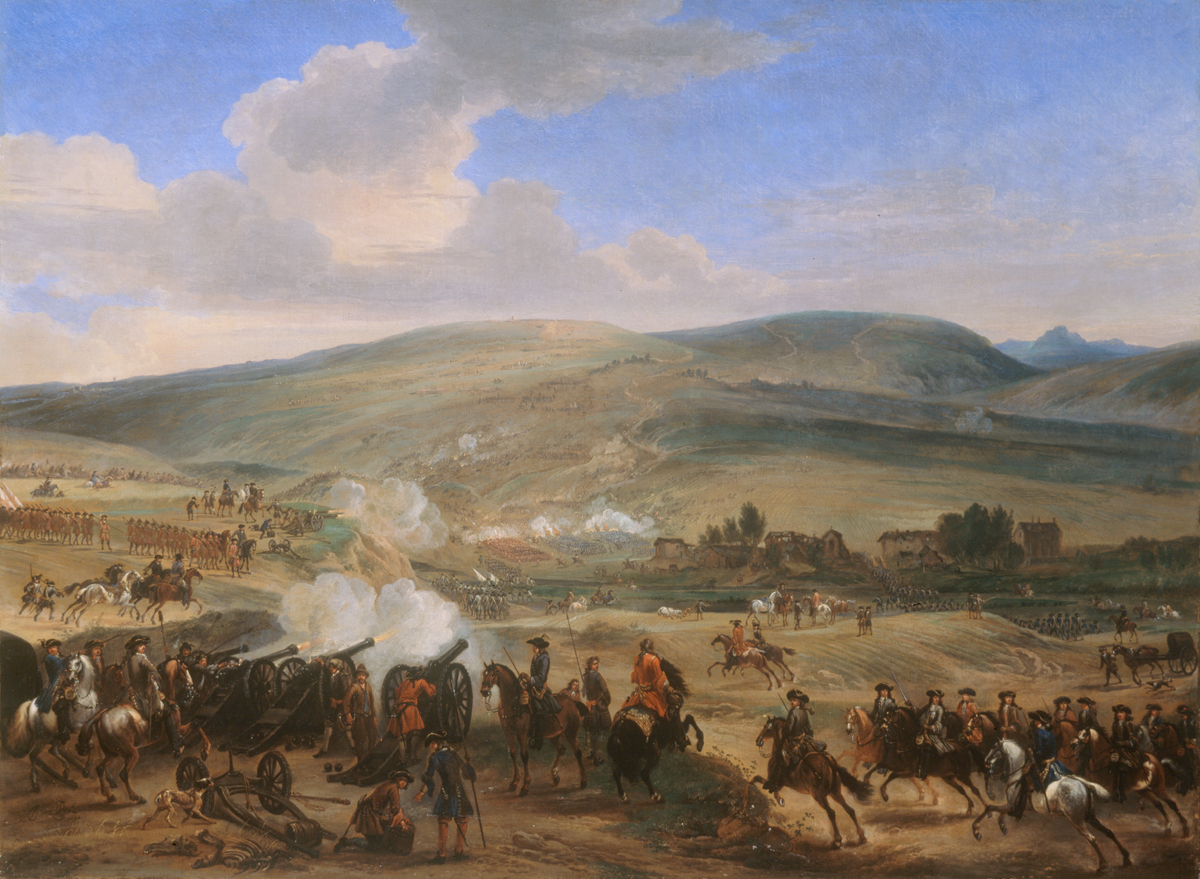
Battle of the Boyne. 12 July 1690.

William of Orange landed in Carrickfergus on 14 June 1690 with a large force of Dutch, German, Danish and French Huguenot soldiers and was reinforced by English raw recruits and Ulster skirmishers. The Ulster Protestants who joined William's army were so ill-equipped that one general remarked that they were "half-naked" with pistols hanging from their belts. Within hours of landing, William arrived unexpectedly in Belfast to a stunned crowd of onlookers. Accounts tell that, at first, many people stared in awed silence at William and his glamorous entourage to where many in his party were unnerved. It was not until someone in the gathering had the mind to cheer that applause quickly reverberated through the crowd, to the relief of William's group. William was met by a representative of the Belfast Corporation who implored him to "pull the stiff neck of every papist down." William responded in broken English that he "came to see the people of Ireland settled in a lasting peace."

William III defeated James II at the Battle of the Boyne on 12 July 1690, after which James II fled into exile to France. Final victory came when Williamite forces defeated the Jacobite army at the Battle of Aughrim in 1691. The 1691 Treaty of Limerick ended the Williamite War in Ireland. William III's reign marks the cementing of Protestantism in the British monarchy, the establishing of Parliament as the preeminent governing body and the beginning of the Protestant Ascendency in Ireland.

== Protestant ascendency, militias, merchants, and industrialisation ==
The 18th century saw the rise of the Protestant Ascendancy in Ireland. Protestant elites and commoners received privileged status over most Catholics which they justified as a reward for siding with William III during the Glorious Revolution. Penal Laws disqualified many Catholics from the legal amenities enjoyed by other British subjects (including Irish Protestants). Presbyterian Ulster-Scots were also affected to a lesser degree as dissenters (non-Anglican Protestants). The Irish Parliament in Dublin was dominated by Protestant nobility and landowners. Absentee landlords, rent hikes, land confiscation from Catholics and Protestant dissenters became common during this period.

Belfast thrived as a merchant town, importing goods from Great Britain and exporting linen products in increasing volume. Linen at the time was made by small producers in rural areas. Belfast also suffered from the great frost, followed by drought, that hit Ireland in 1740. That winter, Belfast was reported to have been covered in snow by a powerful blizzard. On 23 December 1771, aggrieved by high rents and evictions, the exclusively Protestant Hearts of Steel gang gathered in a meeting house in Templepatrick. The group, mostly farmers, armed themselves with pitchforks, firelock rifles and pistols and made for nearby Belfast. Twelve hundred men entered through Belfast's north gate and surrounded the barracks where a farmer was being held for not paying his rent. Dr. Alexander Haberday, who was in the crowd, made his way to the barracks in an effort to peacefully negotiate the release of the prisoner. Suddenly, the gates flew open and a detachment of soldiers fired into the crowd, killing five people including Haberday, and wounding nine others. These deaths resulted in violence across Belfast which moved to the house of Waddell Cunningham and Hercules Lane (now Royal Ave). The Sovereign (mayor) of Belfast believed the whole town was burning and released the prisoner, fearing further destruction. The revolt spilled over into mid-Ulster with the Hearts of Oak combining forces with the Hearts of Steel. Eventually, the Irish Parliament passed a special act and sent troops into Ulster to put down the unrest.

On 13 April 1778, during the American Revolution, a privateer ship called "The Ranger", captained by John Paul Jones, appeared in Belfast Lough. The American ship engaged and captured the Royal Navy vessel stationed there, HMS Drake. The Sovereign of Belfast, Stuart Banks, sent word to Dublin Castle asking for military assistance. When no help materialised, the Irish began to form their own militias, independent of the government, to defend their land. Many Ulster-Scots had relatives in the American colonies, which made them sympathetic to their cause; John Hancock had ancestors from County Down and Charles Thomson, who designed the Great Seal of the United States, was from Maghera. But they nonetheless formed militias to defend Ireland from possible invasion. The Volunteer Corps, formed in Belfast in 1778, was self-financed and free from the military chain of command. Originally created to repel invasion, when no action took place, the Volunteer Corps turned its attention to the Irish Parliament, pressuring it to reform.

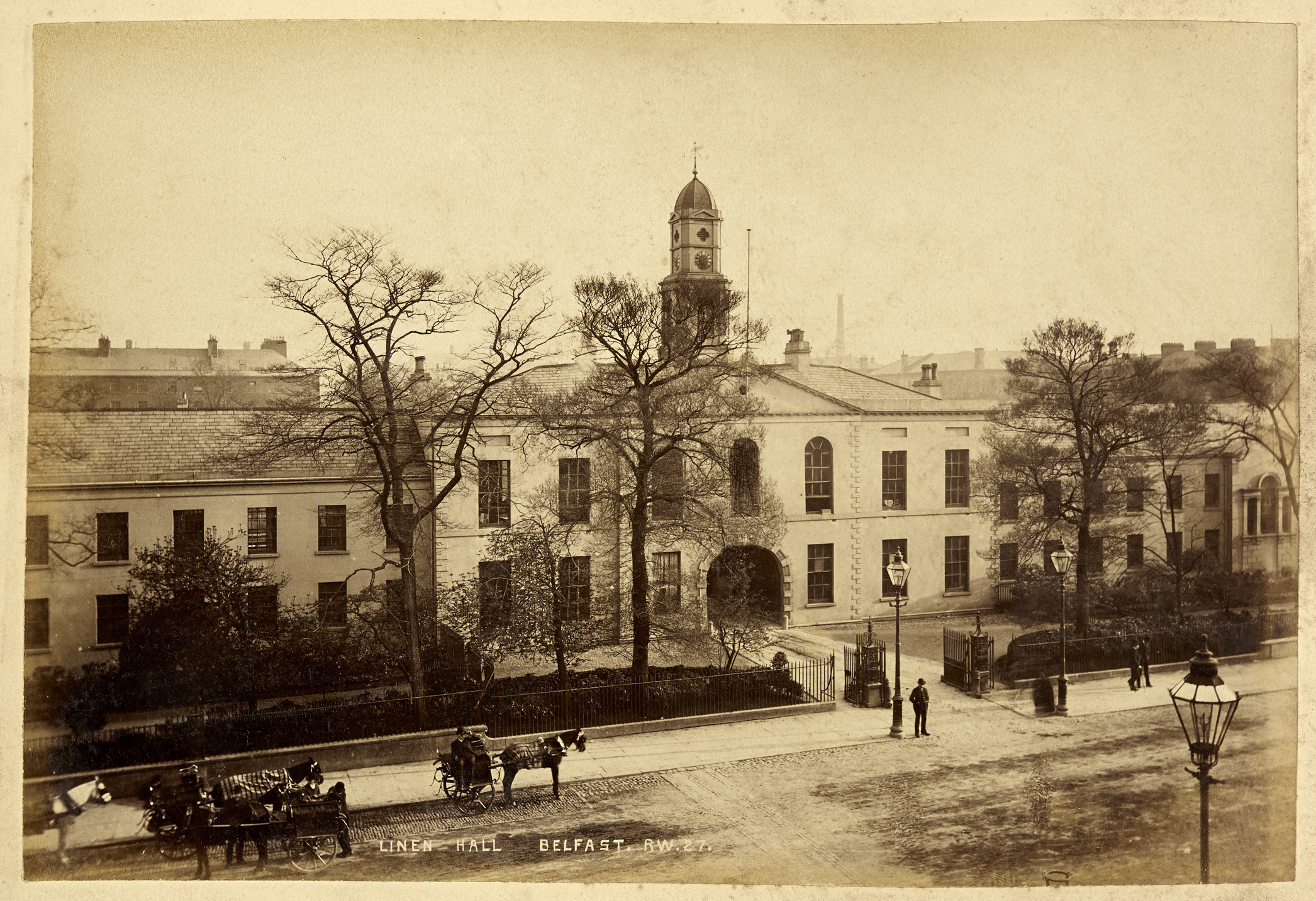
The Linen Hall, Belfast

In 1780, Belfast became a centre of debate and radical politics, partly because its predominantly Presbyterian population was discriminated against under the penal laws, and also because of the influence of the Scottish Enlightenment. One aim of the new political movement in Ireland included an end to all religious discrimination and the enfranchisement of Catholics on an equal level with Protestants. In 1783, Belfast sent delegates to the Irish Parliament in Dublin, who attempted to give Catholics voting rights but failed. In 1784, at a convention for the Volunteer Corps, Belfast members defied all the other Irish brigades and declared that they would allow Catholics to join their ranks. Two major developments at the time altered the appearance of Belfast's centre: in 1784 plans were drawn up for the White Linen Hall (now the site of Belfast City Hall) along with new modern streets (now Donegall Square and Donegall Place). Construction was completed by 1788. In the second half of the 18th century, the city underwent much change. It had started to overtake Carrickfergus as the main settlement in the area, so much so that, at some point, Carrickfergus Lough was renamed Belfast Lough. Industries were set up and concentrated in Belfast, which resulted in a high level of internal migration to the town, although Belfast had seen some growth before that. Of the migrants, a fair proportion were Roman Catholics from the west of Ulster, settling mostly in the west of Belfast. Until that point Belfast had been overwhelmingly Protestant.

Towards the end of the 18th century, money was raised by collections from both the Presbyterian and Church of Ireland congregations of the town and, together with monies donated by Protestant businessmen, enough was raised to erect the first Roman Catholic church in Belfast – St. Mary's in Chapel Lane: at the first mass on 30 May 1784, the mostly Presbyterian 1st Belfast Volunteer Company paraded to the chapel yard and gave the parish priest a guard of honour, with many of the Protestants of Belfast also present and sharing the event. At the time, the Roman Catholic population of Belfast was only around four hundred. It would rise to some 45,000 by 1886. In 1786 the River Farset was covered over to create High Street, and the ford across the Lagan was removed.

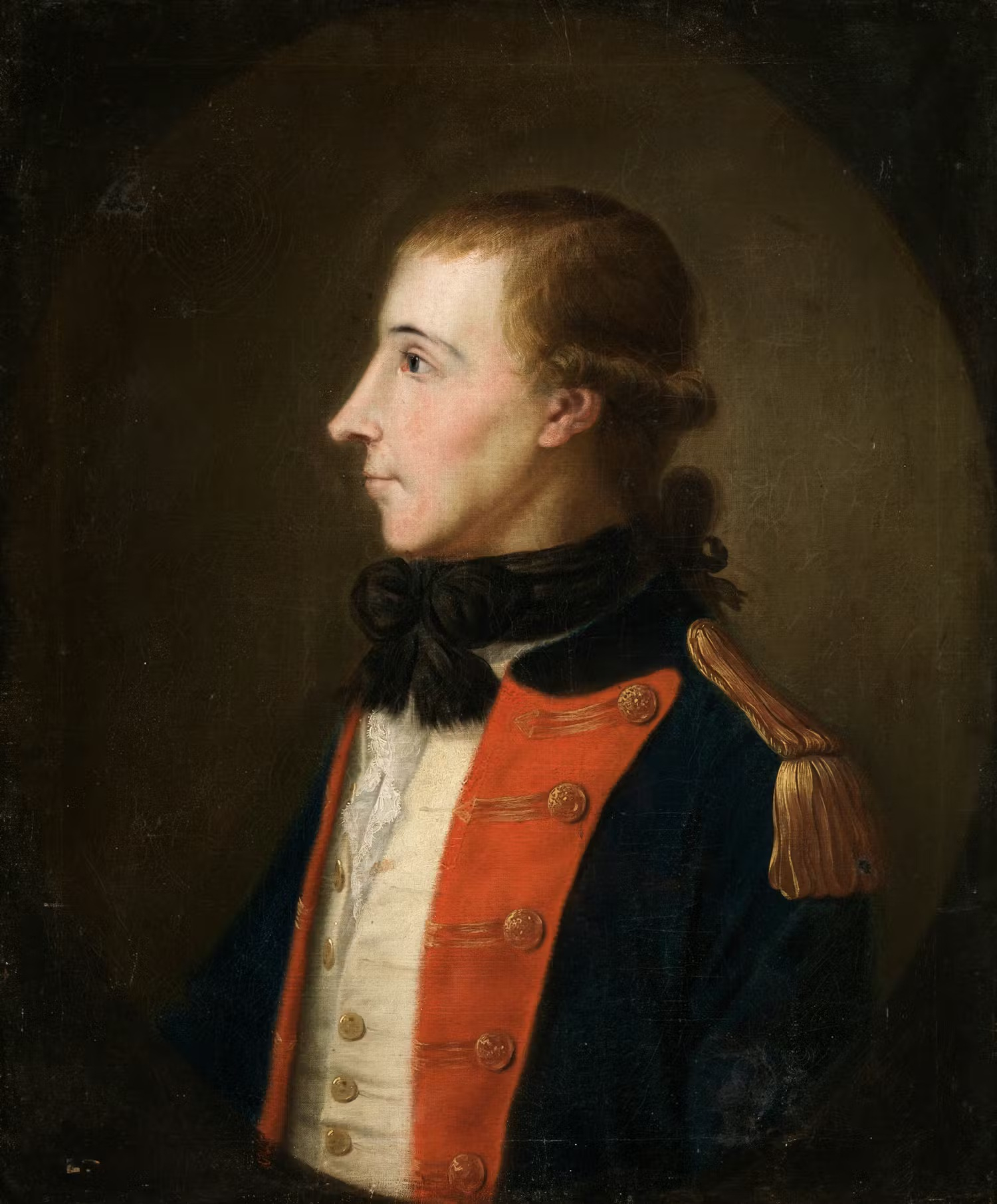
A portrait of Wolfe Tone

In 1789, upon learning of the first waves of uprising in France, the Belfast Newsletter published an editorial praising what would become the French Revolution and its ideals. In 1790, inspired by the events in France, a movement led by Presbyterians lobbied the Irish Parliament for reform; the Northern Whig party was formed. In July 1791, Volunteers gathered at the Exchange on Warring Street in Belfast to celebrate the fall of the Bastille. They marched to the White Linen Hall (modern day Belfast City Hall) where they fired a volley salute to the French revolutionaries. A declaration was presented extolling the French people and inviting their support for revolution in Ireland. This led to the founding of the Society of United Irishmen by Wolfe Tone, Henry Joy McCracken and others. The first meeting of the Society of United Irishmen was exclusively attended by Protestants. The Society of United Irishmen proved to be a more radical nationalist group vying for further independence, an end to religious discrimination and equal representation for Catholics in Ireland. When the Reign of Terror began in France in 1793, it split the United Irishman, with some condemning the violence and others applauding the action being taken to further revolution.

Protestants in Ulster who endorsed Enfranchisement soon found that they knew next to nothing about their Catholic neighbours. Wolfe Tone noted in his diary that many Protestants were "ignorant" of the lifestyle of Catholics. This led to the organising of the Harp gathering in Belfast in 1792 where Gaelic poetry, art, music and language were celebrated. In May 1795, after being implicated in treasonous activity, Wolfe Tone and his family were in Belfast awaiting a ship that would take them into exile. Tone was invited to many dinner parties and excursions by local society. One such outing was a hike up the Cave Hill overlooking the town of Belfast and surrounding areas. It was atop the cliff that Tone and his compatriots vowed that they would not rest until Ireland was free from the "British yoke". Tone's Belfast Presbyterian supporters raised funds to buy his family a small tobacco farm in New Jersey.

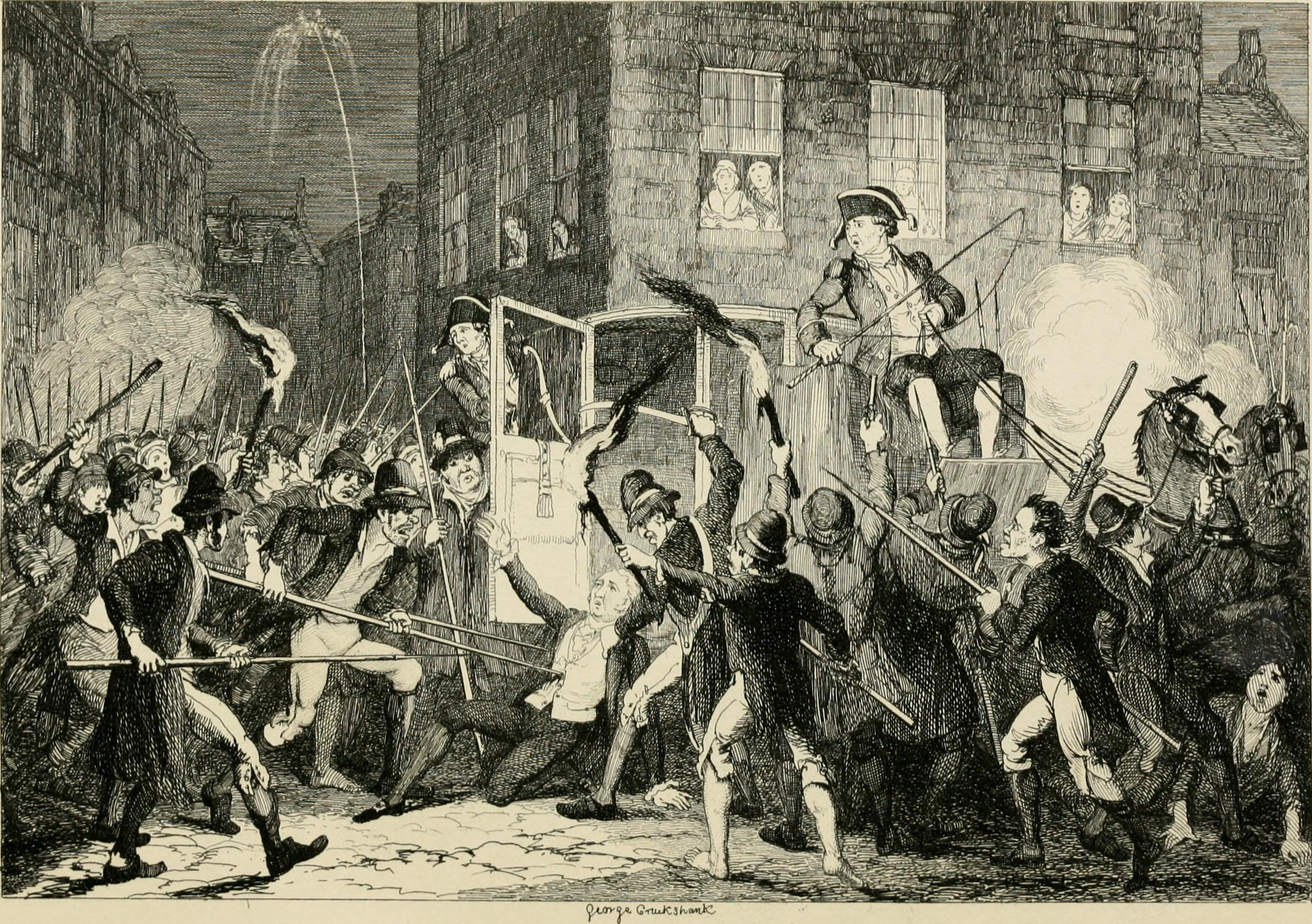
Scene from the Irish Rebellion of 1798

In 1796, with Tone aboard, France launched an armada carrying over 15,000 men to Ireland, only to be prevented from landing by bad weather. The United Irishmen and Catholic Defenders were sensationalised by the attempted French invasion and their recruitment doubled in Ulster in 1797. The British government, fearing insurrection, moved to disarm the people, beginning with Ulster. Lieutenant Gerard Lake wrote in his journal that "...nothing but terror will keep them [Ulster] in order. It is plain that every act of sedition originates in this town [Belfast]." In March 1797, Lake proclaimed martial law and ordered the citizenry to surrender their arms. Weapon searches began in Belfast and Carrickfergus, with more than 5,000 arms seized in the first ten days. Due to spies infiltrating nearly every level of the United Irishmen, Lake was able to capture the organisation's leadership, who were transported to Dublin from Belfast. Now a general, Lake would go on to devastate the United Irishmen's ranks while, at the same time, doing nothing to disarm loyalist Orange Men. In 1798, General Sir Ralph Abercromby was appointed commander-in-chief in Ireland. Abercromby toured Ireland and realised quickly that Lake's forces were out of control and that their brutal tactics were pushing more and more of the populace into rebellion. Abercromby formally censured the Irish army, which outraged leading members of the Irish Government, who responded by forcing Abercromby to resign and Lake to take his place. As a result of Lake's harsh methods, the population rose up in revolt culminating in the Irish Rebellion of 1798. On 17 July 1798, United Irishmen revolutionary leader Henry Joy McCracken was tried on Ann Street. When the Crown Prosecutor offered him his life in exchange for the names of the other rebel leaders, McCraken refused. He was then led to Market House at High Street and Corn Market, where he was hanged.

== Act of Union, direct rule and rapid growth ==
As a consequence of the Rebellion of 1798 and the re-organisation of Britain and Ireland into the United Kingdom, the Irish Parliament was pressured to abolish itself. From that point on, Irish representatives would be sent to Westminster and direct rule would be imposed. Many in Ireland were skeptical of these events, especially when equal rights for Catholics failed to materialise. Presbyterians were also wary of the new United Kingdom but, within a generation, many of these Protestants became ardent supporters of the union, having benefited from it economically. In the 19th century, Belfast became Ireland's pre-eminent industrial city with booming industries in linen, heavy engineering, tobacco and shipbuilding dominating trade. Belfast, situated at the western end of Belfast Lough and the mouth of the River Lagan, was an ideal location for the shipbuilding industry, which would eventually manifest in the Harland and Wolff company. Harland and Wolff were one of the largest shipbuilders in the world employing up to 35,000 workers.

Beginning in the early 19th century, migrants seeking work came to Belfast from across Ireland, Scotland and England, but particularly from rural Ulster, where sectarian tensions ran deep. The same period saw the first outbreaks of sectarian riots, which have recurred regularly since.

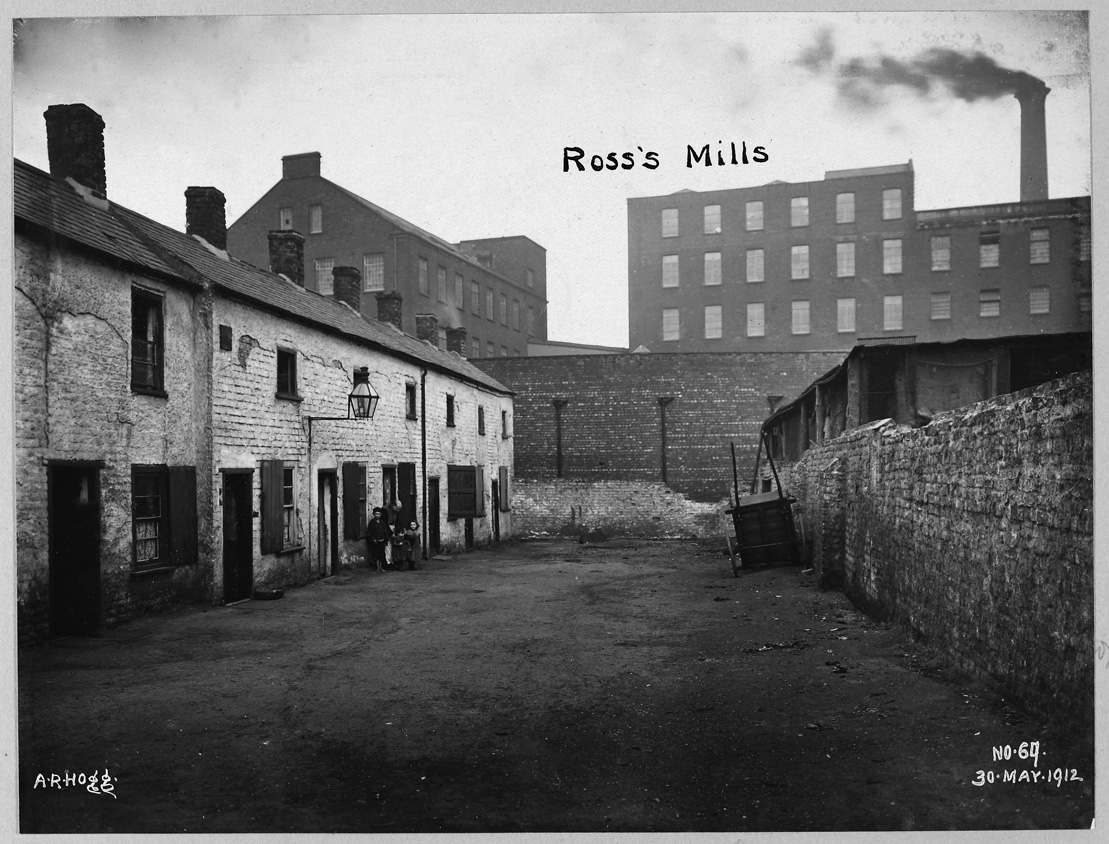
Ross' Mill. Belfast.

Belfast was the one place on the island where the Industrial Revolution had a permanent effect. Belfast Lough received fuel and raw materials for its various industries by sea. Cotton was spun by steam machine or waterpower into mill yarn which was then taken to hand loom weavers along the River Lagan in places like Ballymacarrett and the Catholic Short Strand in east Belfast. It was calculated that, by 1811, there were 150,000 power spindles, producing over 70 million lengths of yarn and employing about 30,000 people. Ten hundred-ton ships brought 6,000 tonnes of coal a year to keep the mills powered. The Belfast cotton industry began to lose momentum after demand decreased at the end of the Napoleonic Wars in 1815. Then, it was discovered in Preston, England in 1825 that deep-soaked flax could be made into yarn by power-spinning machine. Mulholland's Cotton Mill on York Street accidentally burned down 10 June 1828 and was rebuilt and upgraded to spin deep-soaked flax. This mill was enormous, five stories high with three steam engines, 15,300 spindles and a 186-foot-tall chimney. The mill rendered 700 tonnes of yarn from flax each year, making a massive profit. Other flax mills were eventually built throughout Belfast. Industry made Belfast the fastest growing urban centre in the United Kingdom with the population increasing from 19,000 in 1801 to over 70,000 in 1841. By 1836, Belfast had a vibrant chamber of commerce and top-level banking network, which included the Northern Bank, Ulster Bank and Belfast Bank. Though it added to the prosperity of Belfast and its surrounding areas, this mechanised production of material combined with imports from England devastated the cottage industries of Ireland, who failed to compete. This later contributed to rural families' dependence on the potato crop as a staple of their diet. This would have disastrous results in the Great Famine of the 1840s.

Daniel O'Connell began his Repeal the Act of Union movement in 1840 and was invited to speak in Belfast in January 1841. Rev. Henry Cooke, a spokesman for northern Presbyterians, said that "repeal" was "just a discreet word for Rome-ish ascendancy and Protestant extermination." He went on to comment that O'Connell was a "great, bad man engaged in a great, bad cause...". O'Connell abandoned his plans to enter Belfast in the midst of a large crowd of supporters. Anticipating trouble, troops and artillery were called into town to quell any unrest. O'Connell slipped into Belfast on 16 January in disguise. He did not attempt to leave his hotel in Donegall Place to attend mass. He appeared on the balcony of Kern's Hotel on 19 January to speak to a crowd while wearing a flamboyant, repeal-themed outfit complete with white velvet collar and embroidered shamrocks, wolf hounds and round towers. The crowd was mixed, with people either jeering or cheering O'Connell in a cacophony of sound so loud that O'Connell's speech could not be heard. That night, O'Connell attended an event in the May Street Music Hall, while some Belfast locals outside pelted each other with stones and others smashed windows. One stone went through the window at the Kern's Hotel, where O'Connell was staying, and shattered the great chandelier inside. At the office of The Vindicator, the repeal journal in Belfast, it was reported that hardly a pane of glass was left unbroken by rioters, who had to be repelled by the police. O'Connell left Belfast the next day, escorted by four cars full of police. A few days later, Rev. Cook, speaking to a crowd of supporters, extolled the growth of industry and population in Belfast and connected its prosperity directly to its being a part of the United Kingdom.

== Famine, Queen Victoria and Harland & Wolff ==
During the Great Famine, a potato blight that originated in America spread to Europe and decimated crops in Ireland. The Belfast Newsletter predicted the devastating effect the blight would have on the common people of Ireland, particularly in rural areas. The potato crop in 1845 largely failed all over Ireland, with the exception of the west coast and parts of Ulster. One-third of the crop was inedible and fears that the spuds in storage had been contaminated were soon realized. In October 1846, Belfast journal The Vindicator made an appeal on behalf of the starving, writing that their universal cry was "give us food or we perish". The publication went on to scold the United Kingdom for not meeting the basic needs of its people. By 1847, the British government was feeding three million famine victims a day, though many still died from disease brought on by malnutrition. Many of the poor moved eastward from rural areas into Belfast and Dublin, bringing with them famine-related diseases. Dr. Andrew Malcolm, working in Belfast at the time, wrote of the influx of the starving into the town, their horrific appearance and the "plague breath" they carried with them. The Belfast Newsletter reported in July 1847 that the town's hospitals were overflowing and that some of the emaciated were stretched out on the streets, dead or dying.

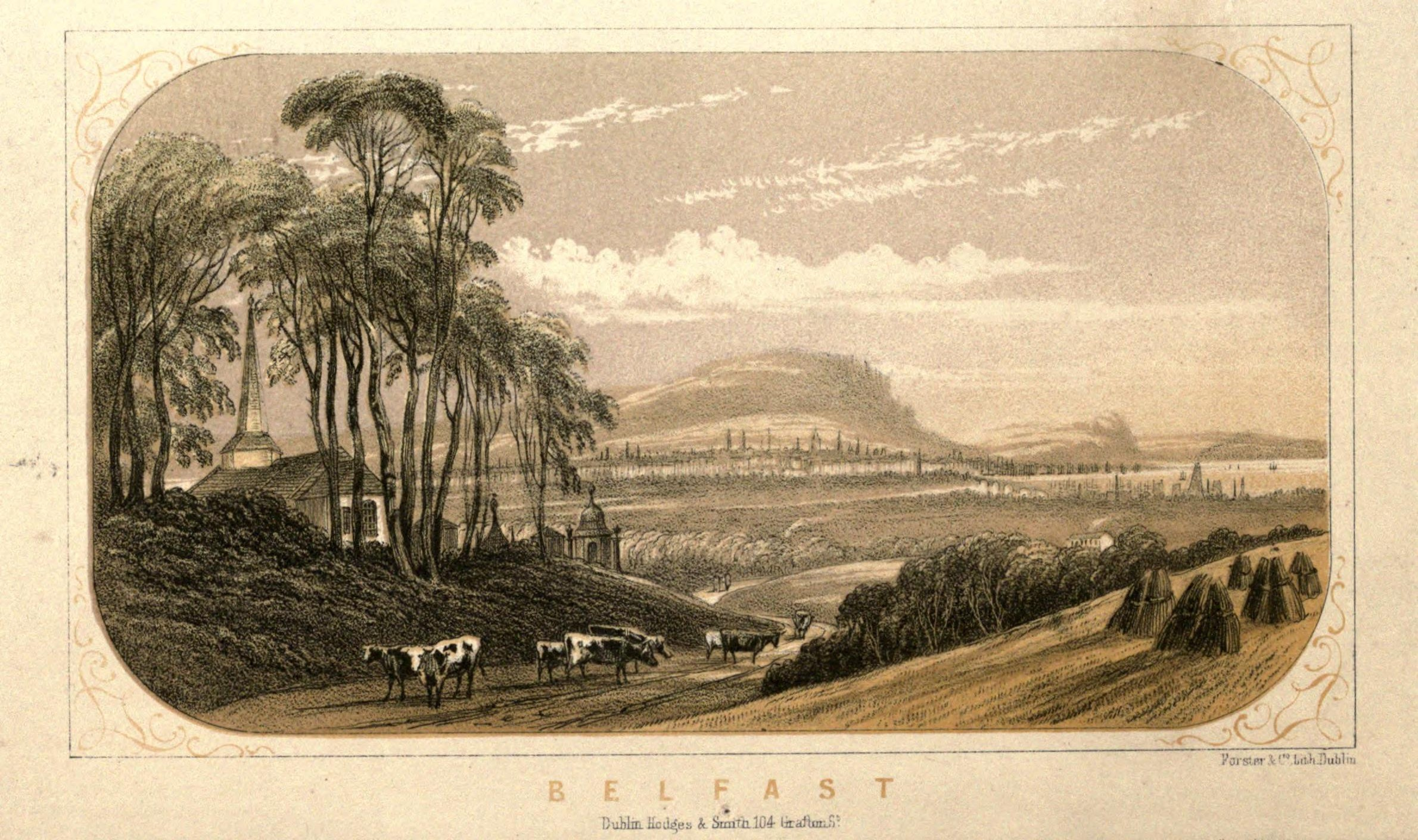
Belfast viewed from the hills in 1852. The new Queen's Bridge across the Lagan can be seen to the right.

On 10 July 1849, the Belfast Harbour commissioners, members of the council, gentry, merchants and the 13th Regiment officially opened the Victoria Channel aboard the royal steamer Prince of Wales. This new waterway allowed for large vessels to come up the River Lagan regardless of the tide. At a signal, a flotilla of sea craft moved up the channel to the adulation of the large crowds that had gathered to watch the event. The spectacle was concluded by a cannon salute and a resounding chorus of "Rule Britannia" by all those present. This new channel fed the growth of Belfast industry, enabling new development, despite being completed during the last years of the Great Famine. Queen Victoria and Prince Albert, along with the Prince of Wales, visited Belfast in August 1849, sailing up Victoria Channel and venturing into the town. They were received jubilantly by the people of Belfast with fanfare and decorations adorning the streets. The royal family moved up High Street amidst rapturous cheers and well-wishing. On the same street, a 32-foot high arch had been built with a misspelled rendering of Irish Gaelic greeting "Céad Míle Fáilte" (a hundred thousand welcomes) written on it. In the White Linen Hall, the Queen viewed an exhibition of Belfast's industrial goods. The royals made their way to Lisburn Road and the Malone Turnpike where Victoria inspected the new Queen's College (later, Queen's University). After touring Andrew Mulholland's mill, Victoria and her entourage returned to their vessel.

Belfast was recovering from a cholera epidemic at the time of the royal visit, and many credited Victoria and Albert with lifting the spirits of the town during a difficult period. Conditions for the new working class were often squalid, with much of the population packed into overcrowded and unsanitary tenements. The city suffered from repeated cholera outbreaks in the mid-19th century. Though both Catholics and Protestants were often employed, Protestants would experience preferment over their Catholic counterparts. Hardly any of those in management were Catholic and Protestants would often receive promotion and desirable positions.

In 1852, Belfast was the first port of Ireland, outpacing Dublin in size, value and tonnage. However, old sectarian tensions soon came to the fore, resulting in an almost annual cycle of summer rioting between Catholics and Protestants. On 12 July 1857, confrontations between crowds of Catholics and Protestants degraded into stones being thrown on Albert Street, and Catholics beating two Methodist ministers in the Millfield area with sticks. The next night, Protestants from Sandy Row went into Catholic areas, smashed windows and set houses on fire. The unrest turned into ten days of rioting, with many of the police force joining the Protestant side. There were also riots in Derry, Portadown and Lurgan. With sporadic gunfire all over Belfast, the police could do little to mitigate the turmoil. The riots of 1864 were so intense that reinforcements and two field guns were dispatched from Dublin Castle. A funeral for a victim of police gunfire turned into a loyalist parade that unexpectedly went up through Donegall Square in the heart of Belfast. Police barely held as a barrier between the Protestants marching through Belfast's main streets and the irate Catholics who were massing at Castle Place. Continuous gunfire resounded throughout the city until a deluge of summer rain dispersed most of the crowd.

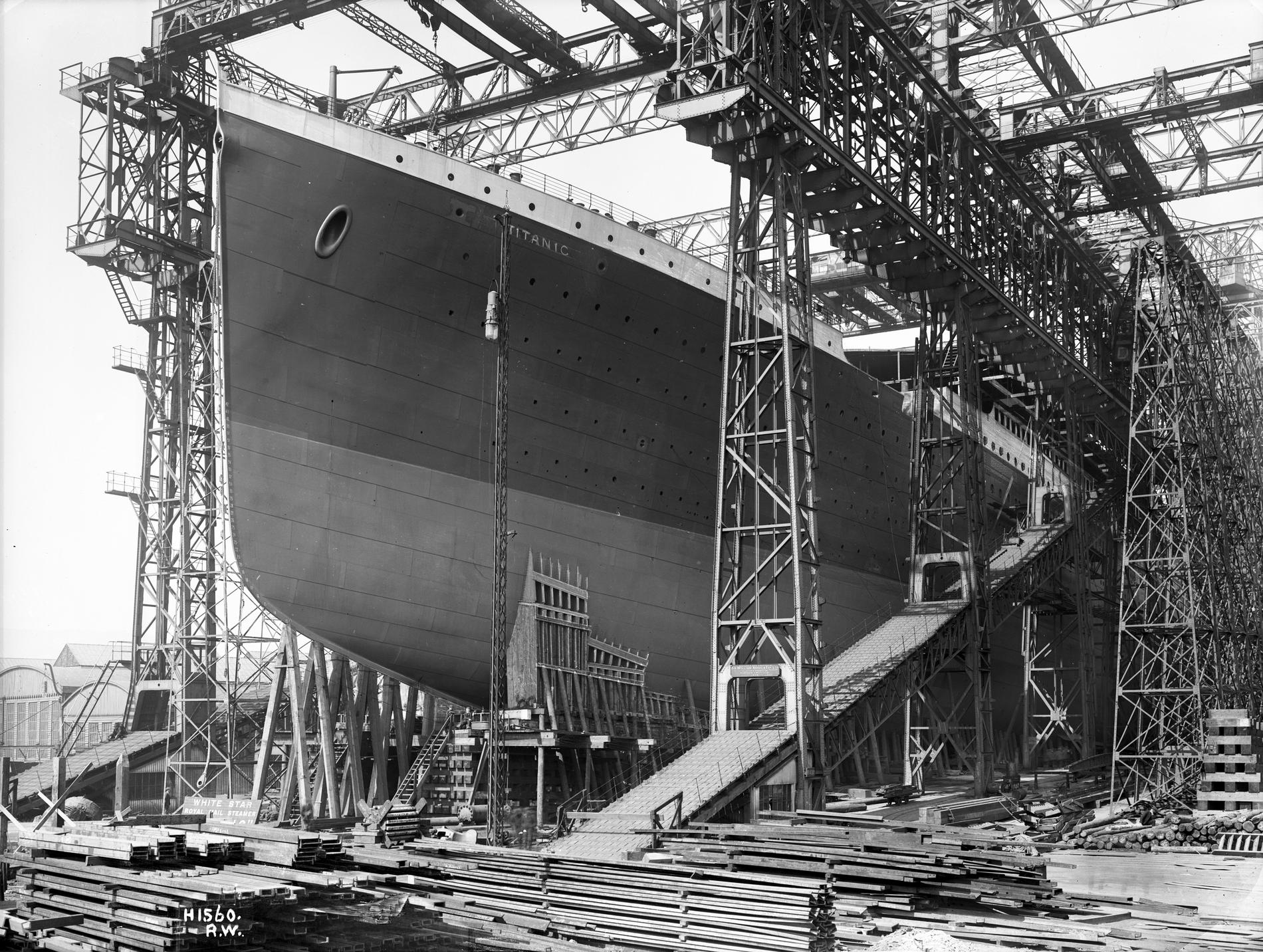
RMS Titanic being prepared for launch from dry-dock at Harland & Wolff in 1911.

The mud that was dredged up to dig the Victoria Channel was made into an artificial island, called Queen's Island, near east Belfast. John Hixon, an engineer from Liverpool who managed the arms work on Cromac Street, decided to use his surplus of iron ore to make ships. Hixon hired Edward Harland from Newcastle-on-Tyne to assist in the endeavour. Harland launched his first ship in October 1855, and his cutting-edge designs would go on to revolutionise the ship building world. In 1858, Harland would buy-out Hixon with the backing of Gustav Schwab. Schwab's nephew, Gustav Wolff had been working as an assistant to Harland. They formed the partnership of Harland & Wolff in 1861. Business was booming with the advent of American Civil War and the Confederacy purchased steamers from Harland & Wolff. Gustav Schwab went on to create the White Star Line in 1869, and ordered all of his ocean vessels from Harland & Wolff, setting the firm on the path to becoming the biggest ship building company in the world. Harland & Wolff would go on to build some of the world's most famous (and infamous) ships including HMHS Britannic, RMS Oceanic, RMS Olympic and, best known of all, the RMS Titanic.

== Home Rule, city charter ==
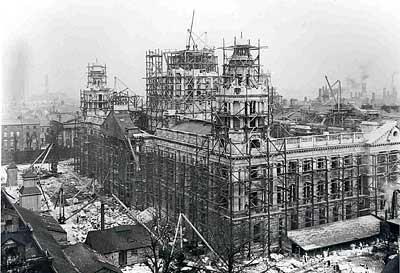
Belfast City Hall during construction

In 1862 George Hamilton Chichester, 3rd Marquess of Donegall (a descendant of the Chichester family) built a new mansion on the slopes of Cavehill above the town. Named the new Belfast Castle, it was designed by Charles Lanyon and construction was completed in 1870. During the summer of 1872, about 30,000 nationalists held a demonstration at Hannahstown in Belfast, campaigning for the release of Fenian prisoners, which led to another series of riots between Catholics and Protestants. In 1874, the issue of Home Rule became mainstream in Irish politics. The Newsletter denounced a number of MPs on the eve of the election, writing that "Home Rule was simply 'Rome Rule'" and that Protestants would not support a new Dublin parliament. In June 1886, Protestants celebrated the defeat of the First Home Rule Bill in the House of Commons, leading to rioting on the streets of Belfast and the deaths of seven people, with many more injured. In the same year, following The Twelfth Orange Institution parades, clashes took place between Catholics and Protestants, and also between Loyalists and police. Thirteen people were killed in a weekend of serious rioting which continued sporadically until mid-September with an official death toll of 31 people. (For more information see: 1886 Belfast riots)

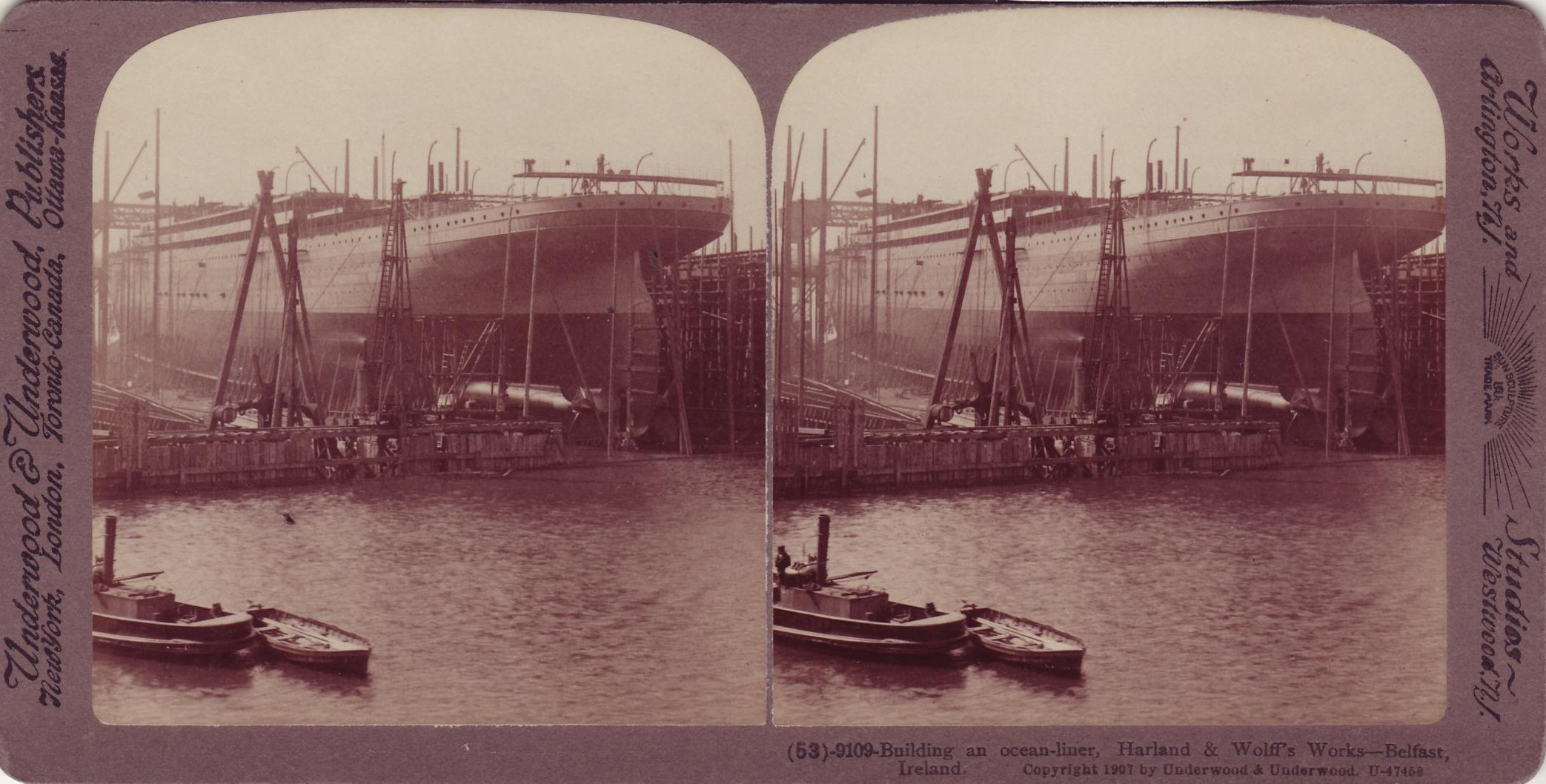
A 1907 stereoscope postcard depicting the construction of an ocean liner at the Harland and Wolff shipyard

Belfast was granted city status in 1888 by Queen Victoria. In 1899, on the coming into effect of the Local Government (Ireland) Act 1898, the city of Belfast became a county borough administratively distinct from County Antrim and County Down. It continues to be seen as straddling both counties, with the River Lagan generally being seen as the line of demarcation. Charles Vane-Tempest-Stewart made a grand visit to Belfast on behalf of the Queen to give it official recognition as a city. Belfast at this time was Ireland's largest city and the third most important port (behind London and Liverpool) in the United Kingdom; and the leader in world trade at the time. Belfast had become a world class industrial city and the center of linen production for the whole planet. In 1893, a Second Home Rule Bill passed through the House of Commons but was defeated in the House of Lords. Wary Protestants celebrated and, as had happened seven years earlier, Catholics were attacked in Belfast's shipyards. An article in the Daily Chronicle (28 April 1893) stated: "Catholic workmen were savagely set upon, kicked, beaten with belts, and chased and pelted with brickbats, stones and iron nuts, with the result that the greater body of the Catholics, who number six hundred, have cleared out to save their lives."

On 14 January 1899, large crowds gathered to watch the launch of the RMS Oceanic, which had been ordered by the White Star Line for trans-Atlantic passenger travel. The Oceanic was the largest man-made moving object that had ever been built up to that time. By the year 1900, Belfast had the world's largest tobacco factory, tea machinery and fan-making works, handkerchief factory, dry dock and color Christmas card printers. Belfast was also the world's leading manufacturer of "fizzy drinks" (soft drinks). Belfast was by far the greatest economic beneficiary in Ireland of the Act of Union and Industrial Revolution. The city saw a bitter strike by dock workers organised by radical trade unionist Jim Larkin, in 1907. The dispute saw 10,000 workers on strike and a mutiny by the police, who refused to disperse the striker's pickets. Eventually the British Army had to be deployed to restore order. The strike was a rare instance of non-sectarian mobilisation in Ulster at the time.

== The Ulster Covenant and rising tensions ==
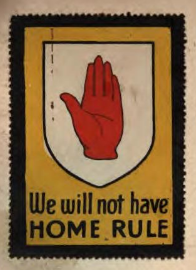
Anti-Home Rule poster depicting The Red Hand of Ulster

At the beginning of the 20th century, 75% of Belfast's population was Protestant and opposed the notion of Home Rule. However, the same percentage of Ireland as a whole were Catholic and in favor of the re-establishment of a parliament in Dublin. In 1910 Irish Unionists chose Edward Carson, a lawyer and former Conservative Party MP for Trinity College Dublin, as their leader. In September 1911, Carson addressed unionist men and members of the Orange Order in Strandtown, east Belfast. He derided the Home Rule movement as a "conspiracy against free people" and called on all men to be ready to establish a government for Protestant Ulster. From 1910, Unionists led by Edward Carson raised a militia, the Ulster Volunteers, to resist Home Rule by force if necessary. The Ulster Unionist Council secretly requested a price quotation from a German arms manufacturer for 20,000 rifles and a million rounds of ammunition. In 1911, Carson and the UCC voted for the first disbursement of funds to be used in the acquisition of arms.

Conservative Party leader Bonar Law visited Belfast on Easter Tuesday 1912. Special trains brought over 100,000 Unionist demonstrators who paraded past the stage in turn at the Balmoral Grounds in Belfast. Those gathered then observed prayers led by the Church of Ireland's Archbishop of Armagh and the Presbyterian Moderator. The largest Union Jack ever created was then unfurled and Bonar Law gave a speech comparing contemporary unionists with their forebears who were besieged in Derry in 1689. Two days later, on 11 April 1912, Prime Minister H. H. Asquith introduced the Home Rule Bill in the Commons. The Third Home Rule Bill was proposed by the Liberal government and would have granted limited autonomy to an all-Ireland Irish Parliament.

Edward Carson poses signing the Ulster Covenant in Belfast City Hall. 1912.

On 28 September 1912 Protestant Unionists met in the Ulster Hall in Belfast to inaugurate the celebration of "Ulster Day" and protest the Third Home Rule Bill. Presbyterian minister Dr. William McKeen gave a sermon where he stated that "The Irish question is, at bottom, a war against Protestantism. It is an attempt to establish a Roman Catholic ascendancy in Ireland. To begin the disintegration of the Empire by securing a second Parliament in Dublin." He went on to pledge that the Ulster Covenant would protect the Protestant people from any incursion by those who would seek their undoing. From there and many other meeting places across the city, Irish Unionists converged on Belfast City Hall at noon, led by Edward Carson and other city officials. Carson proceeded to a round table draped in the Union Flag where he was the first to sign the Ulster Covenant, using a silver pen. The signing was then opened to the general public, to the relief of the stewards who struggled to control the eager crowd.

People continued to sign the Covenant past 11pm, with women signing their own separate declaration. Signatures totaled 471,414 men and women who could prove they were born in Ulster (over 30,000 more women signed than men). Contrary to popular myth, no one actually signed in their own blood. Instead, some made their mark in red ink. After leaving City Hall, Edward Carson's car was pulled along by the hands of the elated crowd as he made his way to the Belfast docks. After boarding a ship to the sound of a rifle salute from the Fusiliers, Carson was destined for Britain where he planned to continue the Ulster Unionist campaign. Carson addressed the cheering throng, saying "I ask you while I'm away in England and Scotland and fighting your battle in the Imperial Parliament, to keep the flag flying. And no surrender!" Bonfires were lit all through the city, the largest conflagration was seen from the Cave Hill overlooking the entire area. Many people in the general public as well as the government did not realise previously how in earnest the Protestants of Ireland were regarding unionism; the Ulster Covenant served to remove all illusion about their staunch opposition to Home Rule.

== Third Home Rule Bill, World War, and partition 1912–1921 ==
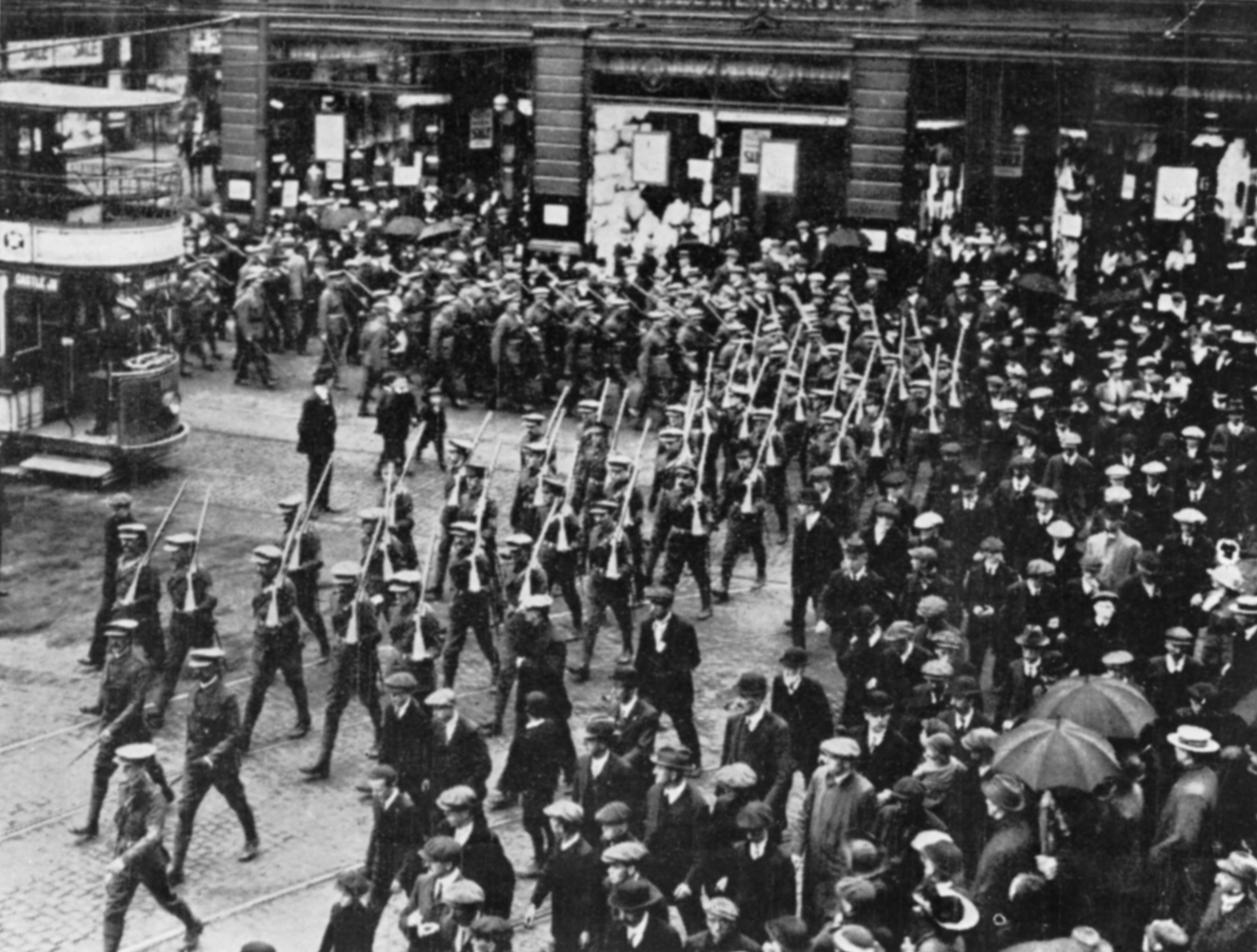
Ulster Volunteer Force parading through Belfast. 1914.

In 1914, after failing to pass an amendment to the Third Home Rule Bill a year earlier, Asquith attempted to avoid civil war in Ireland by introducing several measures proposing that island be partitioned. Unionists demanded that the six north-eastern counties of Ireland (four of which had Protestant majorities) be excluded from Home Rule. The idea was suggested that any county wanting to opt-out of Home Rule might do so for a period of six years. To this, Edward Carson retorted "we do not want a sentence of death with a stay of execution of six years!" He would go on to challenge the British Government in Westminster on implementing Home Rule in Ulster, after which Carson left for Belfast to set up a provisional government. Fearing that the UVF would seize control of the province, Asquith had Winston Churchill order a naval cordon in the Irish Sea. A flotilla set sail and troops were dispatched from all over Ireland into Ulster to prevent an uprising. Sixty cavalry officers from the Curragh base in County Kildare refused to obey the orders, saying they would prefer to be dismissed than lead their men against Ulster loyalists. Their commanding officer assured them in writing that they would not move against the loyalists militarily, for which he was dismissed by Asquith. The delay alerted the UVF, who quietly moved their headquarters to the heavily sandbagged home of James Craig, called "Craigavon", in east Belfast.

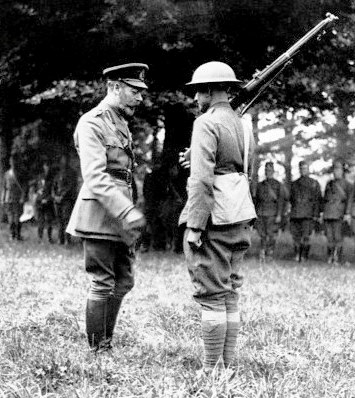
King George V decorating a soldier in 1918.

In April 1914, a shipment of 24,000 rifles with five million rounds of ammunition, or 216 tonnes, arrived in Ireland. The arms had been smuggled from Germany, transferred to a smaller vessel in Wexford and transported up the coast to Ulster. The shipment went undetected, as the authorities were distracted by a decoy ship in Belfast Lough, which allowed the real vessel to be unloaded near Larne and the arms to be dropped for collection throughout the area. Alarmed by the events up north, the almost-defunct Irish Republican Brotherhood was revitalised and, as a direct response to the actions of the UVF, a new generation of Republicans joined the IRB's ranks. John Redmond suspected that the Irish Volunteers were secretly being controlled by the IRB from within and moved to take over the militia, but failed. Observing the success of the UVF in arming, the Irish Volunteers also contacted gun manufacturers in Germany to purchase arms. George V, fearing civil war, became involved and sponsored peace talks in Ulster, which eventually broke down. Edward Carson believed that war was inevitable, saying "we shall have once more to assert the manhood of our race."

Internationally, political tensions resulting from nationalist movements in various European countries were causing diplomatic relations to deteriorate between nations. While considering the various possible outcomes that might result from going to war, some of Germany's generals expressed their belief that the British military would be too preoccupied with civil war in Ireland to respond to anything else happening in Europe. On 3 August 1914. German troops crossed into Belgium, signifying the beginning of World War I. That night, speaking in the Commons, John Redmond declared that all of the King's troops could be withdrawn from Ireland; that Nationalists of the south would "join arms" with that of the Ulstermen in the north. The men of both the UVF and Irish Volunteers by and large joined the British Army in the war against Germany and its allies. Recruitment posters implored men to join the Irish Regiments and reminded them that their first duty was "to their king" regardless of their personal politics. The Great War served to temporarily unite Irishmen in common cause as droves from both sides enlisted and marched together. Edward Carson offered full cooperation and declared that "England's difficulty is not Ulster's opportunity. We do not seek to purchase terms by selling our patriotism." Though they did not care for each other, Carson offered the UVF militia to General Herbert Kitchener, commander of the British forces, with no terms attached. To Carson's surprise, Kitchener agreed to keep the UVF together as the 36th Ulster Division with its command structure mostly intact (Kitchener, however, refused to make a separate division for the Irish nationalists). Redmond urged the Irish Volunteers to fight and defend Ireland as well as the more abstract ideals of freedom and religious equality. By this, he meant joining forces with the British and fighting for the king. Eoin MacNeill refused to fight for the British overseas, and led a minority of 11,000 to form their own militia with the name Irish Volunteers in the split. The majority group, led by Redmond, re-branded as the National Volunteers. By early 1916, at least 210,000 Irishmen had enlisted; 1/3 of the UVF joined and, though Ulster supplied more than half of the Irish recruits, 57% of those who came from Ireland were Catholic. In Belfast, Catholics were more likely to join the military than Protestants. Nearly 28,000 of those who joined to fight in France never returned to Ireland.

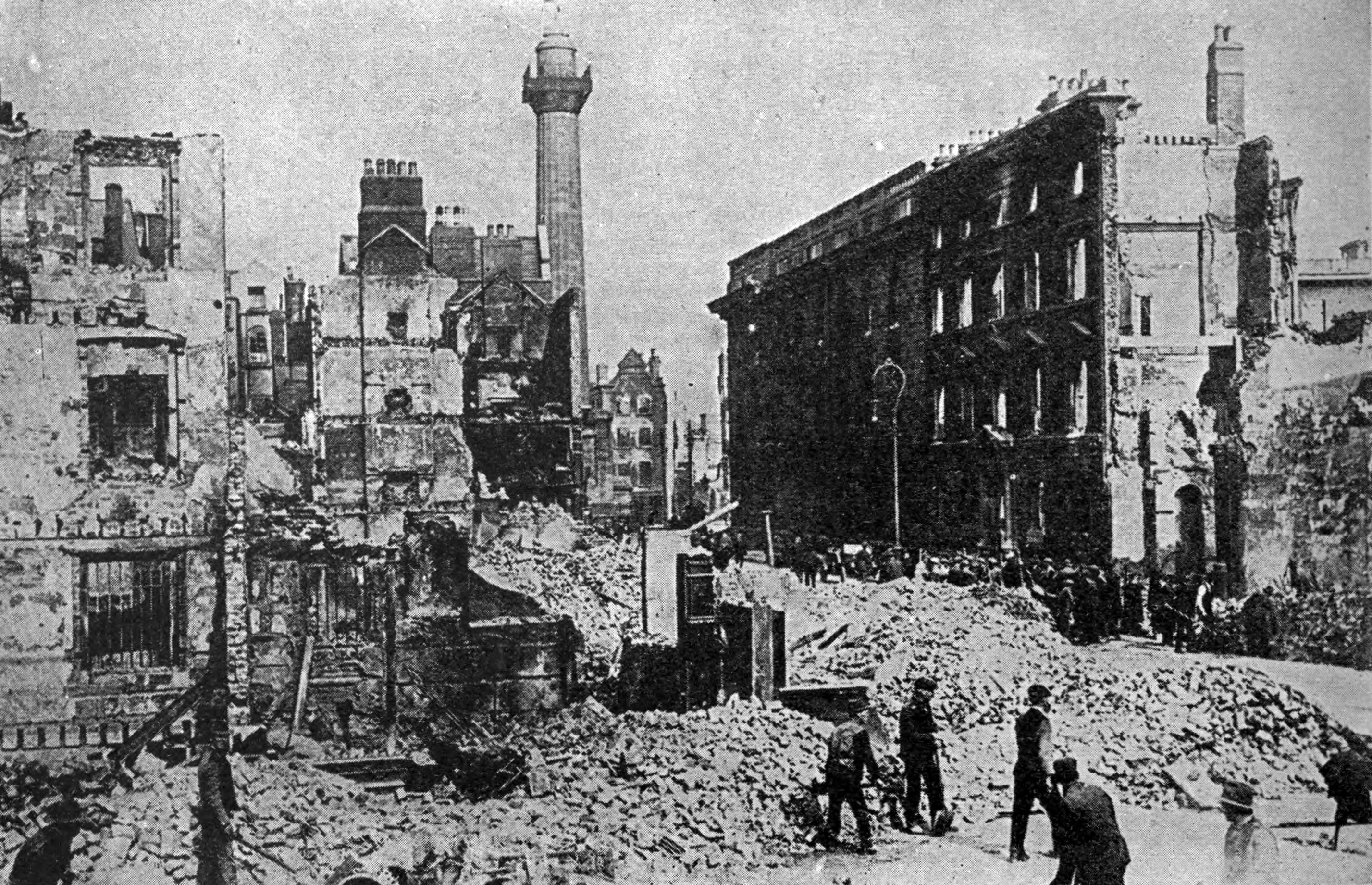
Sackville Street in Dublin during the Easter Rising. April 1916.

Battle of the Somme. Beginning in July 1916.

In July 1916 in France, the 36th Ulster Division was one of the first units to attack German positions during a charge at dawn after a six-day British artillery barrage. The bombardment, however, did not have the desired effect as much of the German barbwire and machine gun nests had been left intact. Despite this, the Ulster Division advanced with remarkable speed, crashing in force into the German 4th line. The Ulstermen came under intense fire from German machine guns and some were accidentally shelled by their own side. On what would be the first day of the Battle of the Somme, Britain suffered over 54,000 casualties; the Ulster Division alone had 5,700 killed or wounded (over 10% of the day's total losses). The battle continued through the summer and into September, when the 36th Ulster Division found themselves fighting alongside the 16th Division, composed of mostly southern, nationalist, Irishmen. In that same year, the Ulster Unionist Council agreed that their goal would be the exclusion of the six northeastern counties from the Dublin Parliament. Because many Irish Nationalists refused to take an oath of allegiance to the King, thus disqualifying themselves from government positions, Unionists were able to fill the void they left and gain more and more political influence in Ireland.

Following the end of the Great War in 1918, issues of Irish independence and the partition of Ireland again came to prominence. The separatist Sinn Féin party won a majority of seats in Ireland, though not in Ulster, where Belfast nationalists continued to vote for members of the Irish Parliamentary Party and unionists for the Unionist Party. Representatives of Sinn Féin refused to sit in the House of Commons, citing their belief that the British had no legitimate right to rule in Ireland. Because they adopted a policy of abstention, the Commons only had the small contingent of the Irish Party representing Irish nationalism, easily outnumbered by Irish Unionists. The Ulster Unionist Council was able to attain nearly all of its constitutional aims for Ulster. The result was a separate territory that would be as large as Unionists could control under their own parliament and jurisdiction. Under the terms of the agreement, six of Ulster's nine counties would be partitioned into a territory to be called "Northern Ireland" and administered by a separate Belfast parliament with the remaining 26 counties being known as "Southern Ireland" and ruled by a semi-autonomous Dublin parliament.

Partition of Ireland. 1920.

Unionists portrayed themselves as making a "great sacrifice" by conceding 26 counties, three of which were part of Ulster. In reality, the arrangement actually suited their interests, as it consolidated their power as a Protestant majority over the North. Some British authorities assumed that having two "Home Rule" parliaments in Ireland would be an acceptable compromise for Nationalists, who were not informed of the proposal beforehand. Counties County Tyrone and County Fermanagh had Nationalist majorities, yet were to be included in Northern Ireland. Despite Edward Carson suggesting that the four most Protestant counties would be viable in 1914, Unionists persisted in including these counties as part of the desired six. On 23 December 1920, amidst political unrest, the Government of Ireland Act 1920 entered the statute book, officially creating Northern Ireland.

Edward Carson privately disagreed with the idea of partition and the devolution of Ulster. Claiming poor health, Carson retired from public life and gave the leadership of the Ulster Unionists to James Craig. Elections on 24 May 1921 gave Unionists a landslide victory with 40 seats, while Sinn Féin and other Irish Nationalists won only six seats each. James Craig became the first Prime Minister of Northern Ireland. Partition did little to settle political turmoil in Ireland. Many Irish Republicans rejected the "British" Dublin parliament and, instead, Sinn Féin took their majority and founded their own separatist assembly, the Dáil Éireann. From January 1919, guerrilla fighting between security forces and the Irish Republican Army (IRA) increased, eventually escalating into the Anglo-Irish War. With the creation of Northern Ireland, violence in Ireland only intensified, though conflict would take on two distinct natures in the north and in the south.

== Conflict in Belfast 1920–1922 ==
The periods immediately before and after partition were marked by major sectarian violence in Belfast as some areas became more dominated by one of the two communities. While occurring simultaneously with the Irish War of Independence, the unrest in Northern Ireland had an identity all its own, with much of the violence happening independently of events in the South. Unlike the rest of Ireland, where the war was largely fought between the IRA and Crown forces, around 90% of the 465 deaths in Belfast were civilian on civilian. Violence occurred in the form of sectarian assassinations and reprisals on random victims. Open, armed clashes between Catholic and Protestants often occurred in the city streets. This particular round of conflict originated in Derry in June 1920, when Catholics burned Protestant homes in the Bogside area of the city after Protestants burned Catholic homes in the Waterside. The Ulster Volunteer Force was revamped to respond to the threat using machine guns to fire randomly into the Catholic Bogside, resulting in several deaths.

On 21 July 1920, rioting broke out in Belfast, starting in the shipyards and spreading to residential areas. The violence was partly in response to the IRA killing in Cork of northern Royal Irish Constabulary police officer Gerald Smyth, and also because of competition for jobs due to the high unemployment rate. Protestant Loyalists marched on the Harland and Wolff shipyards in Belfast and forced over 11,000 Catholic and left-wing Protestant workers from their jobs. This sectarian action is often referred to as the Belfast Pogrom. The sectarian rioting that followed resulted in about 20 deaths in just three days. Both Catholics and Protestants were expelled from their homes by the other side, sometimes by fire. The further IRA assassination of an RIC Detective Swanzy in nearby Lisburn on 22 August prompted another round of clashes, in which 33 people died in 10 days. The year 1921 saw three major flare-ups in Belfast. Just before the truce that formally ended the Irish War of Independence, Belfast suffered a day of violence known at the time as 'Belfast's Bloody Sunday'. An IRA ambush of an armoured police truck on Raglan Street killed one RIC man, injured two more and destroyed their armoured car. This sparked ferocious fighting in west Belfast on the following day, Sunday 10 July, in which 16 civilians (eleven Catholics and five Protestants) died and 161 houses were destroyed. Gun battles raged all day along the sectarian 'boundary' between the Falls and Shankill Roads; rival gunmen used rifles, machine guns and hand grenades. Four more would die over the following two days The second spike in violence happened from 29 August to 1 September, in which twenty people were killed. The third eruption was in November, when more than thirty died in response to the IRA bombing city trams taking Protestant workers to the shipyards, killing seven people.

George V offered to open Northern Ireland's parliament on 22 June 1921. The king made this decision hoping to quell the continual violence that raged in places like Belfast and Derry. Prime Minister David Lloyd George saw the occasion as an opportunity to include Sinn Féin. When the king arrived, Belfast was awash with British flags, royal portraits and cheering throngs. George V addressed a gathering of Unionists and their wives in Belfast City Hall. (Nationalists vowed not to attend). In his speech, the king expressed his hope that his presence in Ireland would help put an end to strife of the people regardless of "their race or creed". He went on to implore all the Irish to forgive and live with each other in peace and harmony. The king later privately remarked that he was very glad he came to Northern Ireland though many of his advisors were against the idea. The day after the monarch's departure, the IRA blew up a train carriage carrying the king's cavalry escort en route to Dublin, killing four men and 80 horses. A truce (which was to become the end of the war) was then agreed and came into effect on 11 July 1921, opening negotiations between Irish Republicans and the British government.

Negotiations saw the establishment of a Boundary Commission to reconsider the border between Northern Ireland and the south, the possibility of the 26 counties being given status as a "free state" and the requirement of an Oath of Allegiance for all Irishmen. Both Craig and Carson vehemently opposed the Boundary Commission, fearing it would greatly diminish the existing area of Northern Ireland (in the end, the border hardly changed at all). The truce had little effect in the north as violence peaked in the first half of 1922, after the Anglo-Irish Treaty confirmed the partition of Ireland into Northern Ireland and the Irish Free State. Michael Collins, a leader in the Republican movement and commander of the IRA, covertly sent arms and aid to the northern IRA with the aim both of defending the Catholic population there and sabotaging the government of Northern Ireland in hopes of its collapse. Loyalists recognised the IRA's tactic of subversion and openly attacked Catholic neighbourhoods, which were somewhat defended by IRA gunmen. Roughly thirty people were killed in Belfast in February 1922, sixty in March and another 30 in April. Recurring cycles of violence continued until the summer of 1922. In response to this most recent conflict, the First Dáil imposed a boycott on goods produced in Belfast from 6 August 1920, which proved to be ineffective.

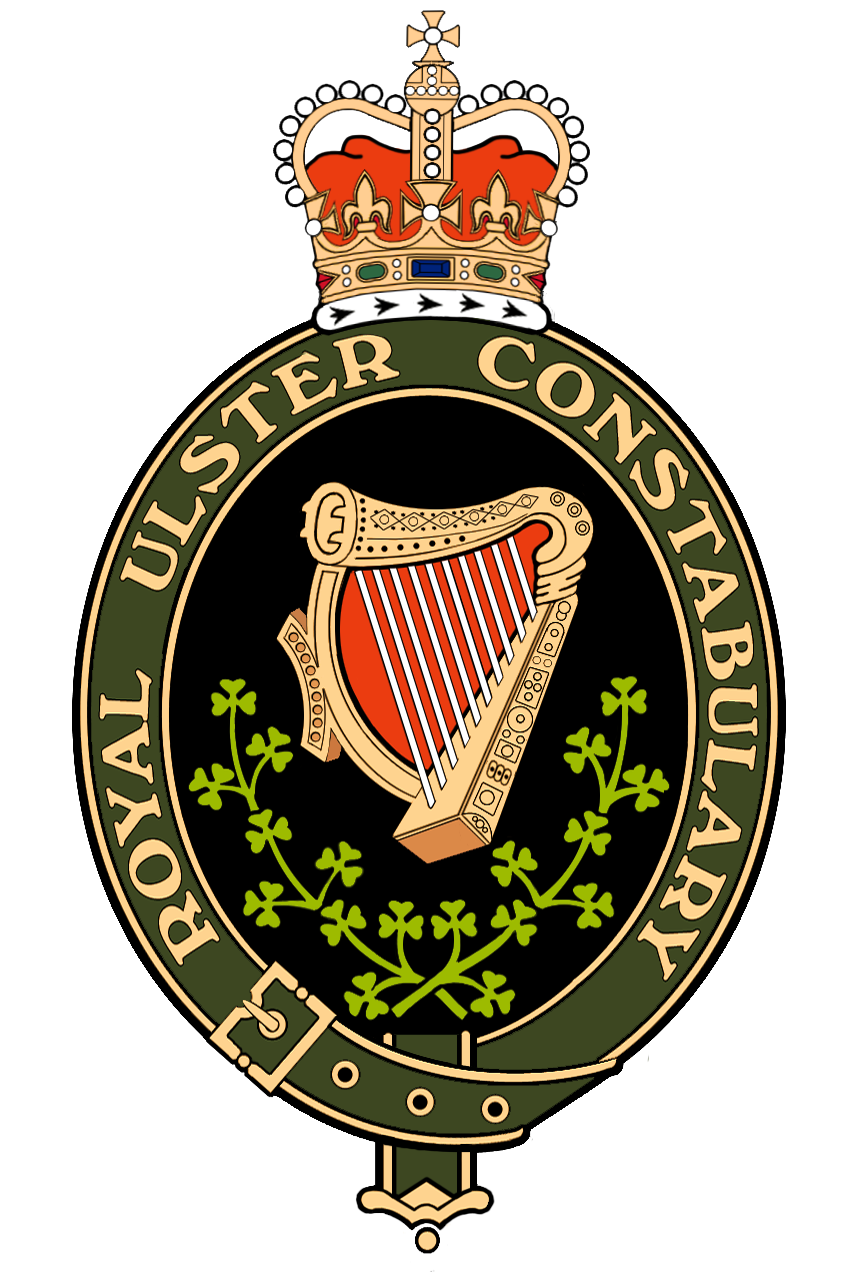
Royal Ulster Constabulary emblem

Instead of sending the controversial Black and Tans into Northern Ireland, the British government assisted the Royal Irish Constabulary (RIC) by establishing a Special Constabulary that would eventually evolve into the Royal Ulster Constabulary (RUC). The Ulster Special Constabulary (USC), was recruited for counter-insurgency purposes. This police force consisted of three tiers of servicemen; the A-Specials were uniformed and paid, the B-Specials (the largest section) were uniformed volunteers patrolling mostly their own areas and the C-Specials were a reserve unit. From the onset, the USC was almost exclusively Protestant with members of the prewar UVF and its commanders joining the B-Specials. Members of both police forces (RIC and USC) were involved in carrying out reprisal attacks on Catholics. When the Constabulary was placed under the control of the Northern Ireland government, Craig expanded the B-Specials in an effort to re-establish order in the country. On 29 April 1922, George V granted to the police force the title of Royal Ulster Constabulary.

Meanwhile, IRA actions in Belfast, such as the killing of police, resulted in more retaliation attacks directly on the Roman Catholic population by loyalists, sometimes covertly aided by state forces. Atrocities and assassinations were perpetrated by both sides across Belfast. The McMahon Murders of 26 March 1922, and the Arnon Street Massacre of a week later, in which uniformed police shot a total of twelve Catholic civilians dead in reprisal for the killings of policemen, were two of the worst incidents. On 22 May, the IRA assassinated unionist politician William Twaddell, in Belfast. Immediately afterwards, the Civil Authorities (Special Powers) Act (Northern Ireland) 1922 was passed in an effort to stop the chaos. Internment (arrest and imprisonment without trial) was introduced, and over 350 IRA men were arrested in Belfast, crippling its organisation there. In June 1922, after the Treaty was approved by public referendum, the Republican movement in the South split into two warring factions; the Pro-Treaty and Anti-Treaty forces, marking the beginning of the Irish Civil War that would last almost a year and result in several war crimes and travesties between southern Irishmen. In the North, the cycle of sectarian atrocities against civilians in Belfast continued into the summer of 1922. May saw seventy-five people killed in Belfast, and another 30 died there in June. Several thousand Catholics fled the violence and sought refuge in Glasgow and Dublin. However, after this crisis, the violence declined rapidly. Only six people died in July and August and the final conflict-related killing took place in October 1922.

Two factors contributed to the rapid end to the conflict during this period; the first was the collapse of the northern IRA as a result of internment. The second was the outbreak of the Irish Civil War in the south, which diverted the IRA's attention from Northern Ireland to the Free State, largely ending the violence in the former while increasing it in the latter. The death toll in Northern Ireland between July 1920 and July 1922 was 557 men, women and children; 303 were Catholics, 172 Protestants and 82 members of the security forces. In Belfast, 236 people had been killed in the first months of 1922 but there was not a single sectarian murder in the city between 1923 and 1933 Northern Ireland was reputed to have one of the lowest crime rates in Europe during this period.

== Capital of Northern Ireland ==
In 1922, the Northern Ireland government sought to establish its authority; it started by suppressing 21 Nationalist local authorities who had pledged their allegiance to the Dail. In July, legislation was rushed through to abolish proportional representation in local government elections. This went unchecked by Westminster, as Prime Minister David Lloyd George was preoccupied with the divisions in his coalition government and was unwilling to intervene. As Nationalist groups refused to cooperate with the NI government, Unionists found themselves in a position to determine electoral districts without being challenged. This free hand resulted in blatant gerrymandering in favor of the Unionist Party. For example, in one district, Nationalists cast 5,381 more votes than Unionists but the electoral boundaries gave Unionists a majority of 18 seats over Nationalists. Joseph Devlin, the MP from west Belfast, concluded that Nationalists could no longer afford to abstain from taking their seats, effectively giving Unionists free rein, and decided to attend the NI Parliament to mitigate any further damage.

Article 12 of the Anglo-Irish Treaty provided for a boundary commission to be set up to review the current territories of Northern Ireland and the Irish Free State. After the Irish Civil War ended, James Cosgrave, the leader of the Irish government, sought to invoke article 12, and Eoin MacNeill (of the Irish Volunteers) was appointed to represent the Free State. Most Nationalists expected large areas of Northern Ireland to be turned over to the Free State. In April 1925, James Craig called a snap election to demonstrate Unionist solidarity against the Boundary Commission, using the now famous catchphrase "not an inch". But Article 12 proved to be too vague, making provisions for the will of the people as well as economic and geographical ties. The argument was then made that Derry and Newry were too financially bound to Belfast to be separated and therefore had to stay in the six counties. A leaked report published in the Morning Post newspaper on 7 November 1925 detailed the conclusions of the commission. Parts of Donegal and Monaghan were conceded to Northern Ireland, with only the town of Crossmaglen going to the Free State; the population of NI would ultimately be reduced by only 1.8%. MacNeill resigned in protest, Cosgrave and Craig (the latter had hitherto refused to participate in the commission) rushed to London to meet with the new Prime Minister, Stanley Baldwin, where they agreed to suppress the Boundary Commission and keep the border as it was. In December 1925, Craig returned to a hero's welcome in Belfast, where shipbuilders presented him with a gold-mounted portion of a foot rule for the "inch he had not surrendered". The idioms "not an inch" as well as "no surrender" (the latter in reference to the Siege of Derry and later used by Edward Carson against Home Rule) would become popular sayings among Unionists, particularly loyalists, in Northern Ireland.

In 1928, ten nationalists sat in the Northern Ireland Commons and, yet, received no acclaim for their willingness to cooperate and returning to their seats. The only bill the Nationalists got through from 1928 to 1972 was the Wild Birds Protection Act (Northern Ireland) 1931. In 1929, James Craig (who had been awarded a peerage and was now Lord Craigavon) abolished proportional representation in parliamentary elections. Though the impact was most felt by smaller parties, Nationalists considered this another harsh measure to oppress the minority. Three years later, speaking in the Commons, Joseph Devlin castigated the Unionist party for snubbing the willingness of Nationalists to cooperate, favoring "old party lines" and treating one-third of the population as political pariahs.

The economic boom from World War I had dissipated by 1922, and 23% of Northern Ireland was now unemployed. No one had predicted the economic slump and, while some blamed the Unionist government, this is now believed to have resulted from Westminster not giving Northern Ireland enough power over their own financial policy. Similar effects were felt in Britain, as the Great War had changed the nature of international trade. The 1929 Stock Market Crash in New York had wide-reaching effects around the world in places like Northern Ireland. Economic interests in the province, particularly large industries like shipbuilding, were hit hard. In Belfast, Harland & Wolff did not launch a single ship between December 1931 and May 1934. By January 1933, the volume of international trade was only one-third of what it had been before the Crash. The Workman, Clark and Company shipyard closed down permanently in 1935.

In early 1932, sectarian tensions increased, to the alarm of the Unionist community, as Éamon de Valera (a staunch Republican leader and Easter Rising veteran) assumed the premiership of Free State Ireland. When the Church of Ireland announced plans to commemorate the coming of Saint Patrick to Ireland, a Catholic cardinal, Cardinal Joseph MacRory, commented publicly that "the Protestant church in Ireland – and the same is true of the Protestant Church anywhere else – is not only not the rightful representative of the early Irish church, but it is not even a part of the Church of Christ." This brought Protestant outrage, pushing tensions to the breaking point and Loyalists responded in June 1932 by attacking Catholic pilgrims returning to Belfast on public transport from the Eucharistic Congress in Dublin. Denouncements of Catholicism grew louder as the Loyalist summer marching season came closer. The situation was made worse by the fact that many of Northern Ireland's unemployed were in a state of privation and some were starving.

On 30 September 1932, MPs in Northern Ireland's House of Commons shouted in protest over the 78,000 unemployed and their lack of food. One MP threw the mace on the floor and accused the House of hypocrisy. On 3 October 1932, 60,000 unemployed Catholics and Protestants marched together in solidarity to a torch-lit rally at the Custom House. The bands who marched alongside the protesters were careful not play any sectarian songs, and instead opted to perform the popular tune "Yes, We Have No Bananas". On 11 October, crowds formed up on Templemore Avenue in east Belfast and began to march. The police, drawing their batons, were given the order to charge and stormed into the crowds; some marchers were beaten, many fled. Rioting broke out on the Lower Falls Road and police, armed with rifles, fired and mortally wounded one Catholic and one Protestant. News spread to the nearby Shankill Road, a traditionally loyalist area, where a woman in a shawl was quoted by a reporter from The Irish Press as shouting "they're kicking the shite out of the Peelers [police] up the Falls! Are you's going to let them down!?" Shankill Protestants ran the few blocks to aid the mostly Catholic rioters against the police in a rare episode of non-sectarian unity. Shocked, the government conceded to their demands and increased aid to the unemployed of Northern Ireland, pacifying the population.

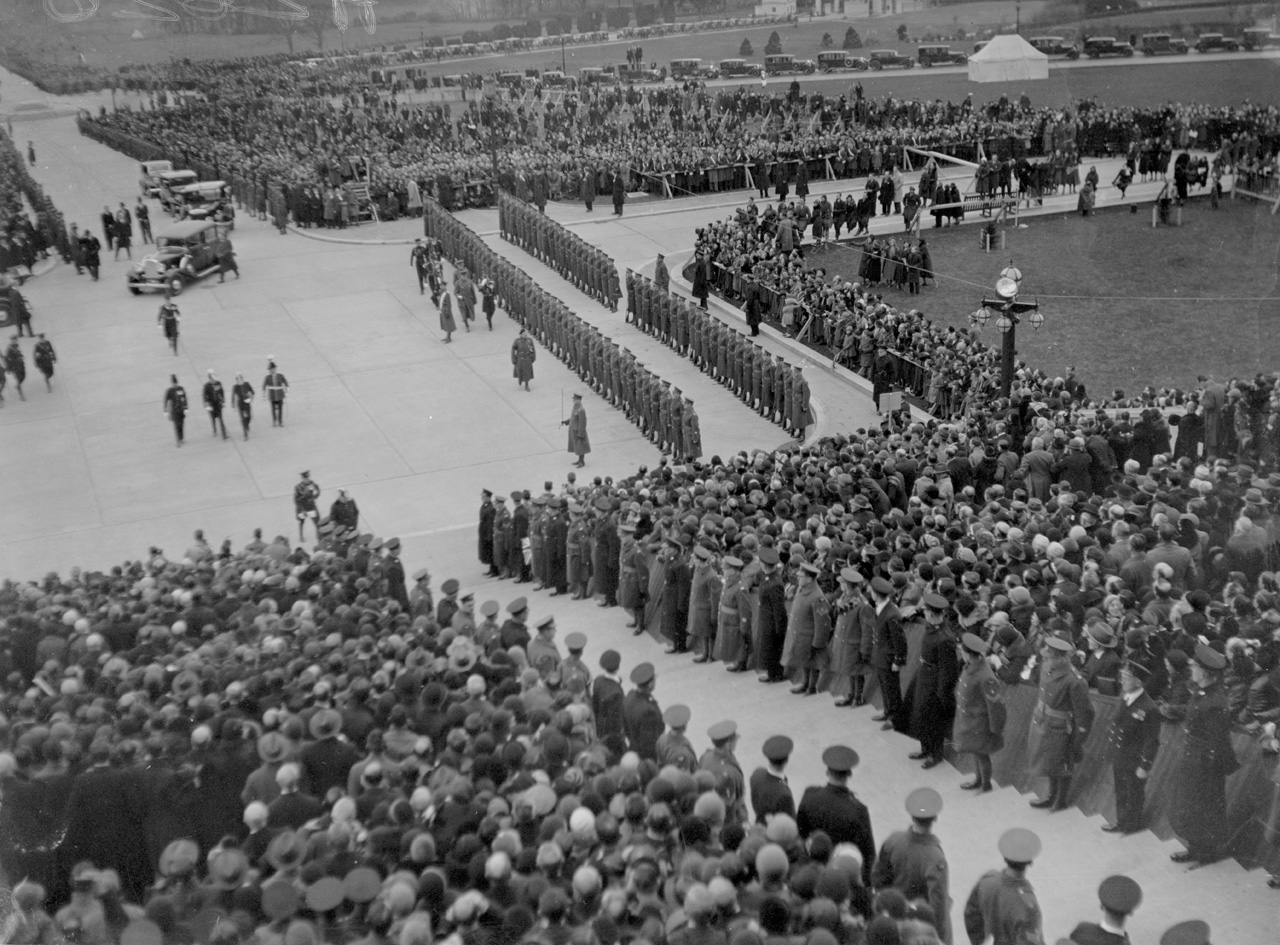
Opening ceremony of the new parliament buildings east of Belfast, 1932

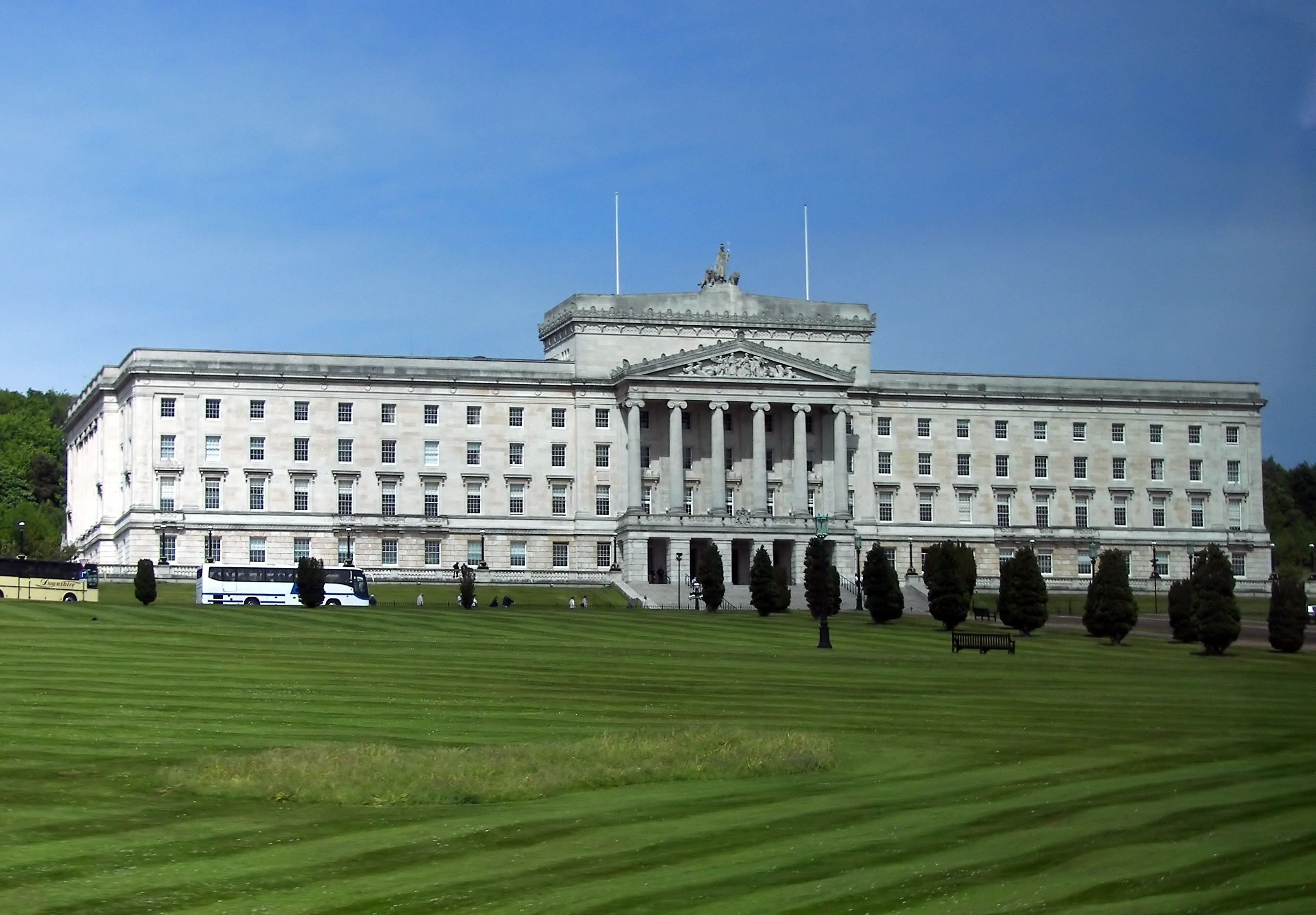
The parliament buildings at Stormont

As the largest city in Ulster, Belfast became the capital of Northern Ireland, and a grand parliament building was finished at Stormont Estate in 1932. The Government of Northern Ireland was dominated by upper and middle class unionists. Being out of touch with the working class, they allowed many of the needs of low-income families to go unaddressed. Conditions in the poorer parts of Belfast remained bad; many houses were damp, overcrowded and lacked basic amenities such as hot water and indoor toilets until about the 1970s. In 1933, tensions again were heightened as a Unionist MP, Sir Basil Brooke, referencing the comments made by Cardinal MacRory the previous year, challenged Protestants of Ulster to hire only other Protestants.

There were a great number of Protestants and Orangemen who employed Roman Catholics. He [Sir Basil Brooke] felt he could speak freely on this subject as he had not a Roman Catholic about his place ... He would point out that the Roman Catholics were endeavouring to get in everywhere and were out with all their force and might to destroy the power and constitution of Ulster. There was a definite plot to overpower the vote of Unionists in the north. He would appeal to Loyalists, therefore, to employ Protestant lads and lassies. — Fermanagh Times

The speech was condemned by a Catholic MP, who sought an official rebuke. When the Catholic MP appealed to Viscount Craigavon, the Prime Minister replied that he did not know of one person who did not agree with the sentiments of the Unionist MP. Craigavon went on to state that he was "an Orange Man first and a politician and member of this Parliament afterwards. The honorable member must remember that, in the South, they boasted of a Catholic state. All that I boast is that we are Protestant parliament and a Protestant state."

The year 1935 saw another summer of tension as the Church of Ireland Bishop of Down appealed to the public to forget the "unhappy past" and endeavor to work together. In response, at the Belmont Field, Orange Order Grand Master Sir Joseph Davison asked rhetorically "are we to forget that the flag of Empire is described as foreign flag? And our beloved King insulted by Mr. De Valera? Are we to forget that the aim of these people is to establish an all-Ireland, Roman Catholic state in which Protestantism is to be crushed out of existence?" That night, as the observers at Belmont Field returned to Belfast, fierce fighting broke out on York Street, which raged for days. When calm returned eight Protestants and five Catholics had been killed and 2,000 Catholics had been driven from their homes.

The Constitution of Ireland proposed by Éamon de Valera and approved by Irish voters in 1937, contained a claim in articles 2 and 3 to the entire island of Ireland. The constitution recognised the special position of the Catholic Church as the faith of "the great majority of the citizens", while also recognising named Protestant churches. Craigavon called the 1938 Northern Ireland general election to show his contempt for the Irish Constitution, with the Unionists winning a crushing majority over Nationalists and others. By February 1938, nearly a third of industrial workers were unemployed. Eyewitnesses recall seeing barefoot children at the Albertbridge pens in Belfast hoping to get unwanted, unsterilised milk before the cattle were shipped to England. Belfast Corporation would only build 2,000 council houses between the World Wars and many were built with inferior materials amidst accusations of corruption. Malnutrition was also a major issue for families both in the Free State and Northern Ireland, with a 9.6% infant mortality rate in Belfast, compared with 5.9% in Sheffield, England. It was stated in Stormont that maternity was more dangerous in Northern Ireland than in England or the Free State, with maternal mortality rising by a fifth between 1922 and 1938. Tuberculosis was also a concern, killing many young people in Belfast and other areas.

== Second World War ==
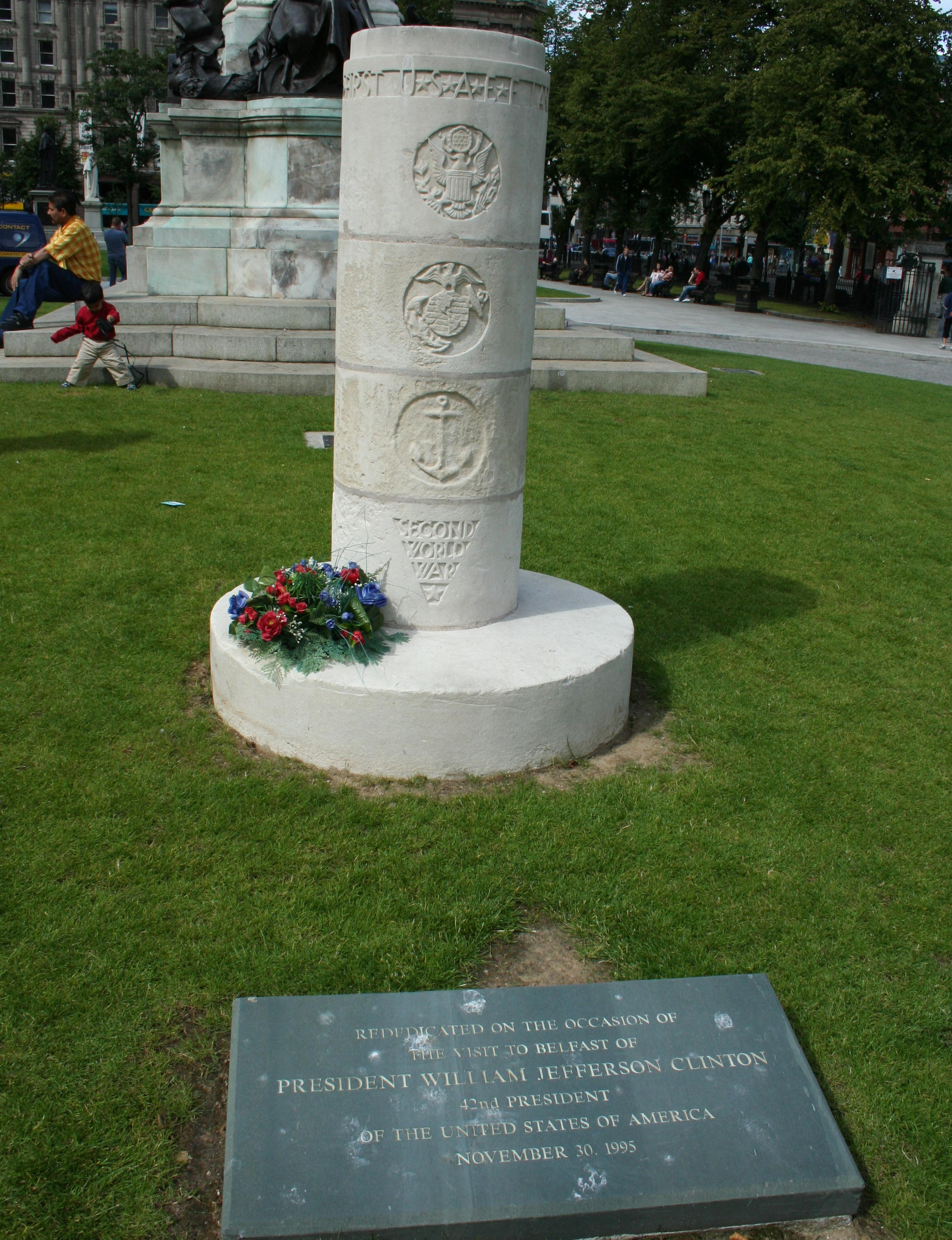
Monument to the United States of America Expeditionary Force (USAEF) and rededication plaque by US President Bill Clinton on the grounds of Belfast City Hall

During the Second World War, Belfast was one of the cities in the United Kingdom that the Germans bombed the most. The British government had thought that Northern Ireland would be safe from German bombing because of its distance from German positions, and so had done very little to prepare Belfast for air raids. Few bomb shelters were built and the few anti-aircraft guns the city possessed had been sent to England. The Belfast Blitz occurred on Easter Tuesday, 15 April 1941. Two hundred German Luftwaffe bombers attacked the city, pounding working class areas of Belfast around the shipyards and north Belfast, in particular, the New Lodge and Antrim Road areas. About a thousand people died and many more were injured. Of Belfast's housing stock, 52% was destroyed. Outside London, this was the greatest loss of life in a single raid during the war. Roughly 100,000 of the population of 415,000 became homeless. Belfast was targeted due to its concentration of heavy shipbuilding and aerospace industries. Ironically, during the same period the local economy made a recovery as the war economy saw great demand for the products of these industries.

== The Troubles ==
The post-war years were relatively placid in Belfast, but economic decline and sectarian tensions added to resentment among the Catholic population as widespread discrimination festered below the surface. Inspired by the American Civil Rights Movement, and Martin Luther King Jr in particular, Catholics and Protestants formed the Northern Ireland Civil Rights Association (NICRA). The NICRA's stated goals included equal housing rights, voting rights (one man, one vote), proportional representation and an end to job discrimination. Many unionists and loyalists feared the NICRA and similar groups were a front for a more subversive movement whose real aim was to destabilise the state of Northern Ireland. Citing examples like Michael Collins' Northern IRA campaign to undermine the Belfast government during the Anglo-Irish War, Protestants in the 1960s feared Catholics would attempt to topple the Northern Ireland government in hopes that the country would become a failed state, be severed from the United Kingdom and subsequently join with the Republic of Ireland. These fears were exacerbated as protest marches and demonstrations were organised across the country. One such march in August 1968 near Derry was violently broken up by the Royal Ulster Constabulary, and the melee was filmed and broadcast on the evening news. In the immediate aftermath, violence erupted across the country and sectarian rioting broke out in the city of Belfast. In response to RUC actions outside Derry, Catholic and Protestant students from Queen's University and other civil rights activists organised a protest against police brutality but the march was halted by loyalists spurred on by the Rev. Ian Paisley, who called for Ulstermen to stand up against "insurrection".

The perceived one-sidedness of the police and the failure of the IRA to defend Catholic neighbourhoods of the city helped cause a schism in the IRA. The discord caused a split, with the older leadership continuing as the Official IRA and a more militant Provisional Irish Republican Army (PIRA) formed, headed by a new generation of Irish Republicans. The PIRA or "Provos" subsequently launched an armed campaign against security forces, British infrastructure, the state of Northern Ireland as well as Great Britain.

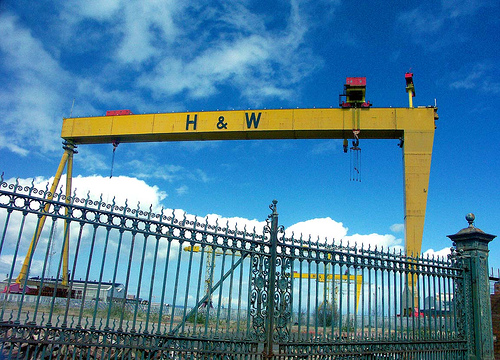
Samson & Goliath shipyard cranes, completed 1969–1974

Violence intensified in the early 1970s, with rival paramilitary groups formed on both sides. The British Army was deployed in 1969 as a peacekeeping force and originally were seen as protectors against Protestant aggression. Irish nationalist opinion shifted when the Army was ordered to support RUC weapons raids on nationalists' homes. Incidents such as the Falls Curfew of July 1970 further worsened relations between the Army and working-class Catholics.

In the early 1970s, there were huge forced population movements as families, mostly but not exclusively Roman Catholic, who lived in areas dominated by the other community were intimidated from their homes, either directly or indirectly. As recently as 1971, the city and surrounding area had a large Protestant majority, but as of 2011 it was almost evenly balanced. This fundamental demographic change has been attributed to higher Catholic birth rates and rising prosperity, together with Protestant emigration, both internal, e.g., to North Down, and external. The Ulster Volunteer Force killed 15 people in the McGurk's Bar bombing in 1971. In an attempt to maintain order, the British Government re-introduced internment; in August 1971, the British Army launched Operation Demetrius which rounded up 343 suspected Republican terrorists. They did not detain anyone from the Loyalist side.

In response to the events of Bloody Sunday, which also led to the eventual demise of the NICRA, the PIRA detonated twenty-two bombs, all in a confined area in the Belfast city centre in July 1972, killing nine people, on what became known as "Bloody Friday". Ten days later, British security forces carried out Operation Motorman which aimed to re-take no-go areas in Belfast and Derry.

The general decline in European manufacturing of the early 1980s, exacerbated by political violence, devastated the city's economy. In May 1981, Bobby Sands, a native of Dunmurry in Greater Belfast, was the first of ten Republican prisoners to die on hunger strike in pursuit of political status. The event provoked major rioting in nationalist areas of the city. Compelled by civic strife, failed government initiatives and the Christian principle of peacemaking, Catholic priests Father Alec Reid and Father Gerry Reynolds of Clonard Monastery decided to attempt a grassroots peace process. Realising that many of the relevant leaders would lose the support of their constituencies were it known that they were negotiating, the would-be peace process was kept secret. Clandestine meetings were arranged in a side room of Clonard between John Hume (representing the SDLP and more moderate nationalists) and Gerry Adams speaking for Sinn Féin and the more extreme Republican movement. When terms were agreed on the Catholic side, Protestant leaders were invited into the talks. Not being comfortable meeting in a Catholic institution, unionist and loyalist leaders met with Reid and Reynolds in a private home in a mixed area on the Springfield Road. The secret peace talks were unknowingly threatened during a series of notorious incidents that took place within two weeks in 1988. First, three IRA members were killed in Gibraltar by the SAS in what republicans termed an assassination. Their remains were returned to Belfast, where the funeral for the slain IRA members was attacked by loyalist Michael Stone. (see Milltown Cemetery attack) The following week at the funerals of Stone's victims, two off-duty soldiers were lynched in the "corporals killings". Father Alec Reid was photographed administering last rites before unsuccessfully pleading with a gunman to spare their lives. However, instead of derailing the peace talks, these events added extra fervor for leaders to seek reconciliation, culminating in the ceasefires of 1994 and the ultimate peace deal of the Good Friday Agreement of 1998.

In the early 1990s, loyalist and republican paramilitaries in the city stepped up their killings of each other and "enemy" civilians. A cycle of killing continued right up to the PIRA ceasefire in August 1994 and the Combined Loyalist Military Command cessation six weeks later. The most horrific single attack of this period came in October 1993, when the PIRA bombed a fish shop on the Shankill Road in an attempt to kill the UDA leadership. The Shankill Road bombing instead killed nine Protestant shoppers as well as one of the bombers.

Despite the ceasefires of 1994, the city remains scarred by the conflict between the two communities. In all, nearly 1,500 people died in political violence in the city from 1969 on. Most of Belfast is highly segregated. Enclaves of one community surrounded by another (e.g., the Protestant Glenbryn estate in North Belfast, and the Catholic Short Strand in east Belfast) feel under siege. Fitful paramilitary activity continued, often directed inwards as in the loyalist feuds and the killing of Catholic Robert McCartney by PIRA members in December 2004.

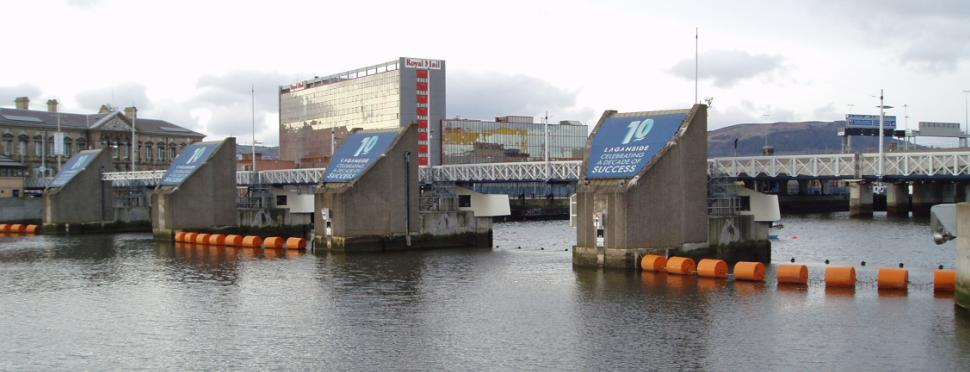
The Lagan Weir, a major catalyst for the redevelopment of the Laganside area and increasing use of the river throughout the city

In 1997, unionists lost control of the Belfast City Council for the first time in its history, with the Alliance Party of Northern Ireland gaining the balance of power between nationalists and unionists. This position was confirmed in the council elections of 2001 and 2005. Since then it has had two Catholic mayors, one from the Social Democratic and Labour Party (SDLP) and one from Sinn Féin.

== 21st Century Belfast ==
The formation of the Laganside Corporation in 1989 heralded the start of the regeneration of the River Lagan and the surrounding areas while other transformed areas include the Cathedral Quarter and the Victoria Square area. However segregation continues, with occasional low-level street violence in isolated flashpoints, and the construction of new Peace Lines.

However, since the Good Friday Agreement in 1998, there has been major redevelopment in the city including Victoria Square, the Titanic Quarter and Laganside as well as the Odyssey complex and the landmark Waterfront Hall.

In 2012 protests and riots broke out by disillusioned unionists following a change of law about the Union Jack flown on the City Hall.

On 28 August 2018, the newer refurbished Bank Buildings, site of a large Primark store in Belfast city centre, caught fire and burned for three days. One theory as to how conflagration began was that a worker accidentally left a blow torch ignited on the roof. The wind subsequently knocked the torch on its side causing the fire. An invest of £100 million was secured to painstakingly rebuild the historic, listed building. The structure was digitally mapped and carefully disassembled and stored in on-site shipping containers. Each salvageable brick was labelled and reused as the building was restored. Any piece that was too badly damaged was replaced with the closest material to the original. Primark Bank Buildings was re-opened on 1 November 2022 to much fanfare and was staff by 500 workers, 300 of which were new jobs.

In 2021, sporadic rioting broke out in pockets of Belfast and elsewhere in relation to the Northern Ireland Protocol, a by-product of Brexit. Some Loyalist influencers, fearing that Northern Ireland would receive different treatment than that of Britain when it came to trade, encouraged area youths to riot, a demonstration of their ability to disturb the peace. Influencers in Republicans responded in kind with their young people be pressured to also riot. In areas like West Belfast, Loyalist and Republican-based youths were separated by the Peace Wall and contained by police lines with officers in riot gear. On the Springfield Road, water cannons were deployed and eventually used to disperse the agitants (the first time a water cannon had been used in 6 years). Unrest dissipated with Loyalists calling an end to the uproar on their side out of respect to the Royal Family regarding the death of Prince Philip. Duke of Edinburgh.

In May 2023, Sinn Féin won a victory in the NI Assembly elections with Michelle O'Neill taking the post of First Minister. This was the first time a Nationalist party was the largest in a Northern Ireland election. The DUP would go on to refuse to form a government with Sinn Féin as part of their Stormont Boycott as a protest over the Northern Ireland Protocol.

On 18 January 2024, over 100,000 workers from the National Health Service, Translink NI and teachers' unions stage the Public Sector Strike over pay in many towns and cities including Belfast. After two years of suspension, the NI Assembly meet on 3 February 2024 and appoint Michelle O'Neill as First Minister and Emma Little-Pengelly as Deputy First minister. This is the first time in the history of Northern Ireland that a republican has become First Minister as well as the top two posts both being held by women.

== See also ==
- Timeline of Belfast history
