= George Crolly =

George Crolly (1813–1878) was an Irish priest and theologian. George Crolly was born in Lough Faughan, Ballyrolly, Downpatrick, County Down, Ireland, on 11 February 1813. He entered Maynooth College in August 1829 to study for the priesthood. A fellow student at the time was his friend and fellow theologian Rev. Dr. Patrick Murray.

He was ordained in 1837 and became a parish priest in Belfast. Dr Crolly was appointed Professor of Theology at Maynooth in 1843. In 1839 he assisted Charles Gavan Duffy and other Catholics in Belfast to establish The Vindicator newspaper to which he contributed, the paper supported the Daniel O'Connell and catholic emancipation. Crolly published a number of volumes on Moral Theology and a biography of his uncle Archbishop William Crolly.

Crolly died on 24 January 1878 and is buried in Maynooth College graveyard.
