= The Vindicator (Ulster newspaper) =

Catholic paper in Belfast (1839–1852)

- Type: Bi-weekly newspaper Weekly newspaper
- Founded: May 1839
- Ceased publication: 1852
- Headquarters: Belfast

The Vindicator was an Ulster Catholic newspaper published from 1839 to 1852 in Belfast. From 1847 it was also known as the Weekly Vindicator.

== History ==
The newspaper was founded in May 1839 by a group of Roman Catholics in Belfast, including Charles Gavan Duffy and Rev. Dr. George Crolly. The paper was published twice weekly on Wednesdays and Saturdays. It was originally based at 10 Ann Street, and later in 20 Rosemary Street, both in Belfast.

The newspaper supported Daniel O'Connell's repeal movement, and he was asked to nominate an editor. O'Connell proposed T.M. Hughes, but when he declined, Duffy was appointed to the role. In 1842 Duffy was prosecuted for libel, and left the paper to launch The Nation in Dublin. He was succeeded as editor by Kevin T. Buggy (1817–1843), who died in August 1843 and was in turn succeeded by C.D. Fitzgerald, who edited the paper until 1846.

The paper ceased bi-weekly publication in September 1848. It later moved to a weekly release schedule, and was sometimes called The Weekly Vindicator in that period. However, it ceased publication later in 1952.

Contributors to The Vindicator included James Clarence Mangan, Thomas Murray Hughes, and in later years Thomas MacNevin.
