= Robert Kane =

Robert Kane may refer to:

- Bob Kane (born Robert Kahn, 1915–1998), co-creator of Batman
- Rob Kane (1967–2021), American politician in Connecticut
- Robert Kane (born 1954), British musician with Dr. Feelgood
- Robert Kane (chemist) (1809–1890), Irish chemist
- Robert Kane (producer) (1886–1957), American film producer (Blood and Sand)
- Robert Kane (philosopher) (1938–2024), American philosopher
- Robert Kane (sports administrator) (1911–1992), president of the United States Olympic Committee
- Robert F. Kane (1926–2007), U.S. Ambassador to Ireland, 1984–1985
- Robert Romney Kane (1842–1902), Irish barrister and legal writer
- Bobby Kane, Scottish boxer

== See also ==
- Robert Cain (disambiguation)
- Robert Cane (1807–1858), Irish editor
