= William Kirby Sullivan =

Irish chemist, philologist, nationalist

William Kirby Sullivan (1822–1890) was an Irish philologist, chemist, historian, Irish nationalist, educationalist and a passionate promoter of Irish industrial development. He was most notable for his scholarship promoting the literary history and culture of Ireland. He was widely referenced by researchers such as scientist William Grove, jurist and historian Henry Maine and ethnographer and historian Jeremiah Curtin, who visited him in his Irish sojourn of 1887.

== Biography ==
He was born in Dripsey, County Cork, Ireland. His father, James Bartholomew Sullivan, owned a paper mill there employing about 400 people. He escaped a fire allegedly started by workers disaffected with the introduction of labour-saving machinery. Sullivan studied at the Christian Brothers school in Cork city. His first lectures were at the Cork Mechanics' Institute, Cork Street. Thereafter he went to Germany, where he studied at the University of Giessen under the pioneering chemist Justus von Liebig.

He returned to Ireland about 1844 with a Ph.D., and after heading to Dublin was appointed as assistant to Robert Kane (who had also worked with Liebig), Director of the Museum of Economic Geology. He performed investigations and analyses for Government projects such as the Geological Survey and helped to arrange extensive collections. He taught private students there and was on the council of the Royal Agricultural Improvement Society of Ireland. He showed a very broad scientific foundation in his writing, with subjects as diverse as electromagnetism (as referenced by William Grove) and geology, his interest in the latter being particularly deep: he accompanied British geologist Joseph Jukes on field expeditions and wrote a chapter in Jukes's Student's Manual of Geology. His first-known scientific paper was for the Philosophical Magazine (July, 1845) describing his discovery of a more sensitive method for the detection of mineralised phosphoric acid. With Kane, he wrote on the usage of turf (for paper, charcoal and industrial gases) and beetroot and performed research on varieties of "Swedish turnips" ("swedes" to the Irish, of a variety now known as sugar beet) as a potential sugar-crop. He built a model sugar-production plant in the basement of the Museum. In 1846, he became the Museum's official chemist; this position was terminated after two years after his criticism of the Society's poor choice of crops for his experiment, but his work continued and was part of the National Exhibition of 1852. He penned articles for The Dublin Quarterly Journal of Medical Science (founded by Kane). He founded and edited The Journal of Progress in 1851, containing articles on the application of science for the development of Irish industry, including contributions from Kane. He authored a report on the National Exhibition in John Maguire's The Industrial Movement in Ireland (1853). In 1854, he was appointed Professor of Chemistry of two different departments, one role specifically for popular lectures. He lectured at the Glasnevin Model Farm, Dublin, (see Albert College (Dublin)) and (later) helped to create the Munster Dairy Farm.

He was a member of Young Ireland and a shareholder in the short-lived nationalist newspaper of 1848, The Irish Tribune, founded by three medical students, which was regarded as a successor to John Mitchel's The United Irishman, and which was similarly suppressed by the government and its founders arrested. However, he did not participate in the Young Irelander Rebellion of 1848 as he was suffering from a long illness due to rheumatic fever, which had the life-long effect of weakening his heart. About 1849, he married Frances Hennessy, sister to his future professorial colleague the physicist Henry Hennessy.

When the prominent theologian John Newman became Rector of the Catholic University of Ireland at the invitation of Archbishop Cullen for the Irish bishops in 1854, he appointed Sullivan as Professor of Chemistry in 1856, and in time Dean of Science and Dean of Medicine. He remained Professor of Theoretical Chemistry at the Museum. Cullen was upset that Young Irelanders like Sullivan and his professorial colleague, the great Irish scholar Eugene O'Curry, were appointed by Newman, but Newman wholeheartedly accepted Sullivan's enthusiastic advice on the establishment's development. In 1857, Sullivan read various papers on chemistry at the meeting of British Association, which met in Dublin: through this he received grants to research high-temperature salt solutions. That year, he was elected to the Royal Irish Academy. When Kane became President of Queen's College, Cork, (now University College, Cork) Sullivan became Professor of Theoretical Chemistry at the new Royal College of Science in 1867. Sullivan was invited to succeeded Kane as the second President of Queen's College in 1873, a position he held until 1890. During his tenure, which was a residential post (Kane's presidency was largely in absentia), he engaged wide support and instigated major changes: the library, museum and botanical gardens were added to (including a glass house), a physics laboratory and engineering workshops were opened, the Medical (Windle) Building was completed (1875), the (William) Crawford Observatory was built with funds from the eponymous benefactor (1880) and female students were first admitted (1885). The wages of University employees were increased and he opened the grounds to the public. He was awarded a D.Sc. by the Royal University of Ireland in 1882 (Kane was the university's chancellor). He was the (Life-)President of the Cork Literary and Scientific Society, and was a key promoter of the Cork Exhibition of 1883, writing the official report of it. He invited nationalist politician Charles Stewart Parnell to meet his University colleagues.

From the 1850s, he wrote extensively on industry and education, including annual reports on the latter, bemoaning the state of secondary education, particularly in his native Munster. His experience is shown in evidence he gave to the House of Commons Select Committee on Scientific Institutions in Dublin (1864), the Royal Commission on Technical Instruction (1883), and the Select Committee on Irish Industries (1885). He recalled his successful experiments with sugar-beet, a crop which remained undeveloped in Ireland [but which had expanded greatly in other countries such as France and Germany].

Sullivan was the editor of Atlantis, a Catholic University science journal with a literary section (begun in 1858 by Newman), and was a vice-president of the Ossianic Society, an Irish literary society named after the legendary Irish poet Oisín. His interest in philology, according to his close friend Denny Lane, began earnestly in Germany. He did articles for the Encyclopædia Britannica, on the Celts for example, and other publications. As well as his scientific articles concerning plant chemistry and agriculture, in 1858-9, he completed a 100-page article in Atlantis, On the influence which the Physical Geography, the Animal and Vegetable Productions, etc. of different regions exert upon the Languages, Mythology, and early Literature of Mankind, with reference to its employment as a test of Ethnological Hypotheses. In 1863, he published as a book his extended translations of a selection of the works of the German philologist and expert on Irish and British language origins, Hermann Ebel, from Beiträge zur vergleichenden Sprachforschung [Contributions to comparative language research], which he'd contributed to Atlantis. In 1866, having been a council member for four years, he became a vice-president of the Royal Irish Academy and secretary from 1867–74. He translated and edited the posthumously-published lecture series of his former colleague, O'Curry, On the manners and customs of the ancient Irish. This necessitated a long introduction and appendices for the series, encompassing the whole initial volume, and became his most celebrated work, a key reference book in itself: Henry Maine, for example, quotes extensively and Jeremiah Curtin visited him for a few days in 1887. Along with the future British ambassador to the U.S.A, James Bryce, and Richard Barry O'Brien, he was an editor of Two Centuries of Irish History (1888); he wrote the section covering the years from the Treaty of Limerick (1691 -1782) entitled The Ireland of the Penal Days with his friend, the poet and political journalist George Sigerson. Considering his translations, there has been some dispute about how he gained his expertise in Irish and other languages, save for German (Irish was widely spoken around his birthplace).

He was diagnosed with heart disease in 1887 and began sleeping in his office. His wife, Frances, died the following year and he succumbed to his condition on 12 May 1890, survived by three sons and two daughters. He is buried in St. Finbarr's Graveyard, Cork. A memorial in the form of a celtic cross was installed on his grave, and the remainder of the public money collected for such was donated to the Munster Dairy School.
