= Katherine Sophia Kane =

Irish botanist

Lady Katherine Sophia Kane
- Born: Katherine Sophia Baily; 11 March 1811
- Died: 25 February 1886 (aged 74); Dublin, Ireland
- Known for: The Irish Flora (1833)
- Scientific career
- Fields: Botany

Lady Katherine Sophia Kane (née Baily; 11 March 1811 – 25 February 1886) was an Irish botanist, best known for her book on Irish flowering plants The Irish Flora (1833).

== Life ==
Katherine Sophia Baily was born 11 March 1811, the only child of Henry and Bridget Baily (née O'Kelly). Her father was from Berkshire, England, and he moved around Ireland for his work as a distiller. Her uncle was the astronomer and vice-president of the Royal Society, Francis Baily. After the deaths of both her parents at a young age, Katherine was raised by her uncle Matthias O'Kelly of Rochestown House, Killiney, County Dublin. Matthias had an interest in natural history as one of his own sons, Joseph O'Kelly, went on to become a geologist.

Katherine married Robert Kane in 1838. It is believed that she met Robert Kane after the proof of The Irish Flora was sent to him in error. When her husband was elected President of the newly formed Queen's College Cork, Lady Kane refused to move there, preferring to stay in Dublin, tending to her collection of exotic plants.

The Kanes had seven surviving children, including Robert Romney Kane and Henry Coey Kane. She died 25 February 1886 in Dublin.

== Botanical work ==
The 1833 Linnean botanical work The Irish Flora, which was published anonymously, is ascribed to her. Katherine was aged 22 at the time of its first publication and although not a large work, it was one of the first of its kind, and lauded for its accuracy. The book became the recommended botany text in Trinity College, Dublin as it contained the first record of many plants. It is believed John White, of the Irish Botanic Gardens, helped with the compilation of the work, and that it was Dr. Walter Wade who encouraged her in this work. In 1836, the then 25-year-old Katherine became the first woman to be elected member of the Botanical Society of Edinburgh, and her herbarium is housed in University College Cork. She had an interest in the cultivation of trees, writing about the subject for the Irish Farmer's and Gardener's Magazine. The standard author abbreviation Kane is used to indicate this person as the author when citing a botanical name.
