= Thomas Antisell =

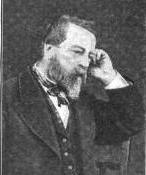
- Born: 16 January 1817; Dublin, Ireland
- Died: 14 June 1893 (aged 76); Washington, D.C., United States
- Known for: physician, chemist, and geologist
- Spouses: Eliza Ann Nowlan (m. 1841) Marion Stuart Forsyth (m. 1854)

Thomas Antisell (16 January 1817 – 14 June 1893) was a physician, scientist, professor, and Young Irelander. He fought in the American Civil War, and served as an advisor to the Japanese Meiji government.

== Early life and education ==
Antisell was born in Dublin, 16 January 1817, the youngest son of Thomas Christopher Antisell KC (home circuit) and Margaret (née) Daly. Antisell attended the Dublin School of Medicine, the Apothecaries' Hall of Ireland, and the Royal College of Surgeons in London, graduating from the latter with an MD in November 1839. He studied chemistry in Paris and Berlin in 1844. Upon his return to Dublin in 1845, he secured a lectureship in botany at the Peter St. School of Medicine, teaching there until 1848. After this, he opened a clinic at his residence of 25 Richmond Street, Portobello. Antisell worked as an assistant to Robert Kane, and between 1845 and 1847, produced textbooks on Irish geology and chemistry. He became a member of the Royal Dublin Society in 1844.

Antisell was a member of the Young Ireland movement of the 1840s, and joined the Irish Confederation in 1847. With a group of five friends in the republican movement, including Richard D'Alton Williams and Kevin O'Doherty, Antisell set up a short-lived revolutionary newspaper, The Irish Tribune, in June 1848 to take the place of the suppressed United Irishman, founded by John Mitchel. The paper was closed down on the grounds of sedition in July 1848 after just five issues. Following the closure of the paper, Antisell emigrated to the United States, arriving in New York on 22 November 1848. Some sources claim this departure was to evade arrest or charges relating to sedition. Although he was no longer politically active following his departure from Ireland, he was a close friend of the John Mitchel and his family. Antisell married his first wife, Eliza Ann Nowlan, in 1841. Eliza died shortly after their arrival in America.

== Emigration to the United States ==
Antisell set up and operated a clinic and medical laboratory in New York city from 1848 to 1854, whilst also lecturing in chemistry in a number of medical colleges in Massachusetts and Vermont. He took up a post as expedition geologist and botanist on state surveys in southern Arizona, New Mexico, and California, working primarily with Lt John G. Parke investigating the proposed routes for the Southern Pacific railroad from 1854 to 1856. His work on the geology of the region added to greater understanding of the science in America. In 1856, Antisell was employed as chief examiner in the US Patent Office in Washington, D.C., with responsibility for chemical inventions. This work allowed him to also lecture in chemistry at Georgetown University, Washington, eventually covering other subjects such as toxicology, military surgery, physiology, hygiene, and pathology, over the periods 1858 to 1869, and 1880 to 1882.

Breaking with Mitchel who, as defender of slavery, supported the southern secessionist cause, Antisell served in the Union Army during the American Civil War. He was fa brigade surgeon in the US Volunteers from 1861, and later the medical director of the 12th army corps. He concluded his service as surgeon-in-charge of Harewood hospital, Washington in October 1865, being granted a brevet commission as colonel. From 1866 to 1871, he was chief chemist in the US Department of Agriculture. Antisell married his second wife, Marion Stuart Forsyth from Detroit, in 1854. They went on to have twelve children, six daughters and six sons.

In 1848, he was Professor of Chemistry at Berkshire Medical College. 1854 saw him as Professor of Chemistry at the Medical College at Woodstock, Vermont. From 1869 to 1870 he was Professor of Chemistry at Maryland Agricultural College.

== Work in Japan ==
Antisell was one of several scientists that were hired in 1871 as foreign advisors to work in Hokkaido in northern Japan under Horace Capron. He was selected for his strong background in chemistry coupled with geology. However, he disagreed with Capron on whether or not Hokkaido's severe winter climate would hinder development, and he also came into conflict with the Japanese government over his salary. As a result, Hokkaido Colonisation Office hired another geologist, and Antisell's report excluded in the 1875 compilation of official reports. He served his remaining time in Japan as a chemist for the Ministry of Finance, where he developed inks used for the printing of paper currency. For his services, he was awarded the Order of the Rising Sun by Emperor Meiji before his departure in 1876.

== Later life ==
Upon returning to the United States, Antisell was conferred with a PhD in 1876 by Georgetown University, and once again took up duties at the Patent Office, remaining there until his retirement. Antisell published widely in numerous journals on topics such as agricultural chemistry, botany, oceanography, city sanitation, and animal disease, but he did not publish a significant treatise. He died in Washington on 14 June 1893, and is buried in the Congressional Cemetery.

== Works by Antisell ==
- A manual of agricultural chemistry, with its application to the soils of Ireland (1845)
- Irish geology, in a series of chapters, containing an outline of the science of geology (1846)
- Suggestions towards the improvement of the sanitary condition of the metropolis (1847)
- Home cyclopedia of the arts and manufactures (1852)
- "Geological reconnaissance of southern California and Arizona", United States: explorations and surveys, vii (1856)
- "Synoptical tables of botanical localities", John Torrey (ed.), Reports of explorations and surveys to ascertain the most practical and economical route for a railroad from the Mississippi river to the Pacific ocean (33rd Congress, 3rd session, ex. Doc., no. 91, vol. 7)
