= The Irish Felon =

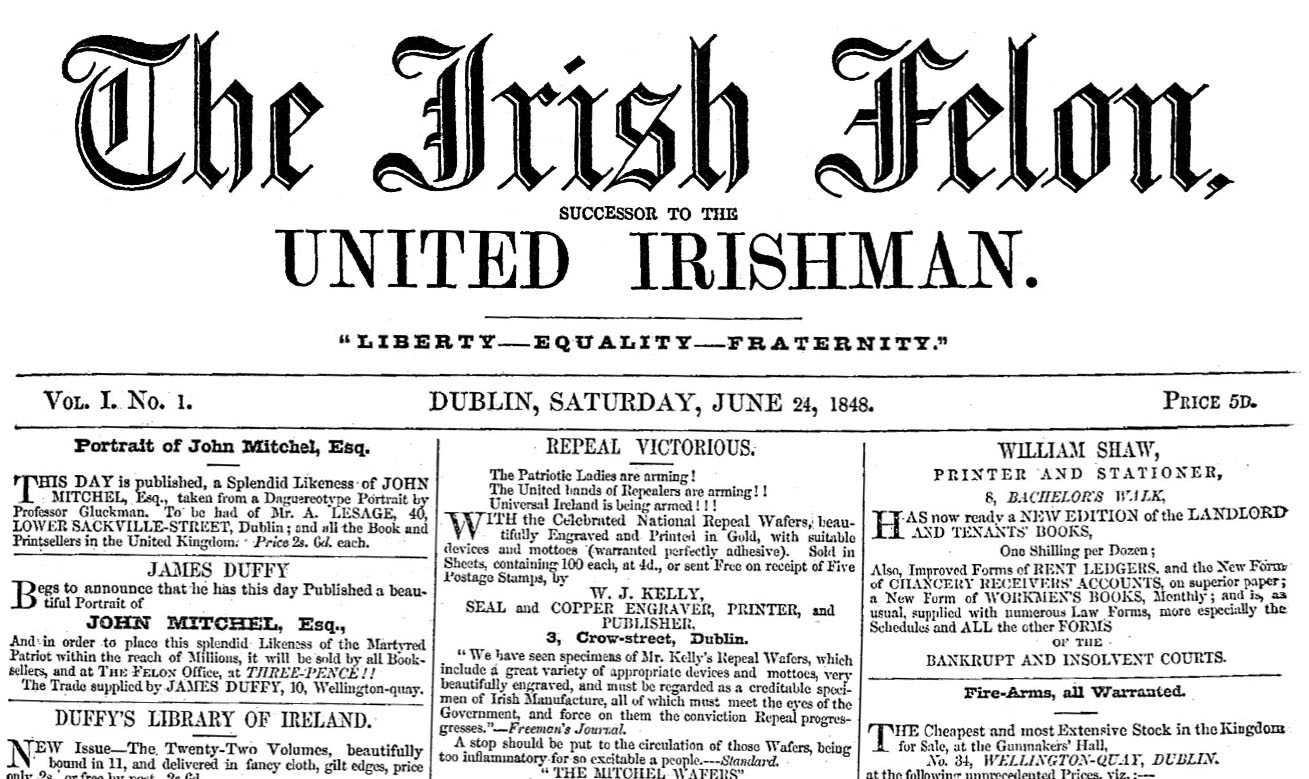
- Type: weekly newspaper
- Founded: 24 June 1848
- Political alignment: Irish nationalism
- Language: English
- Headquarters: Dublin

The Irish Felon was a nationalist weekly journal printed in Dublin in 1848. Only five issues were published before its suppression by the British Government.

== History ==
The United Irishman was a republican journal printed and published by John Mitchel from February 1848. Mitchel had written for The Nation, which supported Daniel O'Connell's Repeal Association, but resigned to create his more radical paper, advocating sedition. Another member of Young Ireland, John Martin, contributed to Mitchel's paper. Mitchel was arrested, initially charged with sedition but was then charged with the new crime of treason felony and on 21 May was sentenced to 14 years in Van Diemen's Land.

Martin aimed to carry on Mitchel's political message. The gap for a more radical publication was first filled by The Irish Tribune, which appeared on 10 June and contained a memoir of Mitchel, however the first issue also contained an advertisement for Martin's new journal with a claim that it was the "successor to the United Irishman" and would be assisted by two other Young Irelanders, Thomas Devin Reilly and James Fintan Lalor. It was also stated that the journal would be "selected and compiled in the same manner as the United Irishman" and that "subscribers to the United Irishman will be supplied with "The Irish Felon" to the expiration of their respective Terms of Subscription." The Irish Felon duly appeared on 24 June. Martin also established The Felon Club, one of many nationalist clubs. Reilly had previously provided articles for the United Irishman and Lalor had been a regular contributor to The Nation. Articles continued to cover the revolutionary unrest in Europe of the period. Martin, like Mitchel, printed and published the paper himself from the same address, 12 Trinity Street.

Members of the House of Commons and the House of Lords debated concerns about the famine, failed prosecutions for sedition, so-called "monster meetings" and Irish revolutionary opinion in general, including its effect on Great Britain. The Crown and Government Security Bill had gone from its first reading to law in the month of April, mentioning Mitchel and resulting in the Act of Parliament under which he had been charged. A seditious article of Lalor's from The Irish Felon was quoted on 22 July by the prime minister, John Russell, who additionally referred to The Nation. Lalor was quoted by the Marquess of Lansdowne and Baron Kerry, Henry Petty-FitzMaurice, two days later in the House of Lords, after which the Habeas Corpus Suspension (Ireland) Bill was passed. Martin had handed himself in on 8 July 1848 after a warrant was issued for his arrest. Kevin Izod O'Doherty and Richard D'Alton Williams, two proprietors of The Irish Tribune, were arrested two days later. The press was stopped and the type and press seized on 28 July and future publication suspended.

Martin was charged with treason felony. Lalor wrote to the Under-Secretary saying that he had written the articles which had been used as evidence against Martin. His appeal was rejected and he himself was arrested. Martin was given a 10-year sentence in Van Diemen's Land on 18 August. Lalor suffered from ill health in prison and was released some months later. He died the following year from bronchitis. Reilly escaped arrest and fled to the US.
