= Robert Cain =

Robert Cain may refer to:

- Robert Cain (brewer) (1826–1907), founder of Cains Brewery in Liverpool, England
- Robert Henry Cain (1909–1974), Victoria Cross recipient
- Bob Cain (1924–1997), Major League Baseball pitcher
- Bob Cain (footballer) (1866–?), Scottish footballer
- Bob Cain (reporter) (1934–2014), American news anchor
- Bobby Cain (1931–2012) American racing driver
- a pseudonym used by writer William H. Keith Jr.

== See also ==
- Robert Cane (1807–1858), Irish editor
- Robert Kane (disambiguation)
