= George Robert Stephenson =

British civil engineer

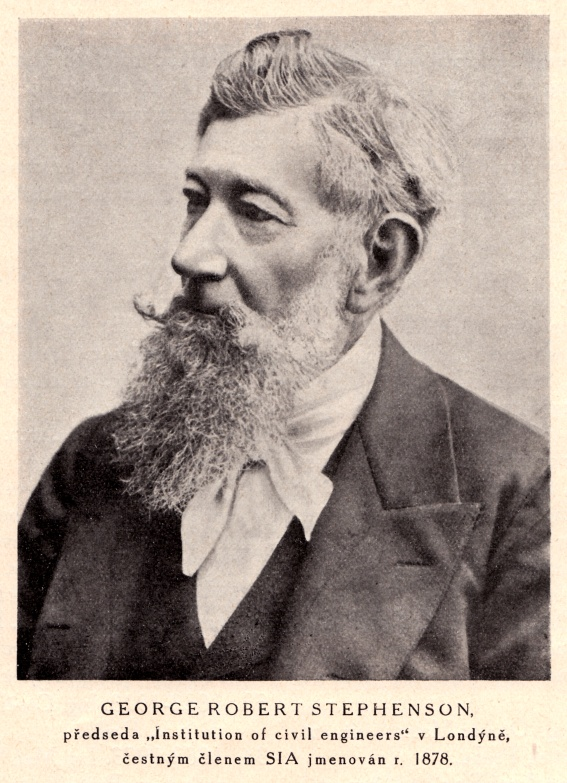
- "George Robert Stephenson, President of the Institution of Civil Engineers in London, honorary member of the Society of Czech Engineers since 1878"
- Born: 20 October 1819; Newcastle upon Tyne, Northumberland
- Died: 26 October 1905 (aged 86); Cheltenham, Gloucestershire
- Engineering career
- Discipline: Civil
- Institutions: Institution of Civil Engineers (president)
- Practice name: Robert Stephenson and Company

George Robert Stephenson (20 October 1819 – 26 October 1905) was a British civil engineer.

== Life ==
Stephenson was born to Robert Stephenson Senior (brother of the famed George Stephenson) in Newcastle upon Tyne. In a family of civil engineers, his father was engineer of Pendleton Colliery and Nantlle Railway, while his uncle George Stephenson and cousin Robert Stephenson were prolific railway engineers. He was educated at King William's College, Isle of Man. It was with Robert that he collaborated most, working together on the South Eastern Railway. Upon Robert's death in 1859 he took over his locomotive works and several collieries.

In the 1860s, Stephenson travelled to New Zealand to supervise the survey and arrangements for the construction of a railway from Christchurch, through Mount Pleasant to Lyttelton Harbour. The Lyttelton rail tunnel is still in use today as the country's oldest operational rail tunnel. Stephenson enjoyed a long association with the country, for which he designed several other works in the mid-nineteenth century.

He is perhaps most famous for his close relationship with the Institution of Civil Engineers. He became a member in 1853 and was elected to the council in 1859. The expansion of the Institution's premises in 1868 was made possible by his donation of land to the rear of his offices at 24 Great George Street. He served as president of the Institution between December 1875 and December 1877.

He married Jane Brown in 1846 and had six children. After Jane died in 1884 he soon remarried to Sarah Harrison who died in 1893.

He died at his home in Cheltenham on 26 October 1905.

== Honours ==
- 1880: Knight in the Order of Leopold.

Professional and academic associations
Preceded by Thomas Elliot Harrison	President of the Institution of Civil Engineers; December 1875 – December 1877	Succeeded by John Frederick Bateman
