= Alexander George Richey =

Irish barrister and historian

Alexander George Richey (1830–1883) was an Irish barrister and historian.

== Life ==
He was the son of Alexander Richey of Mountemple, Coolock, County Dublin, and his wife, Matilda Browne, whose sister Margaret married Henry Caulfeild, father of the 3rd Earl of Charlemont. He was educated at Dungannon Royal School, entered Trinity College, Dublin, in 1848, and was elected on the foundation in 1861. He graduated B.A. in 1853, winning the first gold medal in classics, LL.B. in 1855, and LL.D. in 1873.

Richey was called to the Irish bar in 1855, and took silk in 1871. In 1871 he was appointed deputy Regius Professor of Feudal and English Law at Trinity College; he was also vice-president of the Royal Irish Academy, and an auditor and prizeman of the College Historical Society. He died at his residence, 27 Upper Pembroke Street, Dublin, on 29 November 1883, and was buried on 3 December in Mount Jerome cemetery.

== Works ==
Richey was author of:

- Lectures on the History of Ireland; two series, 1869, 1870; the first was a course delivered at Alexandra College, Dublin, and covered the history of Ireland down to 1534; the second was delivered at Trinity College and went as far as the plantation of Ulster. These lectures, together with other lectures, were collected in A Short History of the Irish People, down to the Plantation of Ulster (1887), edited, after Richey's death, by Robert Romney Kane, with one chapter of a detailed history of Ireland.
- The Irish Land Laws, 1880. It was quoted as an authority by William Ewart Gladstone in the debates on his Land Bill of 1881.

Richey also edited vols. iii. and iv. of the Brehon laws, published by the commissioners for publishing the ancient laws and institutes of Ireland, to which he contributed prefaces. He contributed frequently to The Athenæum and Saturday Review.

== Family ==
Richey married the elder daughter of Major-general Henry Smith of Bathboys, County Wicklow, who survived him with three sons and two daughters.

== Notes ==
Attribution

This article incorporates text from a publication now in the public domain: Lee, Sidney, ed. (1896). "Richey, Alexander George". Dictionary of National Biography. Vol. 48. London: Smith, Elder & Co.
