= List of fellows of the Royal Society elected in 1849 =

Fellows of the Royal Society elected in 1849.

== Fellows ==
1. John Couch Adams (1819–1892)
2. Thomas Andrews (1813–1885)
3. Francis Thornhill Baring (1796–1866)
4. Charles Barry (1795–1860)
5. Sir Benjamin Collins Brodie (1817–1880)
6. John Dalrymple (1803–1852)
7. James Glaisher (1809–1903)
8. Robert Alfred Cloyne Godwin-Austen (1808–1884)
9. Robert John Kane (1809–1890)
10. William Lassell (1799–1880)
11. James Prince Lee (1804–1869)
12. Henry Beaumont Leeson (1800–1872)
13. Thomas Babington Macaulay (1800–1859)
14. Andrew Crombie Ramsay (1814–1891)
15. John Scott Russell (1808–1882)
16. Francis Sibson (1814–1876)
17. Robert Stephenson (1803–1859) railway and civil engineer
18. Philip James Yorke (1799–1874)
