= The Irish Tribune =

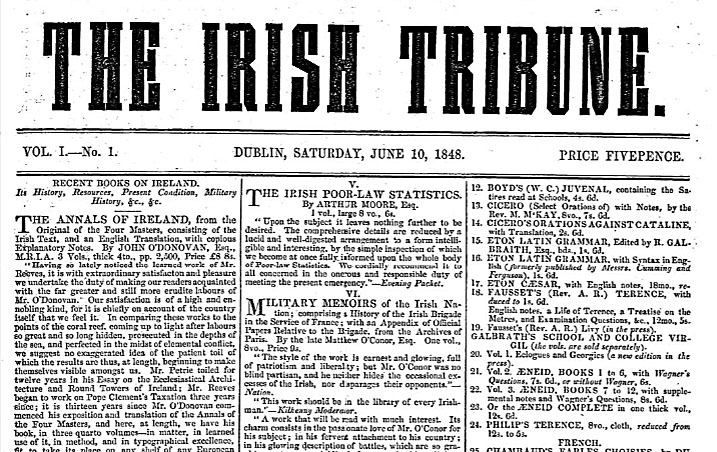
- Type: Weekly newspaper
- Founded: 10 June 1848
- Ceased publication: 8 July 1848
- Political alignment: Irish nationalism
- Language: English
- Headquarters: Dublin

The Irish Tribune was a short-lived nationalist newspaper printed weekly in Dublin in 1848. Five issues were published until its suppression by the British Government.

== History ==
It was founded during the atmosphere of the revolutions of 1848.The Nation was a nationalist newspaper supportive of Daniel O'Connell's Repeal Association. One of its writers, John Mitchel, resigned in 1847, wanting to engage in a more "vigorous policy against the English government". In February 1848, he published the United Irishman, promoting sedition. He was eventually charged with treason felony, a new amendment to the crime of high treason. On 21 May, he was sentenced to be transported to Van Diemen's Land for fourteen years.

Other Young Irelanders conspired to fill the gap left by Mitchel. For The Irish Tribune, the proprietors were scientist and physician, Thomas Antisell, who had a clinic, a lectureship in botany and was an assistant to the chemist Professor Robert Kane, and two medical students, Kevin O'Doherty and Richard Williams. It was published at 11 Trinity Street, Dublin, and printed by Denis Hoban. The first issue came out on 10 June 1848. Antisell helped with the funding (there were shareholders) and contributed articles. Williams' poetry had been published in The Nation and another contributor published in The Nation, John Savage, penned poems for the Tribune. The paper included a full-page memoir of John Mitchel, a republican manifesto, articles reporting on chartism the revolutionary fervour across Europe, and an advertisement for John Martin's imminent "successor" to The United Irishman, The Irish Felon. The Tribune itself was considered by many to be that successor, but in the second issue editors clarified this was not intended (orders for the Tribune had been sent to The United Irishman's office at 12 Trinity Street).

The fifth issue was the last to be published, on 8 July 1848. Members of the House of Commons and the House of Lords remained exercised by threats from Irish Confederates and events associated with the famine. The Government took the type and proofs of the sixth issue and suppressed future publication. O'Doherty and Williams were arrested on 10 July, along with Martin. [The Nation was suppressed and had its type removed on 28 July]. After two failed trials, O'Doherty was convicted of the same crime as Mitchel on 30 October and sentenced to transportation to Van Diemen's Land for ten years, as was Martin. Williams was acquitted on 1 September. Antisell was sentenced to exile and imprisonment, but escaped arrest as a friend helped to secure a post as a surgeon on a US-bound ship; he and others, including Savage, arrived there in November.
