= Robert Stephenson =

English civil and locomotive engineer (1803–1859)

Robert Stephenson FRS, HonFRSE, FRSA, DCL (Hon. causa)
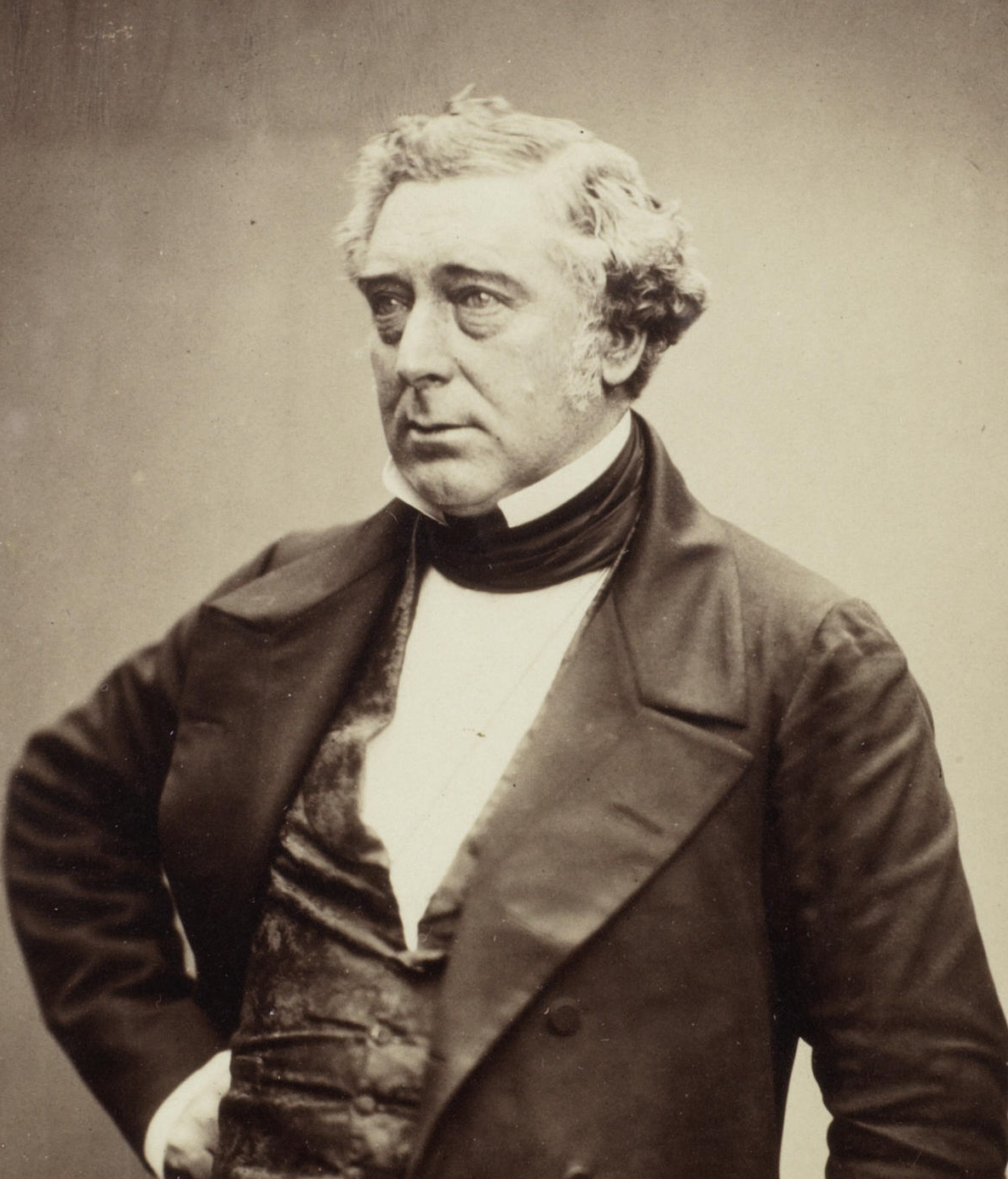
- Stephenson in 1856
- Born: 16 October 1803; Willington Quay, Northumberland, England
- Died: 12 October 1859 (aged 55); London, England
- Resting place: Westminster Abbey
- Education: University of Edinburgh
- Spouses: Frances Sanderson; (m. 1829–1842; her death)
- Parent: George Stephenson
- Relatives: George Robert Stephenson (cousin)
- Engineering career
- Projects: Rocket; London and Birmingham Railway; High Level Bridge; Royal Border Bridge; Britannia Bridge; Victoria Bridge (Montreal)
- Awards: Fellow of the Royal Society (1849); Knight of the Order of Leopold

Robert Stephenson (16 October 1803 – 12 October 1859) was an English civil engineer and designer of locomotives. The only son of George Stephenson, the "Father of Railways", he built on the achievements of his father.

Robert Stephenson became an apprentice under mining engineer Nicholas Wood after completing his education in 1819. In 1821, he and his father surveyed the Bishop Auckland area to help Edward Pease build a railway that would transport coal from the area to Darlington and Stockton-on-Tees. In 1823, the Stephensons and Pease founded Robert Stephenson and Company to manufacture locomotives; the company designed such locomotives as the Lancashire Witch in 1828 and the John Bull in 1831, the latter of which became the first steam locomotive to run in New Jersey.

Throughout the 1830s Robert oversaw the construction of several railways, including the Canterbury and Whitstable Railway, the Bolton & Leigh railway, the Warrington & Newton Railway and the Leicester and Swannington Railway. He drew the plans for the London and Birmingham Railway, which opened in 1838. In 1832 he was appointed surveyor for a project to build a railway between Lanehead Farmhouse and Consett in County Durham, but the railway line closed in 1840, six years after its completion. In 1839 he spent three months in France, Spain and Italy advising on railways, and after returning to England he advised Parliament and arbitrated in disputes between railway companies and contractors. He was made Knight of the Order of Leopold in 1841 for his improvements to locomotive engines.

In 1845 Robert designed an iron bridge that would cross the River Dee; the Dee bridge was completed in 1846 but collapsed under a locomotive, causing the deaths of five people. Robert was accused of manslaughter during the inquest, but a verdict of accidental death was ultimately returned. He also designed the Britannia Bridge, which crosses the Menai Strait and consists of four tubes; it was opened to public traffic in 1850. The High Level Bridge, another of his works, crosses the Tyne and was opened in 1849 by Queen Victoria. She offered Robert a knighthood, but he refused.

Robert, who was a member of the Conservative Party, was elected as the Member of Parliament for Whitby; he held the position until his death in 1859.

Robert has been called the greatest engineer of the 19th century. Stephenson's death was widely mourned, and his funeral afforded marks of public honour. He is buried in Westminster Abbey.

== Early life ==
Robert Stephenson was born on 16 October 1803, (Note: Robert and George both gave the month of Robert's birth variously as October, November or December. Jeaffreson & Pole (1864a, p. 7) states that although he celebrated his birthday on 16 November, the October date was determined by looking at an extract from the register. Most biographies, such as Rolt (1984, p. 10) and Davies (1975, p. 8), give this date of birth except Ross (2010, pp. 21, 288), who gives the November date because George Parker Bidder was invited by Robert to a birthday party on 16 November 1852, and Robert's birthday is noted in Bidder's diary in 1853, 1854 and 1875.) at Willington Quay, east of Newcastle upon Tyne, to George Stephenson and Frances (née Henderson), usually known as Fanny. She was twelve years older than George, and when they met she was working as a servant where George was lodging. After marrying, George and Fanny lived in an upper room of a cottage; George worked as a brakesman on the stationary winding engine on the Quay, and in his spare time he cleaned and mended clocks and repaired shoes.

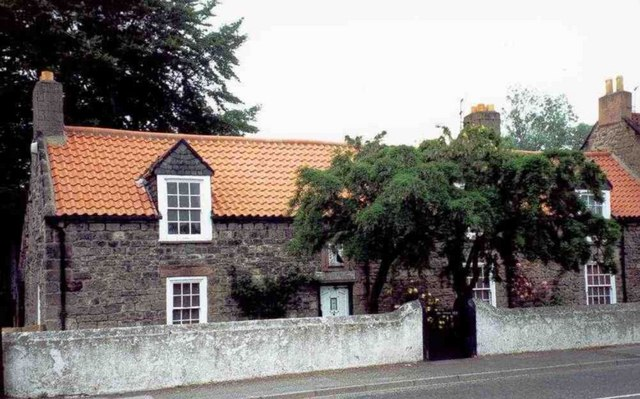
Dial Cottage, Killingworth, where Stephenson grew up. The sundial installed by Stephenson and his father can be seen above the front door.

In 1804, George became a brakesman at the West Moor Pit, and the family moved to Killingworth. Fanny's health deteriorated, and she died on 14 May 1806. Robert was first sent to a village school 1 1/2 miles (2.4 km) away in Long Benton. George had received little formal education but was determined that his son would have one and so sent the eleven-year-old Robert to be taught at the Percy Street Academy in Newcastle. Robert became a member of the Newcastle Literary and Philosophical Society and borrowed books for him and his father to read. In the evenings, he would work with his father on designs for steam engines. In 1816 they made a sundial together, which is still in place above the cottage door.

After leaving school in 1819, Stephenson was apprenticed to the mining engineer Nicholas Wood, manager of Killingworth colliery. As an apprentice Stephenson worked hard and lived frugally, and unable to afford to buy a mining compass, he made one that he would later use to survey the High Level Bridge in Newcastle.

== Personal life ==
In 1829, Stephenson married Frances Sanderson; the couple had no children, and he did not remarry after her death in 1842. In 1847, he was elected Member of Parliament for Whitby, and held the seat until his death. Stephenson declined a British knighthood, for unstated reasons, as his father had before him. (Note: George Stephenson had similarly declined a knighthood on two occasions. According to Smiles (1859), the senior Stephenson regarded such honours as mere flourishes, quoting him calling them "empty additions to my name". The Robert Stephenson Trust states Robert rejected the knighthood offered to him for "personal reasons". Jeaffreson and Pole (1846) explain his rejection of it this way: "The engineer had just declined the honour of knighthood ... He had reached a point of life and fame when such rank could afford him neither pleasure nor profit. If his wife had been still alive he might have decided otherwise.") He did accept several non-British honours: He was decorated in Belgium with the Knight of the Order of Leopold, in France with the Knight of the Legion of Honour and in Norway with the Knight Grand Cross of the order of St Olaf.

He was elected a Fellow of the Royal Society (FRS) in 1849. A later fellow of the society was Robert Stephenson Smyth Baden-Powell, who was Stephenson's godson and named after him. Stephenson also served as President of the Institution of Mechanical Engineers and of the Institution of Civil Engineers. Oxford University conferred an honorary Doctor of Civil Law degree on Stephenson.

== Early career ==
=== Stockton and Darlington Railway ===
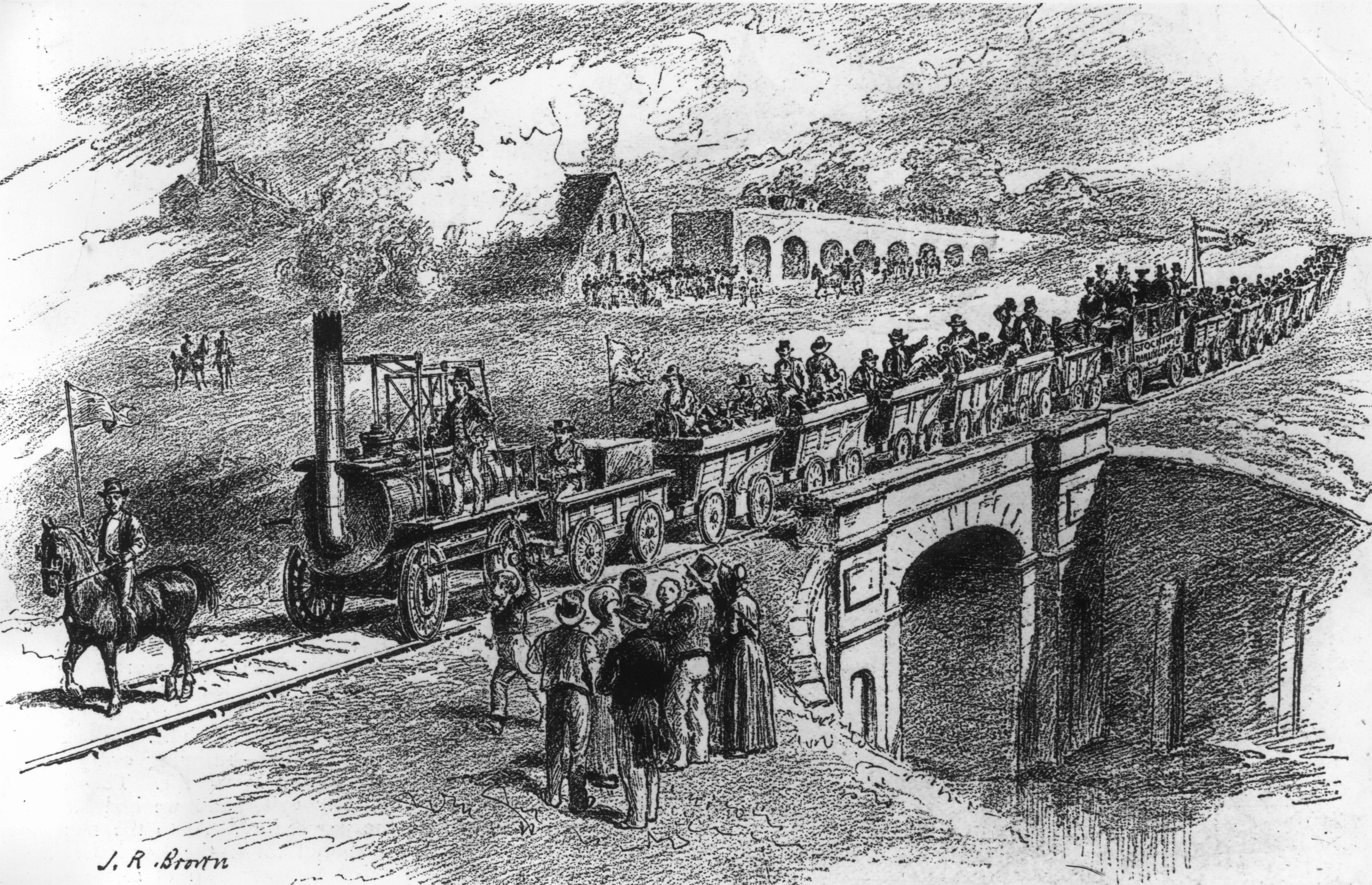
The opening of the Stockton and Darlington Railway in 1825

Ways were investigated in the early 19th century to transport coal from the mines in the Bishop Auckland area to Darlington and the quay at Stockton-on-Tees, and canals had been proposed. The Welsh engineer George Overton suggested a tramway, surveyed a route in September 1818 and the scheme was promoted by Edward Pease at a meeting in November. (Note: Pease was a Quaker and after approximately a third of the shares were bought by Quakers and Pease, his family and other local Quakers had control of the managing committee the railway became known as "the Quaker line".) A private bill for a Stockton and Darlington Railway (S&DR) was presented to Parliament in 1819 but was opposed by landowners and did not pass. The route was changed, Overton carried out another survey and an act of Parliament, the Stockton and Darlington Railway Act 1821 (1 & 2 Geo. 4. c. xliv), received royal assent on 19 April 1821; Pease and George Stephenson met for the first time in Darlington that same day, (Note: In Smiles' biography, George had travelled down with Wood to see Pease uninvited, but Wood later stated publicly that the meeting had been by appointment. However, notes probably dictated by an elderly George were published in 1973 that said he had travelled to Darlington to see Pease because of the advice of friends,) and by 23 July George had been appointed to make a fresh survey of the line.

Stephenson had not completed his apprenticeship, but he was showing symptoms of tuberculosis, and his work was hazardous; he was down West Moor Pit when there was an underground explosion. Wood agreed to release the 18-year-old so that he could assist his father during the survey. By the end of 1821 they reported that a usable line could be built within the bounds of the act of Parliament, but another route would be shorter and avoid deep cuttings and tunnels. George was elected engineer by shareholders with a salary of £660 per annum. He advocated the use of steam locomotives, Pease visited Killingworth in the summer of 1822, and the directors visited Hetton colliery railway, on which George had also introduced locomotives. During the survey of the S&DR George had been persuaded, mainly by the Scottish engineer Robert Bald, that Robert would benefit from a university education. George could have afforded to send his son to a full degree course at Cambridge but agreed to a short academic year as he wished that Robert should not become a gentleman but should work for his living. Robert first helped William James to survey the route of the Liverpool and Manchester Railway and then attended classes at Edinburgh University between October 1822 and April 1823.

On 23 May 1823, a second S&DR act of Parliament, the Stockton and Darlington Railway Act 1823 (4 Geo. 4. c. xxxiii), received royal assent with the Stephensons' deviations from the original route and permission for the use of "loco-motives or moveable engines". In June 1823 the Stephensons and Pease opened Robert Stephenson and Company at Forth Street in Newcastle to build these locomotives, Pease lending Robert £500 so he could buy his share. As George was busy supervising the building of the railway, Robert was placed in charge of the works with a salary of £200 per annum. Robert also surveyed the route and designed the Hagger Leases branch, which was planned to serve the collieries at Butterknowle and Copley Bent. A new act of Parliament was required for the line, and Robert stayed in London for five weeks while the bill passed through its parliamentary process, with royal assent being given to the Stockton and Darlington Railway Act 1824 (5 Geo. 4. c. xlviii) in May 1824. The S&DR ordered two steam locomotives and two stationary engines from Robert Stephenson & Co. on 16 September 1824, and the railway opened on 27 September 1825.

=== Colombian mines ===
On 18 June 1824, Stephenson sailed on the Sir William Congreve from Liverpool for South America with a contract for three years. At that time Colombia and Venezuela had not been independent of Spain for long, and they were both part of the same republic, Gran Colombia. The area's natural resources were attracting some British investors, including the Colombian Mining Association which had been formed to reopen gold and silver mines worked by the Spanish in colonial times. A Robert Stephenson & Co. partner, Thomas Richardson, was a promoter. Robert Stephenson & Co. received orders for steam engines from the company, and Richardson suggested to Stephenson that he go to South America.

To prepare for the trip, Stephenson took Spanish lessons, visited mines in Cornwall, and consulted a doctor, who advised that such a change of climate would be beneficial to his health. After a five-week journey Robert arrived at the port of La Guayra in Venezuela on 23 July 1824. He investigated building a breakwater and pier at the harbour, and a railway to Caracas. A railway linking Caracas to its port was an ambitious project as Caracas is nearly 1,000 meters above sea level: one was not completed until the 1880s. Stephenson had potential backers for his railway in London, but he concluded that while the cost of a pier, estimated at £6,000, would be sustainable, that of a breakwater or railway would not.

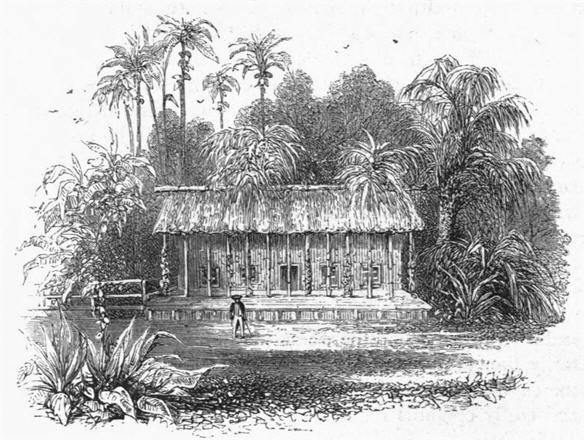
Stephenson's cottage at Santa Ana

He travelled overland to Bogotá, arriving on 19 January 1825. Travelling onward, Robert found the heavier equipment at Honda on the Magdalena River; there was no way to get it to the mines as the only route was a narrow and steep path. The mines were another 12 miles (19 km) from Mariquita, and Stephenson set up home at Santa Ana in a bungalow. The Mining Association sent Cornish miners to work the mine, but they proved difficult to manage and drank so heavily that only two-thirds were available for work on any given day. They refused to accept that Stephenson, who had not been brought up in Cornwall, could know anything about mining.

His contract ended on 16 July 1827. He travelled to Cartagena to see if he could walk across the Panama Isthmus, but this proved too difficult. While waiting for a ship to New York, he met the railway pioneer Richard Trevithick, (Note: In a contemporary account of the meeting, Trevithick claimed to have sat talking to George with an infant Robert on his knee many years before. However Davies (1975, pp. 158–159) and Ross (2010, pp. 94–95) both consider it unlikely that the Cornish Trevithick had met the Stephensons in Newcastle.) who had been looking for South American gold and silver in the mines of Peru and Costa Rica, and gave him £50 so he could buy passage home.

Stephenson caught a ship to New York; en route this picked up shipwrecked survivors that were so weak they had to be winched aboard, before the ship he was on sank in another storm. Everyone was saved, but Stephenson lost his money and luggage. He noticed that one second-class passenger was given priority over first-class passengers in the lifeboats: the captain later said privately that he and the passenger were Freemasons and had sworn an oath to show such preference to each other in times of peril. Stephenson was impressed and became a Freemason in New York. (Note: Ross (2010, pp. 164, 297) notes that Robert was not seen at any meetings and did not join an English lodge, and considers the membership as a form of insurance.) Wishing to see something of North America, he and four other Englishmen walked the 500 miles (800 km) to Montreal via Niagara Falls. He returned to New York, caught the packet Pacific across the Atlantic and arrived in Liverpool at the end of November 1827.

=== Locomotive designer ===
In 1827 George was working as the chief engineer of the Liverpool and Manchester Railway (L&MR). He had built the Experiment locomotive with sloping cylinders instead of the vertical ones on previous locomotives. Robert wanted to improve the way the wheels were driven and had a chance when an order arrived in January 1828 from the L&MR. The Lancashire Witch was built with inclined cylinders that allowed the axles to be sprung, but the L&MR withdrew the order in April; by mutual agreement the locomotive was sold to the Bolton and Leigh Railway. Several similar locomotives with four or six wheels were built in the next two years, one being sent to the US for the Delaware and Hudson Canal Company. As well as working at the locomotive works, Robert was also surveying routes for railways and advised on a tunnel under the River Mersey.

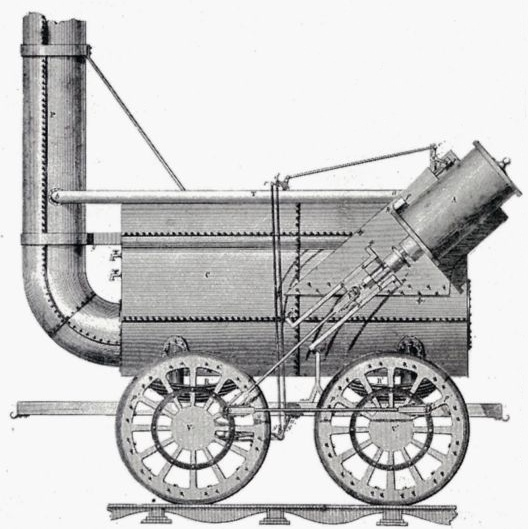
Lancashire Witch (1828)

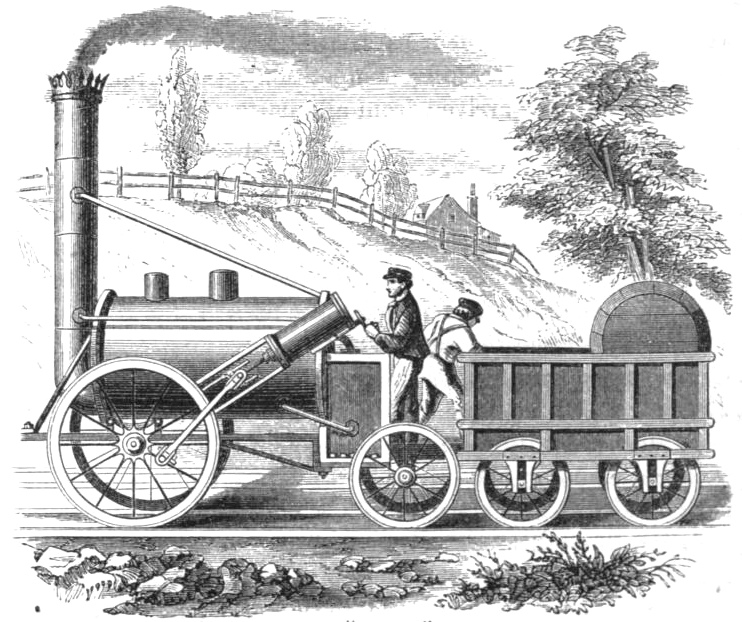
Rocket (1829)

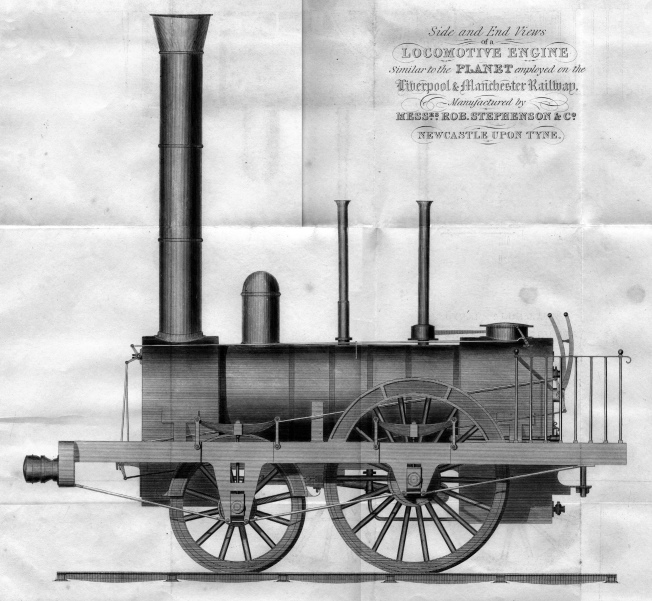
A Planet type locomotive (1832)

The evolution of locomotive design under Robert Stephenson

In March 1828 Robert wrote to a friend saying he had an attraction to Broad Street in London as Frances (Fanny) Sanderson lived there. (Note: Fanny (1803–1842) was the daughter of John Sanderson of London. A relative has been quoted as saying that Fanny was intelligent and able to influence people without them knowing, and not beautiful, but had expressive dark eyes.) Robert and Fanny had known each other before he had gone to South America, and after calling on her soon after returning he had an invitation from her father to be a frequent visitor. He introduced her to his father in August 1828, and she accepted his proposal of marriage at the end of that year. Robert spent so much time in London the following year that his partners accused him of neglecting his business. Robert had not wished for a long engagement, but it took some time until a suitable house was found at 5 Greenfield Place in Newcastle, and Robert and Fanny married in London on 17 June 1829.

The L&MR directors had not decided whether to use fixed engines with ropes or steam locomotives and resolved to hold trials to see if a steam locomotive would meet their requirements. The trials were to be held at a two-mile (3.2 km) double-track railway that was to be built at Rainhill. Robert designed the locomotive for the trials during the summer of 1829. Only two of the wheels were driven, as experience had shown that wrought-iron wheels had a high rate of wear that quickly resulted in wheels of different size, and gears were provided for both forward and reverse running . (Note: To reverse earlier locomotives the driver had to manipulate the valves manually in sequence; with no brakes on the locomotive and wooden brakes on the tender this was the only way of stopping. There was only one S&DR driver that could do this in the dark, the others required the firemen to hold up a light.) The performance-enhancing idea to heat water using many small diameter tubes through the boiler was communicated to Robert via a letter from his father who heard about it from Henry Booth and Marc Seguin . (Note: Marc Seguin, engineer to the St Etienne and Lyon Railway, had the idea at about the same time, and had a French patent. He built such a boiler that summer and fitted it to a locomotive two months after the Rainhill Trials. Although Seguin had visited the S&DR and ordered locomotives from Robert Stephenson & Co, the Booth-Stephenson design was different, and Seguin and the Stephensons had not discussed the idea.) With both George and Booth in Liverpool, Robert was responsible for the detail design, and he fitted twenty-five 3-inch (76 mm) diameter tubes from a separate firebox through the boiler. In September the Rocket locomotive was sent to Rainhill where it was coupled with its tender.

The Rainhill trials started on 6 October, and between 10,000 and 15,000 people had assembled to watch. Five locomotives had arrived, but Perseverance did not compete, having been damaged on the way to Rainhill, and Cyclops, powered by two horses in a frame, was not a serious entry. Challenging Rocket was Novelty, built by John Ericsson and John Braithwaite in London, and Sans Pareil, built at the Shildon railway works by Timothy Hackworth, the locomotive supervisor of the S&DR. On 8 October at 10:30 am Rocket started its 70-mile (110 km) journey forwards and backwards across the course. Rocket covered the first 35 miles in 3 hours and 12 minutes. Then, it took a 15 minutes break for replenishing its coke and water supplies before completing the course in another 2 hours 57 minutes. It had run at an average speed of 12 miles per hour (19 km/h), and the highest speed reached was over 29 miles per hour (47 km/h). Sans Pareil was found to be overweight but was allowed to run. She burnt fuel at more than three times the rate of Rocket before her boiler ran dry. Novelty was tried again the following day, was withdrawn after a joint failed again, and Rocket was declared the winner.

The L&MR purchased Rocket and ordered four similar locomotives from Robert Stephenson & Co. before the end of October. Four more similar locomotives followed, before Planet was delivered on 4 October 1830 with cylinders placed horizontally under the boiler. Hackworth was building Globe at the Robert Stephenson & Co. works at the same time, and Edward Bury delivered Liverpool the same month, both with cylinders under the boiler. It has been alleged that Stephenson copied Hackworth or Bury; he later said he had no knowledge of Liverpool at the time he was designing Planet. John Bull, a Planet type locomotive, was shipped to the US and became the first movement by steam on a railway in New Jersey when it ran on the Camden and Amboy Railroad in 1831. So many orders for locomotives were received that Stephenson proposed in 1831 to open a second locomotive works. It was agreed that the Stephenson name would not be attached to any other works, and what was to become the Vulcan Foundry was developed at Newton-le-Willows.

== Civil engineer ==
=== George Stephenson and Son ===
George Stephenson & Son had been created on the last day of 1824, when Robert was in South America, with the same partners as Robert Stephenson & Co. Formed to carry out railway surveys and construction, George and Robert were both listed as chief engineers and responsible for Parliamentary business, and the list of assistant engineers included Joseph Locke, John Dixon, Thomas Longridge Gooch and Thomas Storey. The company took on too much work that was delegated to inexperienced and underpaid men.

Soon after he had returned from America, Robert took over responsibility for overseeing the construction of the Canterbury & Whitstable Railway, and this opened on 3 May 1830 with a locomotive similar to Rocket called Invicta, supplied by Robert Stephenson & Co. He was also responsible for two branches of the L&MR, the Bolton & Leigh and Warrington & Newton railways. The Leicester & Swannington Railway was built to take coal from the Long Lane colliery to Leicester, and Stephenson was appointed engineer. Robert Stephenson & Co. supplied Planet type locomotives, but these were found underpowered and were replaced in 1833.

=== London and Birmingham Railway ===
On 18 September 1830 George Stephenson & Son signed a contract to survey the route for the London and Birmingham Railway. George recommended the route via Coventry, rather than an alternative via Oxford, but it was Robert that did most of the work; that same year Robert joined the Institution of Civil Engineers as a member. (Note: In 1830 a civil engineer was any engineer not in military service.) There were two surveys in 1830–31 which met opposition from landowners and those who lived in market towns on the coach route that would be bypassed. Robert stood as the engineering authority when a bill was presented to Parliament in 1832, and it was suggested during cross-examination that he had allowed too steep an angle on the side of the cutting at Tring. Remembering that Thomas Telford had cut through similar ground at Dunstable, Robert left with Gooch in post-chaise that night, and arrived at the cutting at dawn to find it the same angle he had proposed. He returned and was in the company solicitor's office at 10 am. That year the bill passed through the Commons but was defeated in the Lords. After a public campaign and another survey by Robert, the necessary act of Parliament, the London and Birmingham Railway Act 1833 (3 & 4 Will. 4. c. xxxvi), was obtained on 6 May 1833, and it was Robert, not yet 30 years old, that signed the contract on 20 September 1833 to build the 112-mile (180 km) railway from Camden Town to Birmingham.

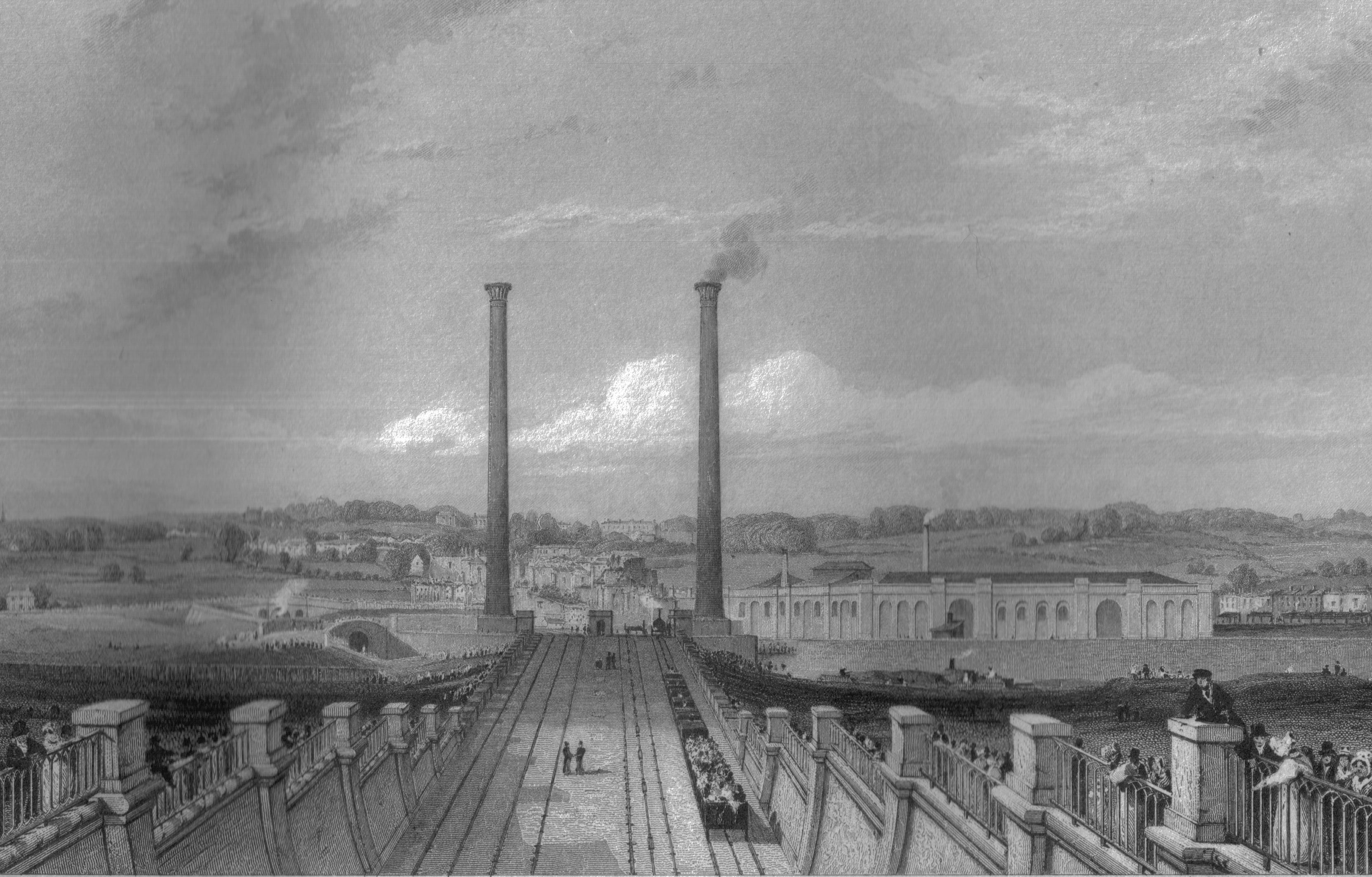
The incline and stationary steam engine chimneys at Camden Town.

Robert was awarded a salary of £1,500 plus £200 expenses per annum, (Note: This increased to £2,000 to match the salary Isambard Kingdom Brunel was awarded when he became chief engineer of the Great Western Railway.) and he and Fanny moved from Newcastle to London. He drew up plans and made detailed work estimates, dividing the line into 30 contracts, most of which were placed by October 1835. A drawing office with 20–30 draughtsmen was established at the empty Eyre Arms Hotel in St John's Wood; George Parker Bidder, whom Robert had first met at Edinburgh University, started working for him there. (Note: After gaining the contract for the Great Western Railway, Brunel borrowed copies of Robert's drawings and modelled his system of draughting on that used by Robert.) Primrose Hill Tunnel, Wolverton embankment, and Kilsby Tunnel all had engineering problems and were completed using direct labour.

The line permitted by the 1833 act of Parliament terminated north of Regent's Canal at Camden (near Chalk Farm Underground station), as Baron Southampton, who owned the land to the south, had strongly opposed the railway in the House of Lords in 1832. Later Southampton changed his mind, and authority was gained for an extension of the line south over Regent's Canal to Euston Square. This incline, with a slope between 1 in 75 and 1 in 66, was worked by a stationary engine at Camden − trains from Euston were drawn up by rope, whereas carriages would descend under gravity. The oft repeated statement that the rope-working was necessary because locomotives of the period were insufficiently powerful was denied in 1839 by Peter Lecount, one of the assistant engineers. In fact the incline was worked by locomotives from the opening date of the southern section of the line, 20 July 1837, until 14 October 1837, also whenever the stationary engine or rope were stopped for repairs, then for Mail Trains from November 1843, and entirely from 15 July 1844, without any real increase in the power of the locomotives. The reason given by Lecount for the rope working was the London and Birmingham Railway Act 1833, by which he said they were 'restricted ... from running locomotive engines nearer London than Camden Town.' (Note: Locomotives were used after July 1844 and the stationary engines were moved to a silver mine in Russia.)

The L&BR opened ceremonially on 15 September 1838. Construction had taken four years and three months, but had cost £5.5 million against the original estimate of £2.4 million.

=== Great George Street ===
In 1835 Robert travelled with his father to Belgium. George had been invited to advise King Leopold on the Belgian State Railway and was decorated with the Order of Leopold; Robert returned with his father two years later to celebrate the opening of the railway between Brussels and Ghent. By agreement with the L&BR, Robert was not permitted to work on any other engineering project while the railway was being built, but he was permitted to act as consultant.

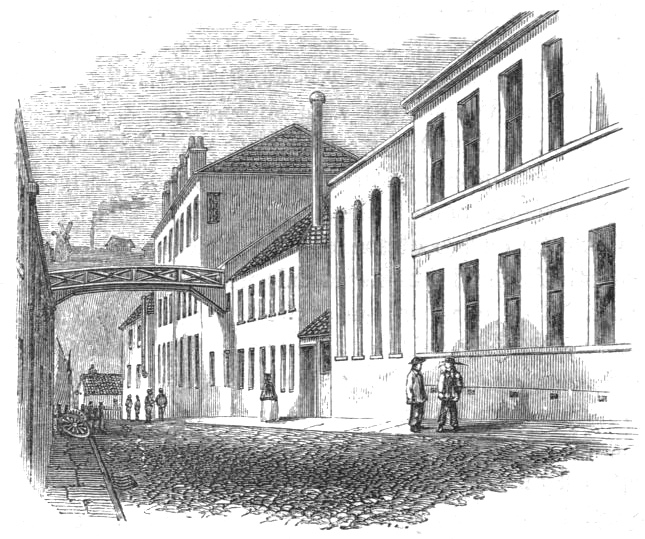
Robert Stephenson & Co. works in Newcastle

The Stephenson valve gear was developed in 1842 by Stephenson employees in Newcastle. The six-coupled Stephenson long-boiler locomotive design was developed into a successful freight locomotive but was unsuitable for sustained high speeds.

The Stanhope and Tyne Railroad Company (S&TR) had been formed in 1832 as a partnership to build a railway between the lime kilns at Lanehead Farmhouse and the coal mines at Consett in County Durham. The partners had decided to build a railway instead of upgrading the existing Pontop Waggonway, and commissioned Robert as surveyor and consulting engineer, and with Thomas Elliot Harrison as acting engineer, construction started at Stanhope in July 1832, and the line opened in 1834. Instead of obtaining an act of Parliament the company had agreed wayleaves with the land owners, requiring payment of rent. The company borrowed heavily, and the debt grew to £440,000; by 1840 the lime kilns and the section from Stanhope to Carrhouse had closed, and the remaining Stanhope to Annfield section was losing money. A creditor sent a bill to Stephenson that the railway company could not pay, and Robert found that as the S&TR was not a limited company, shareholders were liable for the debt. Fearing financial ruin Robert sought the advice of Parker, the insolvent railway company was dissolved on 5 February 1841 and a new limited company, the Pontop and South Shields Railway, was created to take over the line, Robert contributing £20,000. The southern section from Stanhope to Carrhouse was sold to the Derwent Iron Company at Consett. The Great North of England Railway opened in 1841 to York with a railway connection at Darlington to London, and the Newcastle and Darlington Junction Railway (N&DJR) was formed to extend this line to Newcastle using five miles of the Pontop and South Shields Railway. George Hudson, a railway financier known as the "Railway King", was the chairman of the N&DJR, and Robert was appointed engineer.

Some work still needed to be completed on the L&BR, and the North Midland Railway and lines from Ostend to Liège and Antwerp to Mons in Belgium required Robert's attention. In 1839 he visited France, Spain and Italy for three months to advise on railways, meeting the leading French railway engineer Paulin Talabot. When he returned he was in demand, travelling the country, giving evidence to Parliament and was often asked to arbitrate in disputes between railway companies and their contractors.

My dear Fanny died this morning at five o'clock. God grant that I might close my life as she has done, in true faith and in charity with all men. Her last moments were perfect calmness.

— Robert Stephenson diary entry on 4 October 1842

Robert, like his father, planned a railway line that avoided gradients as much as possible, extending the route if necessary, (Note: Later, British locomotive manufacturers were absent when the builders of the line through the Semmering Pass in Austria held trials in 1851 to select a locomotive that could haul 140 long tons (142 t; 157 short tons) up a 1 in 40 gradient. The competition was won by Bavaria, built in Munich with eight coupled wheels.) and proposed such a route for a line between London and Brighton, but an alternative was selected. In August 1841 Robert was made Knight of the Order of Leopold for his improvements to locomotive engines.

In the summer of 1842 Robert was away working on the N&DJR, in September in Cardiff and then in London working on a report for the French Railways. Fanny had been diagnosed with cancer two years previously and she grew seriously ill at the end of the month. She died on 4 October 1842. Her wish was that Robert remarry and have children, but he stayed single for the rest of his life. Her funeral was on 11 October, and Robert returned to work the following day, although he was to visit to her grave for many years. (Note: In 1857 Robert became godfather to Robert Stephenson Smyth Baden-Powell, and Ross (2010, p. 305) notes that Addeyman, John; Haworth, Victoria (2005), Robert Stephenson: Railway Engineer, North East Railway Association, p. 150, ISBN 1-873513-60-7 repeats the rumour that the child resulted from a long-term affair between Robert and Henrietta Baden-Powell, but there is no evidence for this other than gossip. Both Robert Stephenson and Rev. Prof. Baden Powell were FRS, and they were almost exact contemporaries. It was common practice, still encountered today, for a friend to be godfather, and the child named after him.)

=== Cambridge Square ===
Robert grew to dislike the house on Haverstock Hill after the death of his wife. He moved to Cambridge Square in Westminster to be nearer to London's gentlemen's clubs, but soon afterwards the house was damaged by fire and he lived in temporary accommodation for ten months. The Newcastle and Darlington Junction Railway opened on 18 June 1844. A special train left Euston at 5:03 am, and travelling via Rugby, Leicester, Derby, Chesterfield and Normanton, reached Gateshead, south of the River Tyne, at 2:24 pm. Festivities were held in the Newcastle Assembly Rooms, where George was introduced as the man who had "constructed the first locomotive that ever went by its own spontaneous movement along iron rails", although there were people present who should have known better.

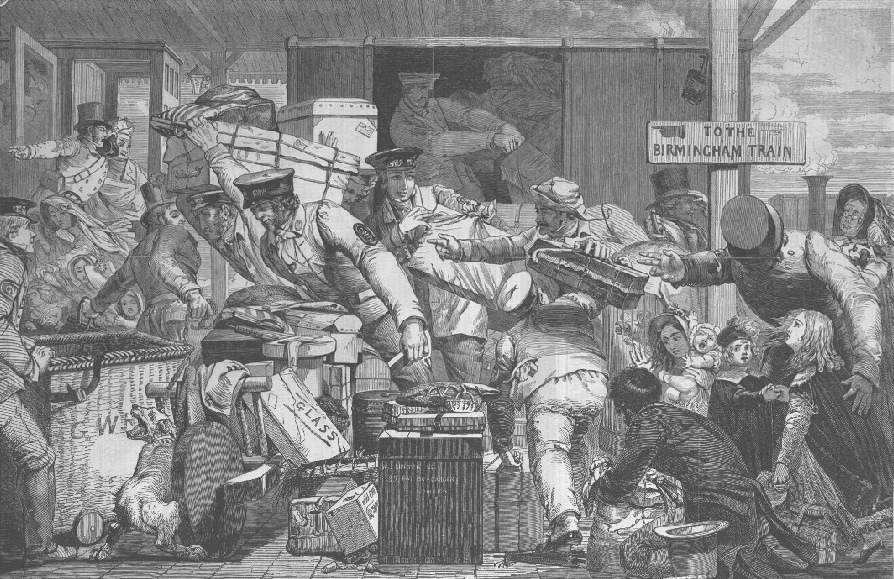
An Illustrated London News cartoon showing passengers changing trains at Gloucester

When George had built the Stockton & Darlington and Liverpool & Manchester he had placed the rails 4 ft 8 in (1,422 mm) apart, as this was the gauge of the railway at the Killingworth Colliery. (Note: Smiles (1868, p. 234) states that early tramroads had rails 4 ft 8 in apart, but Tomlinson (1915, pp. 82–83) challenges this, stating that the most common gauge of the early tramroads and waggonways was of the order of 4 ft (1,219 mm), and some, such as the Wylam waggonway, had the rails 5 ft (1,524 mm) apart.) Isambard Kingdom Brunel, chief engineer to the Great Western Railway, had adopted the 7 ft (2,134 mm) or broad gauge, arguing that this would allow for higher speeds. Railways built with the different gauges met for the first time at Gloucester in 1844, and although an inconvenience to passengers, this became a serious problem for goods, with delays and packages being lost at Gloucester. In 1845 a Royal Commission was appointed and of the forty-six witnesses that gave evidence, only Brunel and his colleagues at the Great Western supported the broad gauge. Comparisons between a Stephenson locomotive between York and Darlington and one built by Brunel between Paddington and Didcot showed the broad gauge locomotive to be superior, but the commissioners found in favour of a 4 ft 8 1/2 in (1,435 mm) gauge, due in part to the greater number of route miles that had already been laid. (Note: Early documents gave 4 ft 8 in as the gauge on both the S&DR and L&MR, but the distance between the rails was later measured as 4 ft 8 1/2 in, and this became the standard gauge used by 60 per cent of railways worldwide. The difference of 1/2 inch (13 mm) is a mystery.) Brunel also supported propelling trains using the atmospheric system. Robert sent assistants to the Dalkey Atmospheric Railway in Ireland to observe, but advised against its use as the failure of one pump would bring traffic to a stop.

Robert's stepmother Elizabeth had died in 1845. That year George was returning ill from a trip to Spain and suffered an attack of pleurisy in the cabin of the packet bound for Southampton. He retired to Tapton House, near Chesterfield, and married his housekeeper early in 1848. Later that year he died on 12 August following a second attack of pleurisy, and was buried in Trinity churchyard, in Chesterfield. George had been the President of the newly formed Institution of Mechanical Engineers, and Robert took over that role until 1853.

=== Bridge builder ===
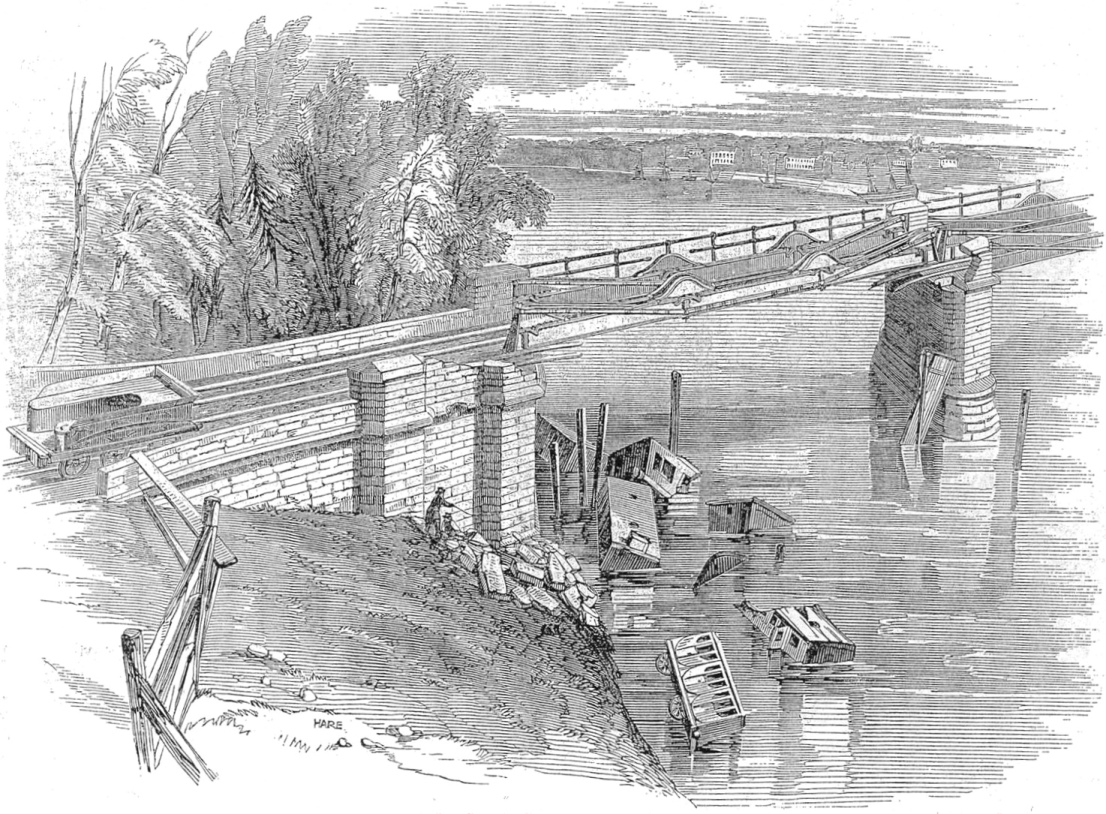
The Dee bridge after the collapse

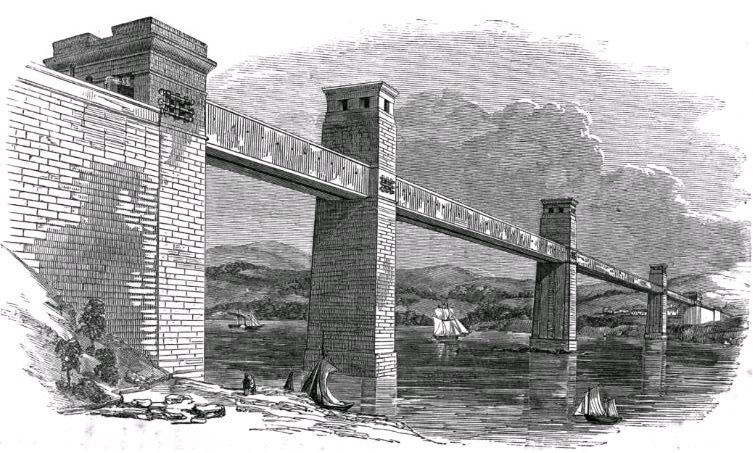
The original box section Britannia Bridge crossing the Menai Strait, c. 1852.

The Chester & Holyhead Railway received its permission in 1845, and Robert became the chief engineer and designed an iron bridge to cross the River Dee just outside Chester. Completed in September 1846, it was inspected by the Board of Trade Inspector, Major-General Paisley, on 20 October. On 24 May 1847 the bridge gave way under a passenger train; the locomotive and driver made it across, but the tender and carriages fell into the river. Five people died. Conder attended the inquest at Chester: he recounts that Paisley was so agitated he was nearly unable to speak; Robert was pale and haggard and the foreman of the jury seemed determined to get a verdict of manslaughter. Robert had been prepared to admit liability but was persuaded to present a defence that the cast-iron girder could only have fractured because the tender had derailed from a broken wheel. Robert was supported by expert witnesses such Locke, Charles Vignoles, Gooch and Kennedy, and a verdict of accidental death was returned. Robert never used long cast-iron girders again, and a Royal Commission was later set up to look at the use of cast iron by the railway companies. (Note: For more details see Lewis, Peter (2007), Disaster on the Dee: Robert Stephenson's Nemesis of 1847, History Press, ISBN 978-0-7524-4266-2.)

The Britannia Bridge was built for the Chester & Holyhead Railway to cross the Menai Strait from Wales to the island of Anglesey. The bridge needed to be 1,511 feet (461 m) long, and the Admiralty insisted on a single span 100 feet (30 m) above the water. Problems during the launch of the wrought-iron steamship Prince of Wales meant that she fell with her hull not supported for 110 feet (34 m), but was undamaged. Robert was inspired by this and with William Fairbairn and Eaton Hodgkinson designed a wrought-iron tubular bridge large enough for a train to pass through. (Note: Fairbairn claimed credit for the design in his book Fairbairn, William (1849), An account of the construction of the Britannia and Conway tubular bridges, to which Robert responded with Clark, Edwin; Stephenson, Robert (1849), General description of the Britannia and Conway tubular bridges on the Chester & Holyhead Railway.) They experimented with models in 1845 and 1846 and decided to use similar design on the 400-foot (120 m) Conwy Bridge to gain experience. The first Conwy tube was floated into position in March 1848 and lifted the following month, allowing a single line railway to open on 1 May. The second tube was lifted into position that October; on these days Brunel was with Robert supporting his friend. The positioning of the first of the four tubes for the Britannia Bridge was carried out in June 1849, when both Brunel and Locke were with Robert, and this was lifted into position in October. The second tube was in lifted into place 7 January 1850, a single line was open to public traffic through these tubes 18 March 1850, and the second line was open 19 October.

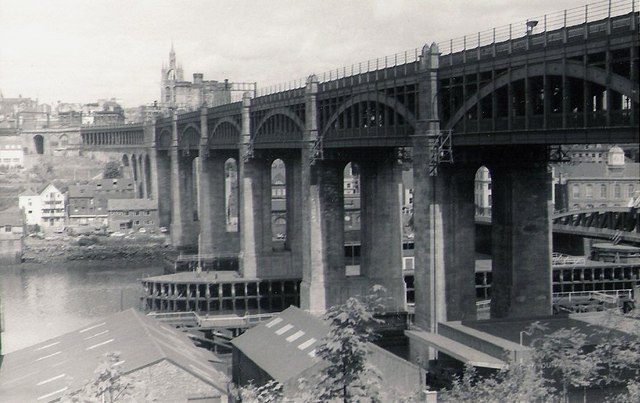
The High Level Bridge in Newcastle upon Tyne, with a road bridge below the railway line, both still in use today

The route north of Newcastle to Edinburgh along the coast, via Morpeth and Berwick, had been recommended by George in 1838, and Hudson promoted this route for the Newcastle and Berwick Railway in 1843. The required act of Parliament, the Newcastle and Berwick Railway Act 1845 (8 & 9 Vict. c. clxiii), was given royal assent in 1845, included a high level road and rail bridge across the Tyne at Newcastle and the Royal Border Bridge across the Tweed at Berwick. The High Level Bridge is 1,372 feet (418 m) long and 146 feet (45 m) high and made from cast-iron bows held taut by horizontal wrought-iron strings. The first train crossed the Tyne on a temporary wooden structure in August 1848; the iron bridge was formally opened by Queen Victoria in September 1849, Robert having been elected a Fellow of the Royal Society in June. The bridge across the Tweed is a 28-arch stone viaduct, and was opened by the Queen on 29 August 1850. At the celebratory dinner Robert sat beside the Queen; he had just been offered a knighthood, but had declined.

== Politics ==
In August 1847, Robert was elected unopposed as the Member of Parliament for Whitby; he continued as their MP for the rest of his life. He entered Parliament as a member of the Conservative Party, holding strong protectionist Tory views and opposed to free trade. His maiden speech was in favour of the Great Exhibition and, with Brunel, he became one of the Commissioners. Robert spoke against educational reform, saying workmen needed only to learn how to do their jobs, although he made donations to educational organisations. In 1850, the pope appointed Bishop Wiseman as the first English Roman Catholic Cardinal since the Reformation; Robert wrote in a private letter that this was aggressive, saying that in the "battle as to the mere form in which the creator is to be worshiped – the true spirit of Christianity is never allowed to appear." He later voiced strong opposition to the Crimean War but supported the government in January 1855, although the government lost the vote and the prime minister resigned. (Note: Although Rolt (1984, p. 325) states that Robert supported the radicals, Ross (2010, p. 266) states he voted with the government, and he was included in the list of noes published in The Times the day after the vote.)

Robert had become a member of the Société d'Études du Canal de Suez in 1846, and the following year had accompanied Talabot and Alois Negrelli to look at the feasibility of a Suez canal. He advised against a canal, saying it would quickly fill up with sand, and assisted in the building of a railway between Alexandria and Cairo, with two tubular bridges that he had designed. This opened in 1854, and was extended to Suez in 1858. He spoke in Parliament against possible involvement in a Suez canal scheme in 1857 and 1858.

== The house that has no knocker ==
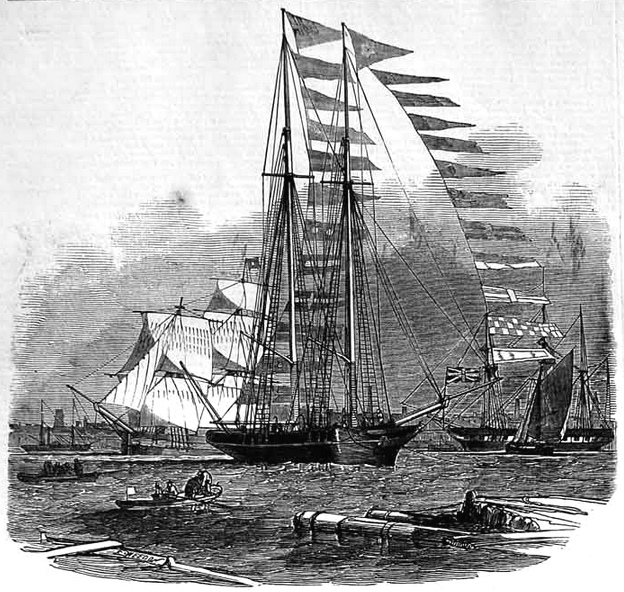
The first Titania in 1850, as reported by the Illustrated London News

Robert had moved to 34 Gloucester Square in 1847; when in London he would socialise at the Athenaeum and Carlton clubs, delaying returning home until late. By 1850, Robert had been involved in a third of the country's railway system, and had prematurely aged and become ill with chronic nephritis, then known as Bright's Disease.

Robert found that he attracted the unwelcome attention of inventors and promoters; if he was too ill to be at Great George Street they visited him at home in Gloucester Square. In part to defend himself from these intrusions in 1850 he commissioned a 100-ton yacht, calling her Titania. Finding that he had no unwanted visitors when aboard, he referred to her as "the house that has no knocker"; when he went aboard, he seemed to grow younger and would behave like an excited schoolboy. He joined the Royal Yacht Squadron in 1850, becoming its first member not from an upper-class background. Titania missed the 1851 Royal Squadron Cup race, which America won and started the America's Cup challenge, but lost to America in a private race a few days later. A second yacht, also Titania but 90 feet (27 m) long and 184 tons, was built in 1853 after the first was destroyed by fire in 1852.

In 1850, the route for the Norwegian Trunk Railway from Oslo (then Christiania) to Lake Mjøsa was surveyed, and Robert became chief engineer. Bidder stayed on as resident engineer, Robert returning in 1851, 1852 and 1854. In August 1852 Robert travelled to Canada to advise the Grand Trunk Railway on crossing the St Lawrence River at Montreal. The 8,600-foot (2,600 m) Victoria Bridge had a 6,500-foot-long (2,000-metre-long) tube made up of 25 wrought iron sections, and was to become for a time the longest bridge in the world.

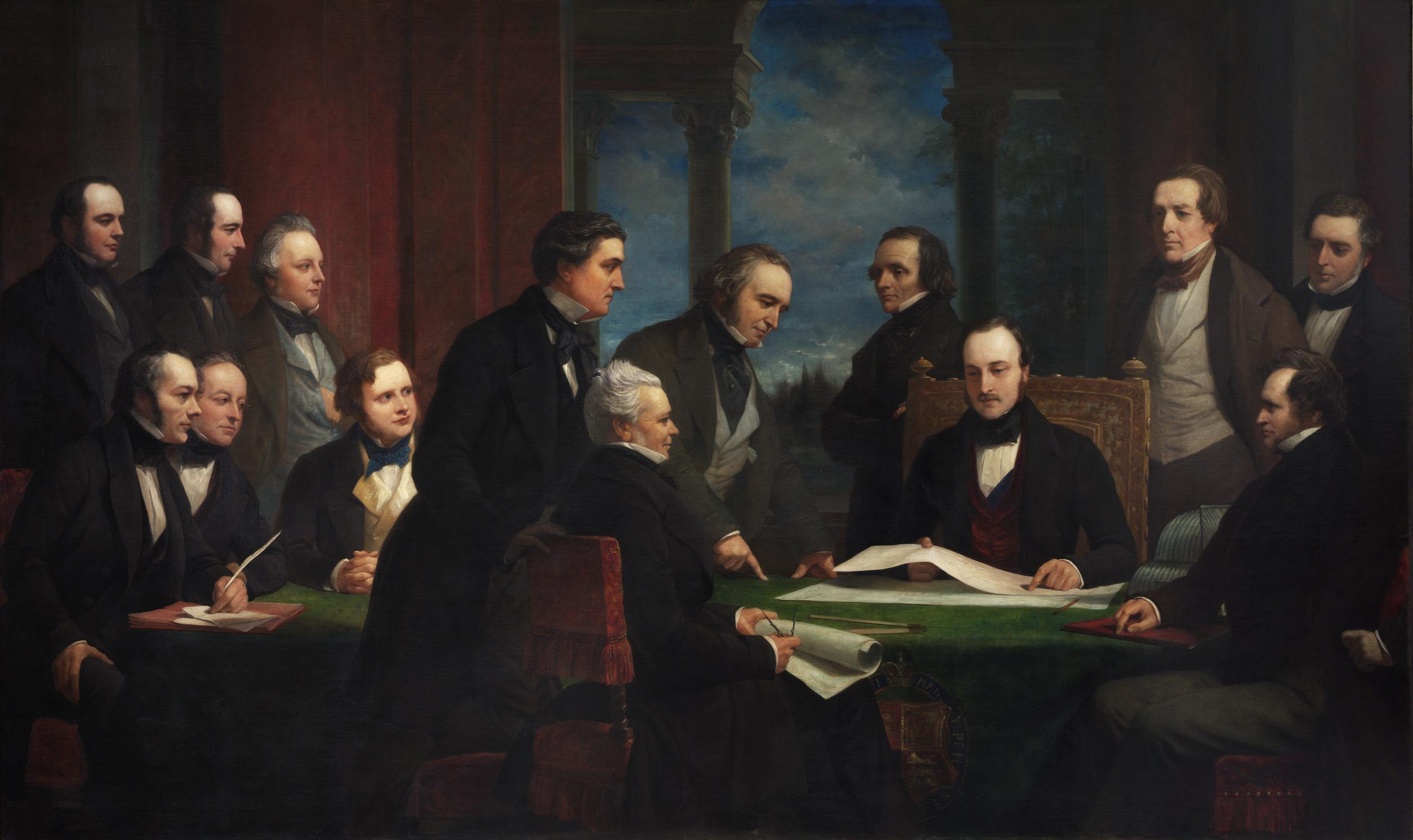
The Royal Commissioners for the Exhibition of 1851 by Henry Wyndham Phillips. Stephenson is standing on the far right of the group painting.

In 1853, he was elected a member of the North of England Institute of Mining and Mechanical Engineers and in 1854 was elected as one of the institute's vice Presidents. In 1855 Robert was decorated Knight of the Legion of Honour by the Emperor of France.

Having served as vice-president of the Institution of Civil Engineers since 1847, he was elected president in 1856, and the following year received an Honorary Doctorate of Civil Law at Oxford along with Brunel and Livingstone.

During his life he had become close friends with Brunel and Locke, and in 1857, although weak and ill, he responded to a plea for help from Brunel in launching the SS Great Eastern. Robert fell from the slipway into riverside mud, but continued without an overcoat until the end of his visit. The following day he was confined to his bed for two weeks with bronchitis.

In late 1858, Robert sailed with some friends to Alexandria, (Note: For details of this journey see Bidder, Elizabeth (2012), The Elizabeth Bidder Diary, Robert Stephenson Trust.) where he stayed on board Titania or at Shepheard's Hotel in Cairo. He dined with his friend Brunel on Christmas Day before returning to London, arriving in February 1859. He was ill that summer, but sailed to Oslo in the company of George Parker Bidder to celebrate the opening of the Norwegian Trunk railway and to receive the Knight Grand Cross of the order of St. Olaf. He fell ill at the banquet on 3 September and returned to England on board Titania in the company of a doctor, but the journey took seven days after the yacht ran into a storm. As Robert landed in Suffolk, Brunel was already seriously ill following a stroke and died the following day. Robert rallied, but died on 12 October 1859. He was three years older than Brunel.

== Legacy ==
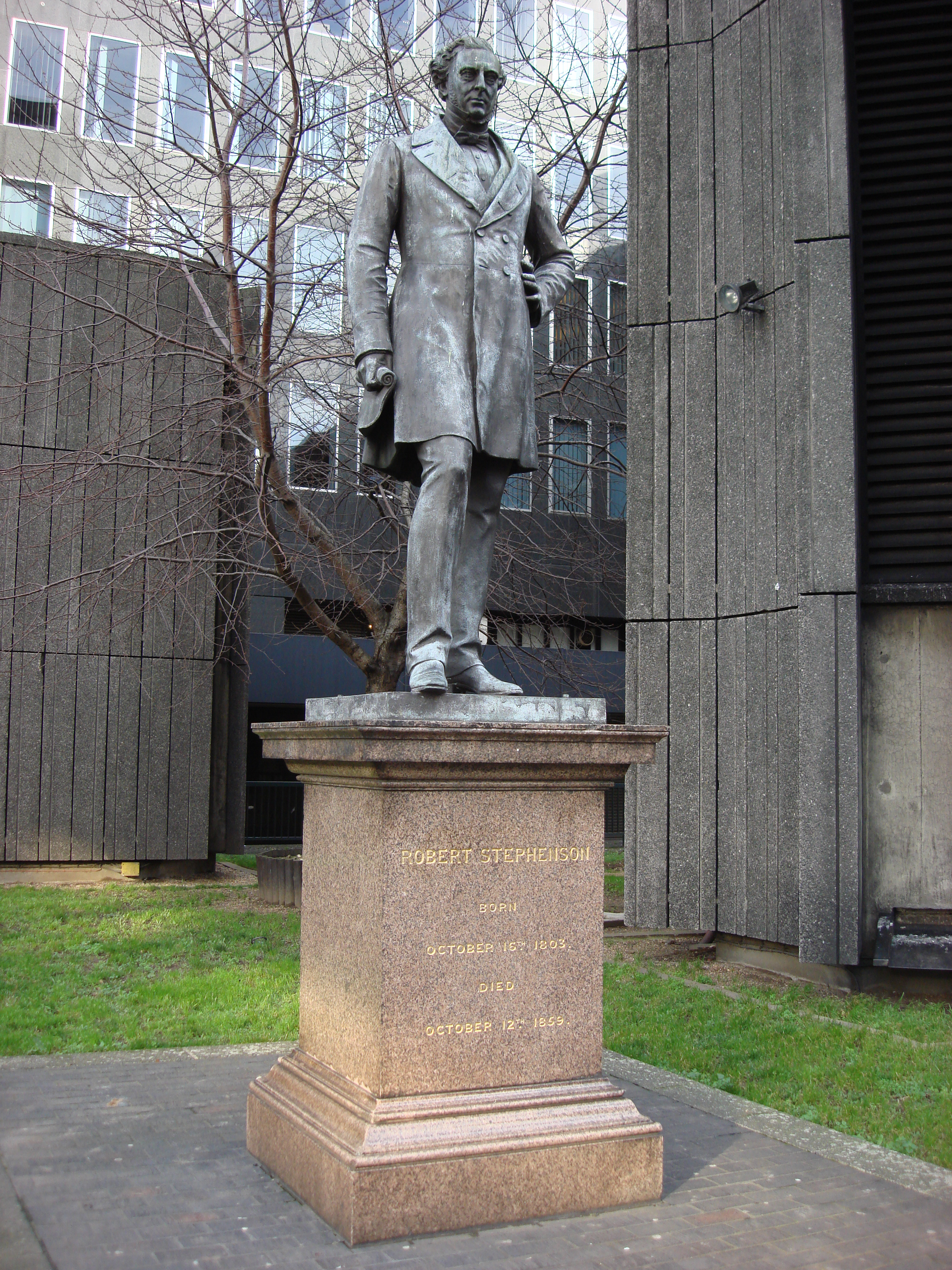
Statue of Robert Stephenson outside Euston Station in London

By 1850 Stephenson had been involved in the construction of a third of England's railway system. He designed the High Level Bridge and Royal Border Bridge on the East Coast Main Line. With Eaton Hodgkinson and William Fairbairn he developed wrought-iron tubular bridges, such as the Britannia Bridge in Wales, a design he would later use for the Victoria Bridge in Montreal, for many years the longest bridge in the world. He eventually worked on 160 commissions from 60 companies, building railways in other countries such as Belgium, Norway, Egypt and France.

Robert's death was deeply mourned throughout the country, especially since it happened just a month after the death of Brunel. His funeral cortège was given permission by the Queen to pass through Hyde Park, an honour previously reserved for royalty. Two thousand tickets were issued, but 3000 men (Note: It was reported in The Morning Post that "Great disappointment was felt at the entire exclusion of ladies", but that space was limited.) were admitted to the service at Westminster Abbey, where he was buried beside the great civil engineer Thomas Telford. Ships on the Thames, Tyne, Wear and Tees placed their flags at half mast. Work stopped at midday on Tyneside, and the 1,500 employees of Robert Stephenson & Co. marched through the streets of Newcastle to their own memorial service.

Robert left about £400,000 (equivalent to £43,452,590 in 2025): (Note: Sources differ as whether the legacy was valued over or under £400,000.) the Newcastle locomotive works, Snibston collieries and £50,000 went to his cousin George Robert Stephenson, the only son of George's younger brother Robert, £10,000 was left to Parker Bidder and the Newcastle Infirmary, and the rest was left to friends and as legacies to institutions. One of the bequests, for £2,000, was to the fund from which the North of England Institute of Mining and Mechanical Engineers was anticipating the creation of its permanent Newcastle Headquarters. Robert was a member of this institute.

== See also ==
- List of British heritage and private railways

== Notes and references ==
=== Sources ===
- Allen, Cecil J. (1974) [1964]. The North Eastern Railway. Ian Allan. ISBN 0-7110-0495-1.
- Conder, F.R. (1868). Personal Recollections of English Engineers and of the Introduction of the Railway System in the United Kingdom. Hodder & Stoughton. OCLC 251964171.
- Davies, Hunter (1975). George Stephenson: A Biographical Study of the Father of Railways. Weidenfeld and Nicolson. ISBN 0297769340.
- Jeaffreson, J.C.; Pole, William (1864a). The Life of Robert Stephenson FRS Vol. 1. Longman, Green, Longman, Roberts and Green. OCLC 794212771.
- Jeaffreson, J.C.; Pole, William (1864b). The Life of Robert Stephenson FRS Vol. 2. Longman, Green, Longman, Roberts and Green. OCLC 794212775.
- Lecount, Peter (1839). The History of the Railway connecting London and Birmingham. Simpkin, Marshall and Co, and Charles Tilt. (Lieut. Peter Lecount, RN).
- Preene, Martin (2004). "Robert Stephenson (1803–59): The first groundwater engineer" (PDF). 200 years of British hydrogeology. London: The Geological Society. pp. 107–119. ISBN 9781862391550.
- Rolt, L.T.C. (1984). George and Robert Stephenson: The Railway Revolution. Penguin. ISBN 0-14-007646-8.
- Rolt, L. T. C. (2009). George and Robert Stephenson: the railway revolution. Stroud: Amberley. ISBN 978-1-84868-164-4.
- Ross, David (2010). George and Robert Stephenson: A Passion for Success. History Press. ISBN 978-0-7524-5277-7.
- Smiles, Samuel (1859). The story of the life of George Stephenson, railway engineer. London: J. Murray.
- Smiles, Samuel (1868). The Life of George Stephenson and of his Son Robert Stephenson. Harper & Brothers. OCLC 1559045.
- Tomlinson, William Weaver (1915). The North Eastern Railway: Its Rise and Development. Andrew Reid and Company. OCLC 504251788.
- Wilson, Arnold T (1939). The Suez Canal: Its Past, Present, and Future (PDF). Oxford University Press. OCLC 1981248.

Parliament of the United Kingdom
Preceded by Aaron Chapman	Member of Parliament for Whitby; 1847–1859	Succeeded by Harry Stephen Thompson
Professional and academic associations
Preceded by George Stephenson	President of the Institution of Mechanical Engineers; 1849–1853	Succeeded by William Fairbairn
Preceded by James Simpson	President of the Institution of Civil Engineers; December 1855 – December 1857	Succeeded by Joseph Locke
