= Henry Coey Kane =

Royal Navy Admiral (1843–1917)

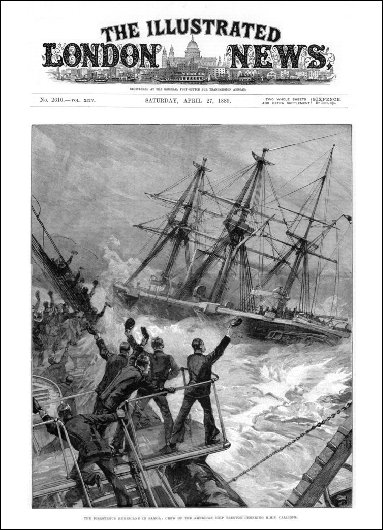
HMS Calliope passing USS Trenton whilst making for open sea, during the Apia cyclone

Admiral Sir Henry Coey Kane KCB (3 December 1843 – 30 January 1917) was a Royal Navy officer.

== Biography ==
He was the second son of Sir Robert Kane, the Irish chemist, and entered the Royal Navy as a cadet in 1853 having been educated at St. Vincent's College, Castleknock, County Dublin (Castleknock College). He was promoted to captain in 1882, Rear-Admiral in 1897, and Admiral in 1907.

He saw active service during the 1882 Anglo-Egyptian War, and from 1883 to 1887 he was a Naval Attaché. In 1887 he was appointed to command the new cruiser HMS Calliope in the Pacific, and after service in China and Australia was sent to Samoa to watch over a growing international crisis there. This posting is generally remembered for a remarkable act of seamanship; when Calliope was in harbour, the island was struck by a powerful cyclone. Of the eleven ships present, only Calliope was able to successfully escape the harbour and ride out the cyclone at sea; the others were beached or wrecked, with over two hundred lives lost.

He was later made CB in the Queen's Birthday Honours for 1891, and given command of HMS Duke of Wellington that year. In 1894, he was appointed as the Director of Naval Ordnance, holding the office until 1897. He retired from the Navy in 1899, and made a Knight Commander of the Bath in 1911.
