= Richard D'Alton Williams =

Irish physician and poet

Richard D'Alton Williams (8 October 1822 – 5 July 1862) was an Irish medical doctor and poet, "Shamrock" of the Nation.

== Life ==
He was born in Dublin, the son of James and Mary Williams, who came from Westmeath. He grew up in Grenanstown, a townland near the Devil's Bit in County Tipperary, where his father farmed for Count Dalton. He was educated at Tullabeg Jesuit College and St. Patrick's College, Carlow.

He started contributing verses to the Nation in 1843. He was immediately successful; in the edition of 21 January 1843 there appeared: "Shamrock is a jewel. He cannot write too often. His verses are full of vigour, and as natural as the harp of Tara".

Later in 1843, he came to Dublin to study medicine. In 1848, with Thomas Antisell and Kevin O'Doherty, he brought out a newspaper, The Irish Tribune, to take the place of the suppressed United Irishman, founded by John Mitchel. Before the sixth weekly publication, it was seized by the Government, and proceedings were instituted against the editors. On 30 October 1848, at a third trial, O'Doherty was convicted and transported to Australia; Antisell fled to the US, arriving in November. Williams tried two days after O'Doherty, was acquitted. He resumed his medical studies, took out his degree at Edinburgh in 1849, and emigrated to America in 1851.

In the USA he practised medicine until he became ill and died of tuberculosis in Thibodaux, Louisiana in 1862. He is buried there in St. Joseph's Cemetery. His headstone was later erected that year by Irish members of the 8th New Hampshire Volunteer Infantry, then encamped in Thibodaux.

He was married to Elizabeth Connolly, with whom he had two children.

== Bibliography ==
- The Poems of Richard D'Alton Williams, edited with biographical introduction by P. A. Sillard, Third Edition, Dublin, 1901
