= Robert Romney Kane =

Irish barrister and writer

Robert Kane
- Born: Robert Romney Kane; October 28, 1842; Blackrock, Dublin, Ireland
- Died: March 26, 1902 (aged 59); Dublin, Ireland
- Occupations: Barrister, writer, historian

Sir Robert Romney Kane, Bt (28 October 1842 – 26 March 1902) was an Irish barrister and legal writer. He wrote also on Irish history.

== Life ==
Born at Gracefield, Blackrock, Dublin, on 28 October 1842, he was eldest son of Sir Robert Kane; his mother, Katherine, daughter of Henry Baily of Berkshire and niece of Francis Baily, wrote an Irish Flora. After attending Dr. Quinn's private school in Harcourt Street, Kane passed to Queen's College, Cork, where he graduated M.A. in 1862 (and later received in 1882 the honorary degree of LL.D.)

Becoming a member of Lincoln's Inn, Kane studied law in London in the chambers of an eminent conveyancing lawyer, W. H. G. Bagshawe, and in 1865 he graduated LL.B. with honours in London University. Called to the Irish bar the same year, he went the Munster circuit and built up a good practice. In 1873 he was appointed professor of equity, jurisprudence, and international law at the King's Inns; and, acquiring the reputation of an authority on Irish land legislation, he was in 1881 appointed a legal assistant commissioner under the Land Law Act of that year. He retained that post till 1892, when he was made county court judge for the united counties of Kildare, Carlow, Wexford and Wicklow.

After some years of poor health, Kane died at his residence, 4 Fitzwilliam Place, Dublin, on 26 March 1902. He was a member of the Royal Irish Academy, a fellow of the Royal Society of Antiquaries of Ireland, for many years one of the two honorary secretaries of the Royal Dublin Society, and a trustee of the National Library of Ireland.

== Works ==
Kane collaborated with Francis Nolan Q.C. in a treatise on the Statute Law of Landlord and Tenant in Ireland (1892). He edited Lectures on Irish History, by his friend Alexander George Richey, published in 1887 as A Short History of the Irish People.

== Family ==
Kane married on 29 December 1875 Ellinor Louisa, second daughter of David Coffey, taxing master in chancery, by whom he had two sons and three daughters. The elder son, Harold, lieutenant in the 1st battalion of the South Lancashire regiment, fell in the Second Boer War while fighting on the summit of Mount Itala on 26 September 1901. His second son was killed in action in the final weeks of the First World War commanding the 1st Royal Munster Fusiliers.
