= Robert Cane =

Irish politician

Dr. Robert Cane (1807–1858), was born in Kilkenny, Ireland in 1807. He was a member of the Repeal Association and the Irish Confederation. He qualified as an M.D. in 1836, became a member of Kilkenny Corporation and was Mayor twice.

He was the model for Dr. Kiely in Charles J. Kickham's Knocknagow. He was MD of the University of Glasgow. He influenced James Stephens and Charles Kickham. He corresponded with Thomas Davis. He was visited by Charles Gavan Duffy and by Thomas Carlyle.

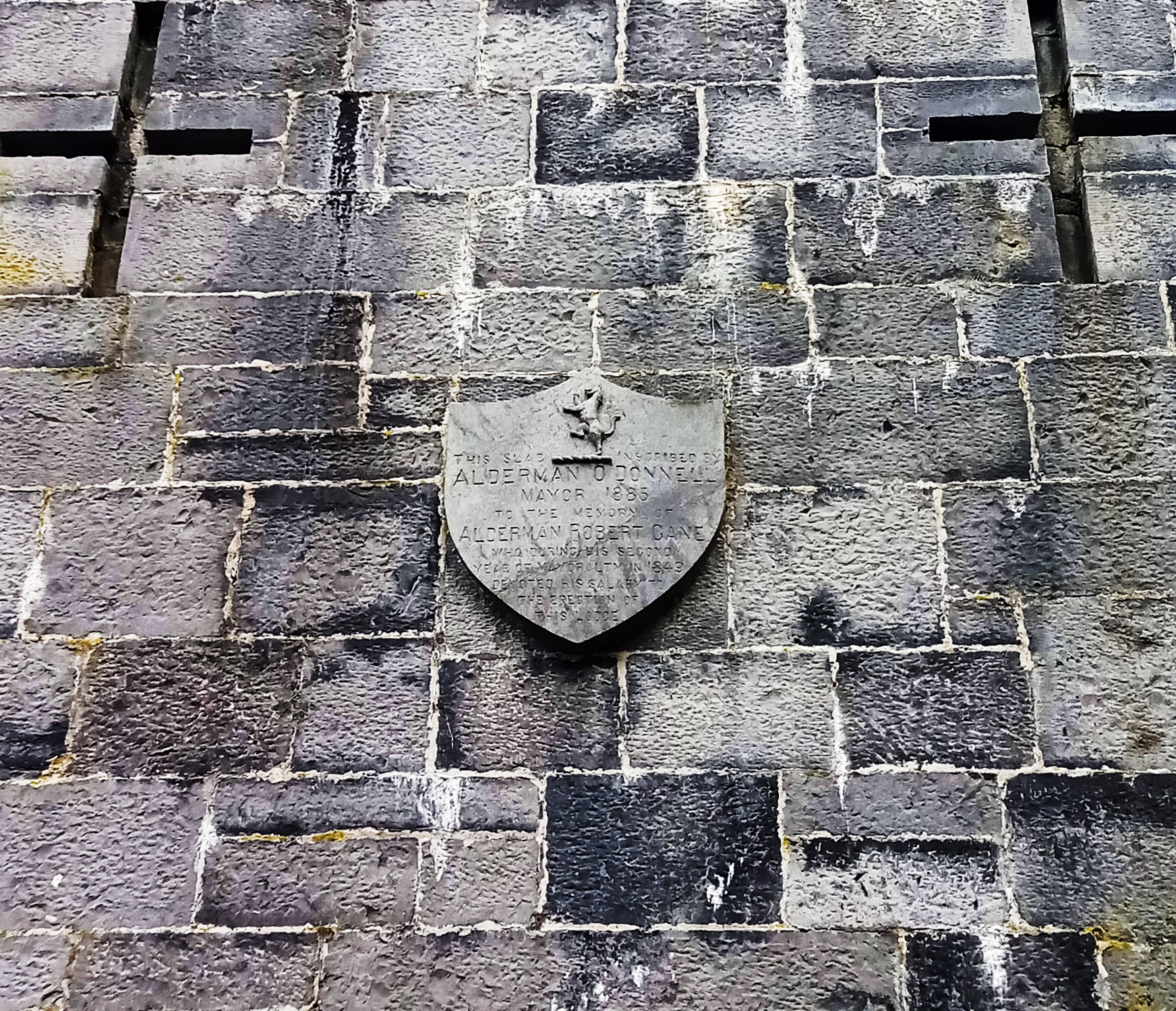
Plaque in memory of Robert Cane

Robert Cane was educated locally and then worked for a time as an assistant to a pharmacist. He later went on to study medicine at Trinity College Dublin and at the Royal College of Surgeons in Ireland. During his time at Trinity he became involved in student politics and attended meetings about national issues of the day. He returned to Kilkenny to give medical assistance during the cholera epidemic of 1832. Robert Cane later moved to Edinburgh where he was awarded his MD at Edinburgh Medical School in 1836.

Following graduation from Edinburgh, Cane returned to Kilkenny where he set up a practice in the city. He became involved in national affairs and in local politics in Kilkenny where he was friendly with the writer John Banim. He also joined Daniel O'Connell's Repeal Association. In 1840 he hosted a banquet for Daniel O'Connell during a visit by the Liberator to the city. Robert Cane was elected Mayor of Kilkenny in 1844.

William Smith O'Brien founded the Irish Confederation in 1847 when he and others withdrew from the Repeal Association. Robert Cane joined the Confederation, however his views, particularly on the use of violence, were at variance with the Confederation and he took no part in the Rising of 1848. Despite this he was arrested and imprisoned following the Young Irelander Rebellion in the year 1848 on 29 July. The Rising had led to the suspension of Habeas Corpus and resulted in Cane being imprisoned for a lengthy period. Following his release he was again elected mayor of Kilkenny. On 19 February 1849 he was one of group of people who met to establish an Archaeological Society for the 'County and City of Kilkenny and surrounding districts'. He was eventually elected chairman of the organisation Kilkenny Archaeological Society on 3 April 1849.

Grave marker of Dr. Robert Cane at St John's Graveyard in Kilkenny

Dr Cane founded the Celtic Union in Kilkenny in 1853. It was a literary society with a strong political bias and intended to publish material relating to Irish history. The Union produced a magazine called 'The Celt' and Cane acted as editor. Dr Cane died of consumption on 16 August 1858. He is buried in St. John's Graveyard, very close to his friend John Banim. In 1859 a series of articles entitled 'History of the Williamite and Jacobite Wars of Ireland from their origin to the capture of Athlone' which he had written were published by the Celtic Union.
