= Robert Kane (chemist) =

Irish chemist

Sir Robert Kane FRS MRIA
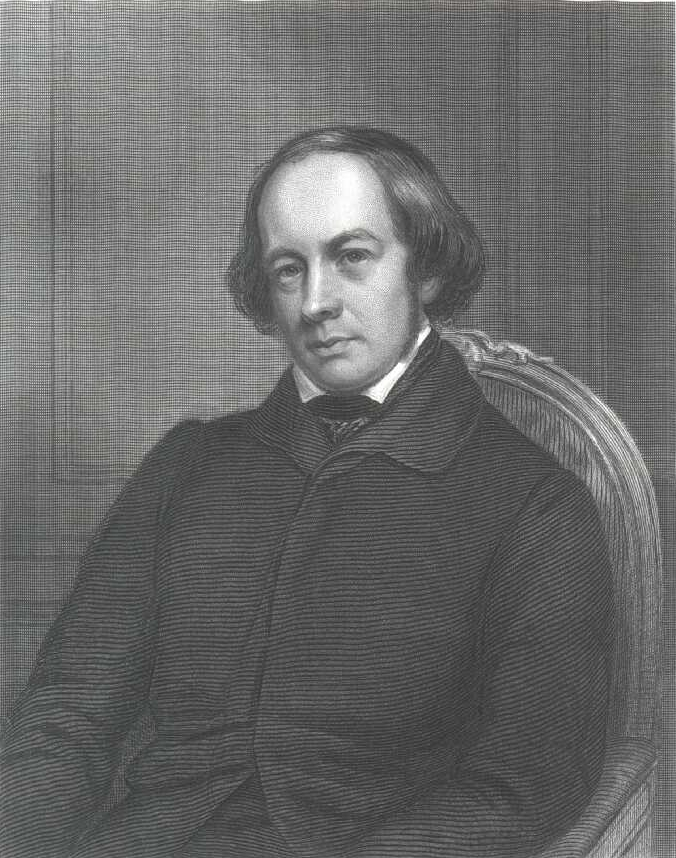

1st Chancellor of the Royal University of Ireland
- In office 1880–1885
- Succeeded by: William Monsell, 1st Baron Emly

1st President of Queen's College Cork
- In office 1843–1873
- Succeeded by: William Kirby Sullivan

Personal details
- Born: 24 September 1809 Dublin, Ireland
- Died: 16 February 1890 (aged 80) Dublin, Ireland
- Spouse: Katherine Sophia Baily (m. 1838)
- Children: 7, including Robert and Henry
- Education: Trinity College Dublin
- Awards: Royal Medal (1841); Cunningham Medal (1843); Knighthood (1846); FRS (1849)
- Scientific career
- Fields: Chemistry

Sir Robert John Kane FRS MRIA (24 September 1809 – 16 February 1890) was an Irish chemist and educator.

== Early life ==
Kane was born at 48 Henry Street, Dublin on 24 September 1809 to John and Eleanor Kean (née Troy). His father was involved in the Irish Rebellion of 1798 and fled for a time to France where he studied chemistry. Back in Dublin, Kean (now Kane) founded the Kane Company and manufactured sulphuric acid.

The young Kane studied chemistry at his father's factory, and attended lectures at the Royal Dublin Society as a teenager. He published his first paper in 1828, Observations on the existence of chlorine in the native peroxide of manganese, in the London Quarterly Journal of Science, Literature and Art. The following year, his description of the natural arsenide of manganese resulted in the compound being named Kaneite in his honour. He studied medicine at Trinity College, Dublin, graduating in 1834 whilst working in the Meath Hospital. He was appointed Professor of Chemistry at the Apothecaries' Hall, Dublin in 1831, which earned him the moniker of the "boy professor". In the following year he participated in the founding of the Dublin Journal of Medical Science.

== Academic life ==
=== Chemistry ===
On the strength of his book Elements of Practical Pharmacy he was elected to the Royal Irish Academy in 1832. He studied acids, showed that hydrogen was electropositive, and proposed the existence of the ethyl radical. In 1836 he travelled to Gießen in Germany to study organic chemistry with Justus von Liebig. In 1843 he was awarded the Royal Irish Academy's Cunningham Medal for his work on the nature and constitution of compounds of Ammonia.

He published a three-volume Elements of Chemistry in 1841–1844, and a detailed report on the Industrial Resources of Ireland. This included the first assessment of the water power potential of the River Shannon, which was not realised until the 1920s at Ardnacrusha.

=== Great Famine of Ireland ===
He became a political adviser on scientific and industrial matters. He served on several commissions to enquire into the Great Famine of Ireland along with Professors Lindley and Taylor, all more or less ineffective. His political and administrative work meant that his contribution to chemistry ceased after about 1844.

=== Educational work ===
His work on Irish industry led to his being appointed director of the Museum of Irish Industry in Dublin in 1845. The Museum was a successor to the Museum of Economic Geology, and was housed at 51 St Stephen's Green.

Also in 1845 he became the first President of Queen's College, Cork (now University College Cork). He did not spend a lot of time in Cork as he had work in Dublin, and his wife lived there. The science building on the campus of this college (now University College Cork) is named in honour of Kane. He was knighted in 1846. In 1873, Kane took up the post of National Commissioner for Education. He was elected president of the Royal Irish Academy in 1877, holding the role until 1882. In 1880 he was appointed the first chancellor of the newly created Royal University of Ireland. After a motion to admit women to the University, put forward by Prof. Samuel Haughton at Academic Council in Trinity College Dublin, 10 March 1880, Kane was appointed to a committee of 10 men to look into the matter. He was opposed to the admission of women, and nothing was reported from the committee in the Council minutes for the next 10 years (Parkes, 2004).

== Family ==
Kane married Katherine Sophia Baily on 23 August 1838, with whom he had seven surviving children. Kane's eldest son Robert Romney Kane was known as a barrister. The second son, Henry Coey Kane, became an admiral in the Royal Navy.

== Bibliography ==
- Kane, R.J. (1831) Elements of Practical Pharmacy, Dublin : Hodges & Smith
- Kane, R.J. (1849) Elements of chemistry, theoretical and practical : including the most recent discoveries and applications of the science to medicine and pharmacy, to agriculture, and to manufactures, 2nd ed., Dublin : Hodges and Smith, 1069 p.
- Kane, R. [1844](1971) Industrial Resources of Ireland, The Development of industrial society series, Shannon, Ireland : Irish University Press, ISBN 0-7165-1599-7
- Parkes, S. M. (ed) (2004) A Danger to the Men? A History of Women in Trinity College Dublin, 1904-2004. Lilliput Press, Dublin.
