= Helen Laird =

Irish actress, costumier, teacher and feminist

- Born: Helen Laird; 12 April 1874; Limerick, Ireland, United Kingdom of Great Britain and Ireland
- Died: 5 October 1957 (aged 83); Dublin, Republic of Ireland

Helen Laird (12 April 1874 – 5 October 1957) was an Irish actress also known as ‘Honor Lavelle’, a costumier, teacher, and feminist.

== Life and acting ==
Laird was born on 12 April 1874 in Limerick to John Laird and Marion Seymour. Her father was a protestant pharmacist. When she was about 24 she joined both the Gaelic League and Inghinidhe na hÉireann. Laird met other Irish actors and dramatists including Máire Nic Shiubhlaigh, Máire Quinn, and Padraic Colum as well as taking drama classes there. There Willie and Frank Fay founded W. G. Fay's Irish National Dramatic Company with a production ‘Deirdre’ by AE and ‘Cathleen ni Houlihan’ by W. B. Yeats and Lady Gregory starring Maud Gonne. Laird was the costumier and set painter. The group then formed the Irish National Theatre Society and together they became the foundation of the Abbey company. In 1902 Laird appeared in ‘Laying the foundations’, by Fred Ryan using the stage name, ‘Honor Lavelle’. She appeared in most of the following productions including what was her most important role as Maurya in the first production of ‘Riders to the sea’ by J. M. Synge in 1903. While she was not normally critically received as an excellent actor she gained praise for her performances in this role. Yeats initially praised her performance in ‘Cathleen ni Houlihan’ but later changed his mind about her acting skills.

In 1906 she sided against Yeats in the discussion about the Abbey being a commercial organisation. She sided with Edward Martyn. They went on to form the alternative Theatre of Ireland with Nic Shiubhlaigh, Seumas O'Sullivan and others. The first production included ‘The racing lug’ by James Cousins and ‘Casadh-an-tsúgán’ by Douglas Hyde. Laird had roles in these. During most of this time she lived in Fairview, Dublin.

== Other activism ==
During the time that Laird was as an actress she was also a science teacher in the girls' school, Alexandra College, Dublin. She wrote articles on botany for various publications. Laird was friends with Robert Lloyd Praeger Augustine Henry, and Grenville Cole. As a member of both the Gaelic League and Inginidhe na hÉireann, and friends with Maud Gonne and Hanna Sheehy Skeffington, Laird was active in politics and was a member of the Irish Women's Franchise League. She and Gonne formed the Ladies’ School Dinners Committee, which ensured 450 children from Dublin's poorest schools were fed in 1911. In 1912 Laird was sent to London by the IWFL to enfranchise 100,000 women through Philip Snowden's clause in the home rule bill.

== Personal life ==
Laird married lawyer and critic Con Curran on 17 December 1913. She continued costuming, for ‘Uncle Vanya’ and acting in Pádraic Ó Conaire's ‘Bairbre Ruadh’ using the Irish version of her name, ‘Eibhlis nic a Bhaird’. She worked with the Save the Children Fund for thirty years. Laird lived in Rathgar, Dublin and had a daughter, the art critic Elizabeth Curran. Laird died on 5 October 1957 in Dublin and was buried in Deansgrange cemetery. Her funeral was a large affair attended by the Irish President Seán T. O'Kelly.
