= Irish Literary Revival =

Genre of literature in Ireland

The Irish Literary Revival (also called the Irish Literary Renaissance, sometimes nicknamed the Celtic Twilight though this has a broader meaning) was a flowering of Irish literary talent in the late 19th and early 20th century. It includes works of poetry, music, art, and literature.

One of its foremost figures was W. B. Yeats, considered a driving force of the Revival.

Because of English colonial rule, matters of Gaelic heritage were sometimes viewed in a political context.

== Forerunners ==
The literary movement was associated with a revival of interest in Ireland's Gaelic heritage and the growth of Irish nationalism from the middle of the 19th century. The poetry of James Clarence Mangan and Samuel Ferguson and Standish James O'Grady's History of Ireland: Heroic Period were influential in shaping the minds of the following generations. Others who contributed to the build-up of national consciousness during the 19th century included poet and writer George Sigerson; antiquarians and music collectors such as George Petrie, Robert Dwyer Joyce and Patrick Weston Joyce; editors such as Matthew Russell of the Irish Monthly; scholars such as John O'Donovan and Eugene O'Curry; and nationalists such as Charles Kickham and John O'Leary. In 1882 the Gaelic Union established the Gaelic Journal (Irisleabhar na Gaedhilge), the first important bilingual Irish periodical with the help of Douglas Hyde, with David Comyn as editor.

== Developments ==
The early literary revival had two geographic centres, in Dublin and in London, and William Butler Yeats travelled between the two, writing and organising. In 1888 he published Fairy and Folk Tales of the Irish Peasantry, a compilation of pieces by various authors of the 18th and 19th centuries. He had been assisted by Douglas Hyde, whose Beside the Fire, a collection of folklore in Irish, was published in 1890. In London in 1892, along with T. W. Rolleston, Charles Gavan Duffy and John Todhunter he set up the Irish Literary Society. Back in Dublin he founded the National Literary Society in the same year, with Douglas Hyde as first President. Meanwhile, the more radical Arthur Griffith and William Rooney were active in the Irish Fireside Club and went on to found the Leinster Literary Society.

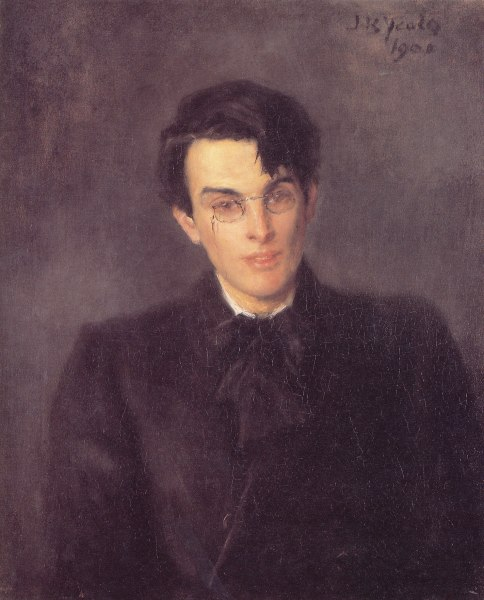
1900 portrait of William Butler Yeats by his father, John Butler Yeats

In 1893 Yeats published The Celtic Twilight, a collection of lore and reminiscences from the West of Ireland. The book closed with the poem "Into the Twilight". It was this book and poem that gave the revival its nickname. In this year Hyde, Eugene O'Growney and Eoin MacNeill founded the Gaelic League, with Hyde becoming its first President. It was set up to encourage the preservation of Irish culture, its music, dances and language. Also in that year appeared Hyde's The Love Songs of Connacht, which inspired Yeats, John Millington Synge and Lady Gregory.

Thomas A. Finlay founded the New Ireland Review, a literary magazine, in 1894, which he edited until 1911, when it was replaced by Studies. Many of the leading literary lights of the time contributed to it.

In 1897 Hyde became editor, with T. W. Rolleston and Charles Gavan Duffy, of the New Irish Library, a series of books on Irish history and literature issued by the London publisher, Fisher Unwin. Two years later Hyde published his Literary history of Ireland.

Yeats, Lady Gregory and Edward Martyn published a Manifesto for Irish Literary Theatre in 1897, in which they proclaimed their intention of establishing a national theatre for Ireland. The Irish Literary Theatre (ILT) was founded by Yeats, Lady Gregory and Martyn in 1899, with assistance from George Moore. It proposed to give performances in Dublin of Irish plays by Irish authors.

In February 1901, at the Gaiety Theatre in Dublin, the ILT performed “The Last Feast of the Fianna”, a one-act depiction of an episode in the tale of Oisin. It was the work of the Gaelic League activist, Alice Milligan. Lady Gregory found the lack of action and long soliloquies "intolerable" and the overall effect "tawdry". But it was a first attempt "to dramatize Celtic Legend for an Irish audience".

The Fay brothers formed W. G. Fay's Irish National Dramatic Company, focused on the development of Irish acting talent. The company produced works by Seumas O'Cuisin, Fred Ryan and Yeats.

Around the turn of the century Patrick S. Dinneen published editions of Geoffrey Keating's Foras Feasa ar Éirinn, poems by Aogán Ó Rathaille and Piaras Feiritéar, and other works for the Irish Texts Society and the Gaelic League. He then went on to write the first novel in Irish, while continuing to work on his great Irish-English dictionary. On Easter Sunday 1900 Yeats' friend and muse, Maud Gonne, founded Inghinidhe na hÉireann (English: Daughters of Ireland), a revolutionary women's society which included writers Alice Furlong, Annie Egan, Ethna Carbery and Sinéad O'Flanagan (later wife of Éamon de Valera), and the actors Máire Quinn and Sara Allgood. The Irish-language newspaper Banba was founded in 1901 with Tadhg Ó Donnchadha as editor. The following year he also became editor of the Gaelic Journal.

In 1903 Yeats, Lady Gregory, George Russell ("AE"), Edward Martyn, and Synge founded the Irish National Theatre Society with funding from Annie Horniman; Fred Ryan was secretary. The Abbey Theatre was opened by this society in Abbey Street on 27 December 1904. Máire Nic Shiubhlaigh played the name part in Cathleen Ni Houlihan. Yeats' brother Jack painted portraits of all the leading figures in the society for the foyer, while Sarah Purser designed stained glass for the same space. The new Abbey Theatre found great popular success. It staged many plays by eminent or soon-to-be eminent authors, including Yeats, Lady Gregory, Moore, Martyn, Padraic Colum, George Bernard Shaw, Oliver St John Gogarty, F. R. Higgins, Thomas MacDonagh, Lord Dunsany, T. C. Murray, James Cousins and Lennox Robinson.

In 1904 John Eglinton started the journal Dana, to which Fred Ryan and Oliver St John Gogarty contributed.

In 1906 the publishing house of Maunsel and Company was founded by Stephen Gwynn, Joseph Maunsel Hone and George Roberts to publish Irish writers. Its first publication was Rush-light by Joseph Campbell. Lady Gregory started publishing her collection of Kiltartan stories, including A Book of Saints and Wonders (1906) and The Kiltartan History Book (1909).

The Irish Review was founded in 1910 by Professor David Houston of the Royal College of Science for Ireland, with his friends poet Thomas MacDonagh, lecturer in English in University College Dublin, poet and writer James Stephens, with David Houston, Thomas MacDonagh, Padraic Colum and Mary Colum and Joseph Mary Plunkett. The magazine was edited by Thomas MacDonagh for its first issues, then Padraic Colum, then, changing its character utterly from a literary and sociological magazine, Joseph Plunkett edited its final issues as literary Ireland became involved with the Irish Volunteers and plans for the Easter Rising. Plunkett published a collection of poems, The Circle and The Sword, the same year.

== Fellow travellers ==
The movement co-existed with the growth of interest in the Irish language (Gaelic League), the Home Rule movement, the Gaelic Athletic Association, and other cultural organisations. It spawned a number of books and magazines and poetry by lesser-known artists such as Alice Furlong, Ethna Carbery, Dora Sigerson Shorter and Alice Milligan around the turn of the century. These were followed by the likes of George Roberts, Katharine Tynan, Thomas MacDonagh, Seán O'Casey, Seumas O'Sullivan and others up to the 1930s. It was complemented by developments in the arts world, which included artists such as Sarah Purser, Grace Gifford, Estella Solomons and Beatrice Elvery, and in music through works by composers such as Arnold Bax, Rutland Boughton, Edward Elgar, Cecil Gray and Peter Warlock, setting poetry and verse drama by Yeats, AE and Fiona Macleod. According to Matthew Buchan, Boughton's highly successful opera The Immortal Hour (1914), based on a verse drama by Macleod, "blends all the essential elements of Celtic Twilight".

== See also ==
- Gaelic revival

== Sources ==
- Boyd, Ernest A. Ireland’s Literary Renaissance. Dublin; London: Maunsel & Co. (1916; rev. ed. 1923)
- Foster, R. F. (1997). W. B. Yeats: A Life, Vol. I: The Apprentice Mage. New York: Oxford UP. ISBN 0-19-288085-3.
- Foster, R. F. (2003). W. B. Yeats: A Life, Vol. II: The Arch-Poet 1915–1939. New York: Oxford UP. ISBN 0-19-818465-4.
