= Máire Nic Shiubhlaigh =

Irish actress (1883–1958)

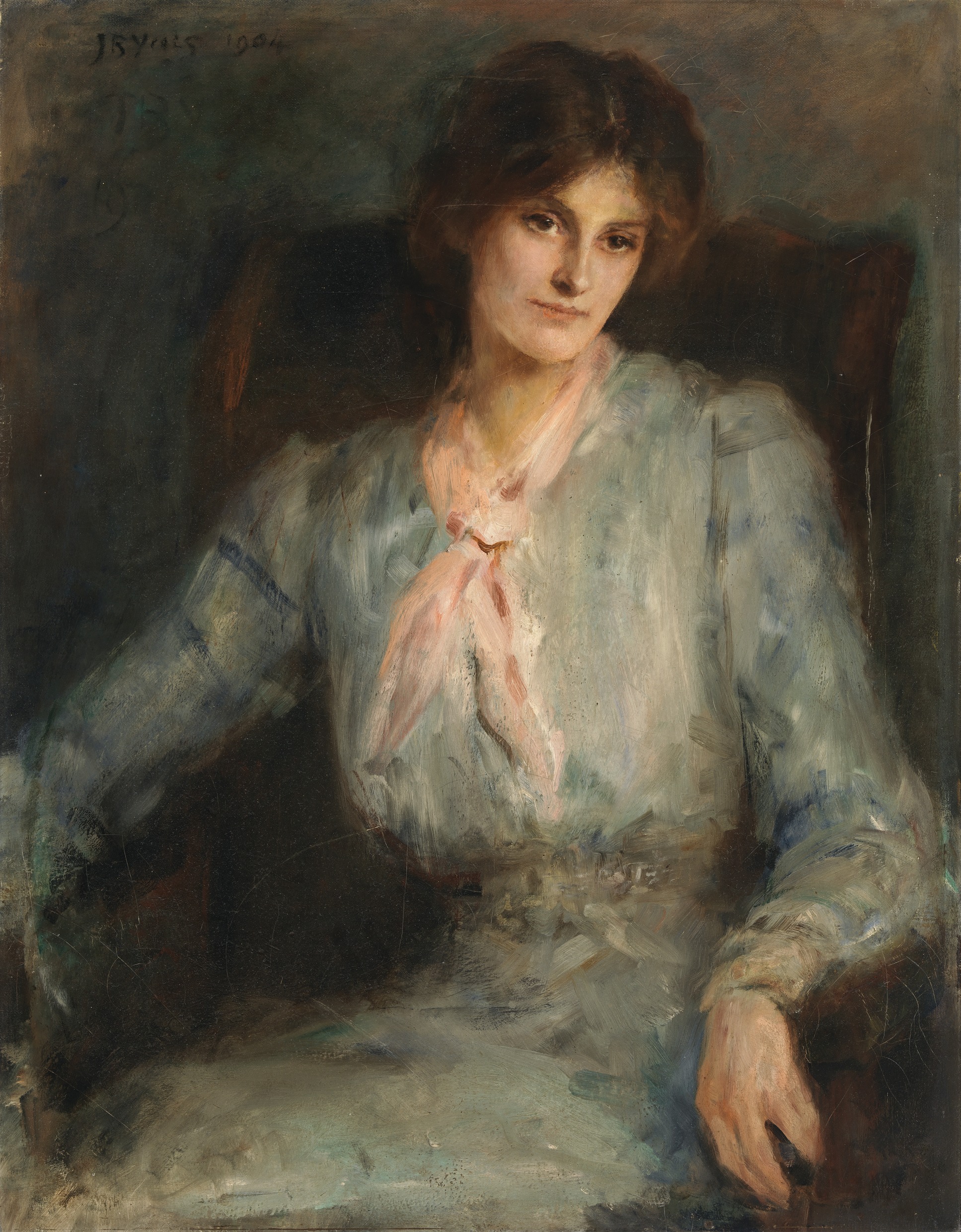
- 1904 portraint of Máire Nic Shiubhlaigh, as painted by John Butler Yeats
- Born: Mary Elizabeth Walker; 8 May 1883; Dublin, Ireland
- Died: 9 September 1958 (aged 75); Drogheda, Ireland

Máire Nic Shiubhlaigh (8 May 1883 – 1958) was an Irish actress and republican activist. She started acting in her teens and appeared in the first Irish-language play performed in Ireland. She was a founder-member of the Abbey Theatre and was leading lady on its opening night in 1904, when she played the title role in W. B. Yeats's Cathleen Ni Houlihan. She later joined the Theatre of Ireland, which she helped to found.

== Life ==
Nic Shiubhlaigh was born Mary Elizabeth Walker in Charlemont Street, Dublin into a nationalist and Irish-speaking family. Her father, Matthew, came from County Carlow (of a County Kilkenny family) and was a printer and publisher who became proprietor of the Gaelic Press. Her mother, Mary, was a dressmaker from Dublin. She grew up in 56 High Street in the Dublin Liberties.

She joined the Gaelic League about 1898 and came into contact with Arthur Griffith and William Rooney. She joined the cultural and revolutionary women's group Inghinidhe na hÉireann in 1900. With the help of drama enthusiasts William and Frank Fay she started acting with the drama group of Inghinidhe na hÉireann. In 1901 the drama group took part in a feis with two plays, Tobar Draoidheachta by Father Dinneen and Red Hugh by Alice Milligan. George Russell (AE) and W. B. Yeats, who were at the performance, were moved by the dedication of the amateur players. Russell, who had already offered the Fays his mythic play Deirdre, persuaded Yeats to offer them his patriotic play, Cathleen Ni Houlihan.

In 1902 Nic Shiubhlaigh joined W. G. Fay's Irish National Dramatic Company, along with others such as Maire Quinn, Brian Callender, Charles Caulfield, James H. Cousins, P. J. Kelly, Dudley Digges and Fred Ryan. Their first production, of the two one-act plays, Cathleen Ni Houlihan, with Maud Gonne in the lead role, and Deirdre, was on 2 April 1902. The company, which had no funds to speak of, acquired a couple of bare rooms at 34 Lower Camden Street, which with the help of friends from Irish-revival societies they turned into a tiny theatre. They rehearsed at the Coffee Palace and also used the Molesworth Hall for productions. In March 1903 she, with other members of her family, appeared in the first production of Yeats' morality play, The Hour-Glass, in which she played the part of the Angel.

In 1903 the playwrights and most of the actors and staff from these productions went on to form the Irish National Theatre Society, which had its registered offices in the Camden Street theatre. Máire was a founder member and on the management committee of the society. Yeats was president, while Russell, Maud Gonne and Douglas Hyde were vice-presidents. William Fay was stage manager. The society founded the Abbey Theatre.

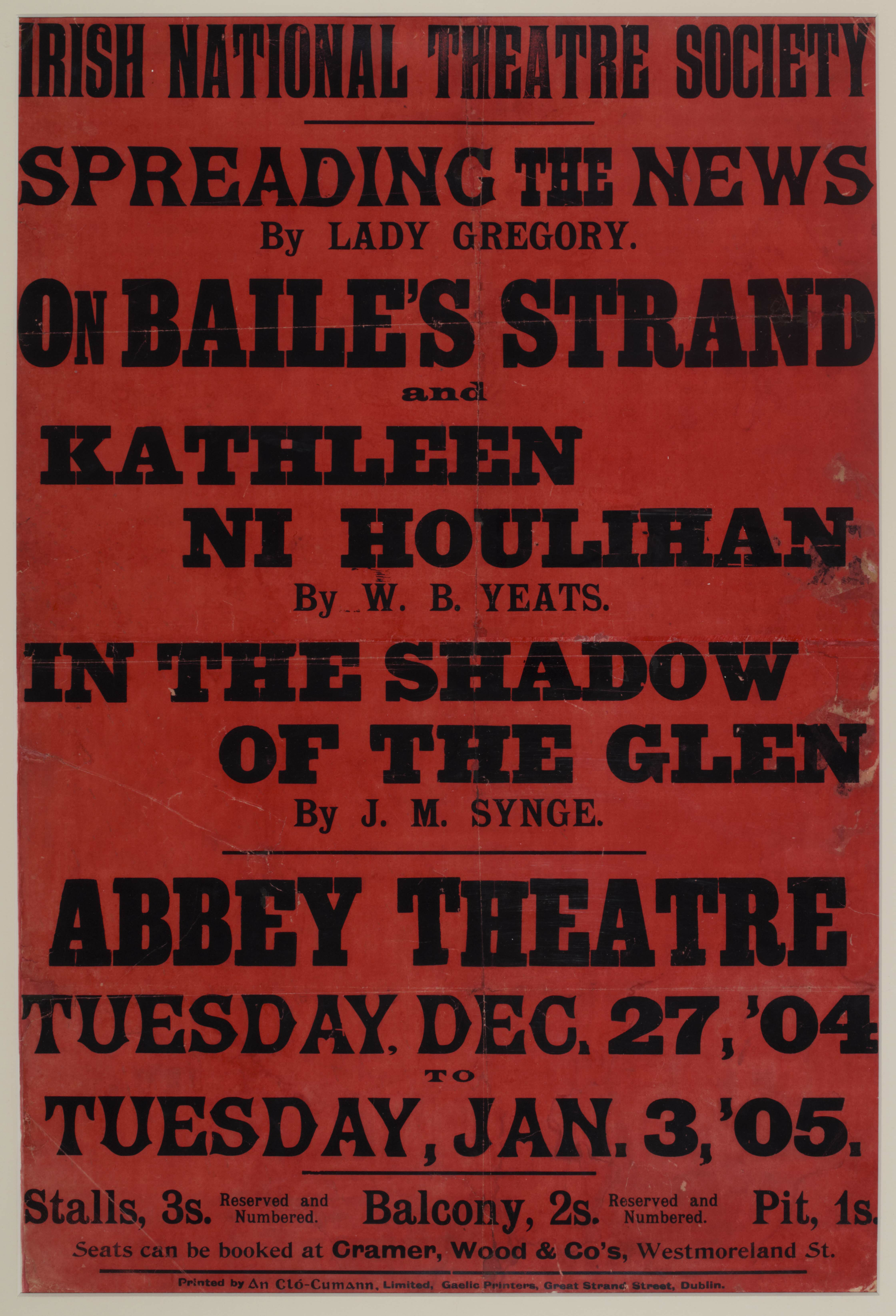
A poster for the opening run at the Abbey Theatre from 27 December 1904 to 3 January 1905

Nic Shiubhlaigh acted in the Abbey Theatre from the time of its founding. On its opening night on 27 December 1904 she played the name part in Kathleen Ni Houlihan. Her portrait was painted by John Butler Yeats for the occasion and hung in the vestibule. She was the principal actress of the company after Máire Quinn's departure to America, and when she left, the burden of the chief women's rôles fell upon Sara Allgood.

In September 1905, the Abbey administrator and financial backer, an English theatre impresario called Annie Horniman, in hopes of improving the artistic quality of the productions at the Abbey, offered to guarantee salaries (a sum of £500 per year) for the actors and for Willie Fay as producer. To her mind, this would allow the actors and Fay to dispense with their day jobs and concentrate wholly upon their acting. The more nationally-minded members of the staff disagreed. Nic Shiubhlaigh wrote: "It was pointed out that the old Irish National Theatre Society had been founded in 1902 on the understanding that its independence as a national movement was to be secured only through the efforts of its members. It would be contrary to these ideals to accept a subsidy from an independent source." For them it would mean a choice between a national theatre and an artistic theatre. At a meeting of the society, supported by Yeats, Gregory and Synge, the motion to accept Miss Horniman's proposition was passed by a majority of shareholdings rather than a majority of votes. Nic Shiubhlaigh along with others resigned, but they agreed to remain until the end of the year, as part of an upcoming tour of England.

Nic Shiubhlaigh remained with the Abbey until December 1905, when along with Honor Lavelle (Helen Laird), Emma Vernon, Máire Garvey, Frank Walker, Seumas O'Sullivan, Pádraic Colum and George Roberts she left. She joined the Theatre of Ireland, which she helped to found. This was formed in June 1906 with aims similar to the Irish National Theatre Society. She returned to the Abbey in 1910.

At the time of the 1916 Rising, Nic Shiubhlaigh was living in Glasthule . She cycled into the city and, along with other members of Cumann na mBan, made her way to Jacob's Biscuit Factory, whose garrison was under the command of Thomas MacDonagh. The garrison guarded the city against the troops of Portobello Barracks, and acted as an information and supplies hub for other garrisons around the city. Nic Shiubhlaigh commanded the women of the garrison. They remained there until the surrender, cooking and rendering first aid to the garrison, and bringing despatches through the city.

== Latter Years ==
She had retired from professional acting in 1912, and would seldom work in professional theatre again. In 1929 she married former IRA Director of Organisation, Major General Eamon 'Bob' Price, and they moved to Laytown, County Meath.

Her last appearance was in the Olympia Theatre, Dublin, in 1948.

Her book The Splendid Years, written with the help of her nephew Edward Kenny, recalls the years of the national revival and the Easter Rising.

On 23 July 1966 a plaque bearing her name was unveiled at the Abbey Theatre by the Taoiseach, Seán Lemass; the others named on it were Ellen Bushell, Seán Connolly, Helena Molony, Arthur Shields, Peadar Kearney and Barney Murphy.

== See also ==
- List of Irish actors
- Theatre of Ireland
