= Maire Quinn =

Irish actress and republican activist

- Born: Mary Roden Quinn; 9 June 1872; County Fermanagh; Ireland
- Died: 21 August 1947 (aged 75); Long Island, New York; United States
- Other names: Mary Digges; Maire Teresa Quinn
- Spouse: Dudley Digges (m. 1907)

Maire Quinn (9 June 1872 – 21 August 1947) was an Irish actress and republican activist, and one of the founding members of the Irish National Theatre Society.

== Early life in Ireland ==
Maire Quinn was born Mary Quinn to Michael Quinn and Margaret Roden in County Fermanagh, but sometimes referred to as Maire T. Quinn or Mary Teresa Quinn.

She was one of the founding members of Inghinidhe na hÉireann, being appointed its executive secretary by Maud Gonne, the society's president. Her sister, Margaret, was also involved in the group. With Gonne, she led a "patriotic treat" in Clonturk Park, and alternative for children who did not attend the celebrations in Phoenix Park during Queen Victoria's 1900 visit to Ireland. This was a significant nationalist event, with 30,000 children attending. Quinn represented the National Women's Committee at the Franco-Irish celebrations held in Paris in 1900 with Jennie Wyse Power.

Initially, Quinn worked alongside Marie Perolz as an Irish teacher in the Inghinidhe. She began acting with the Inghinidhe's work of promoting Irish drama and literature, performing in An tobar draoidheachta (The magic well), which was produced in 1900 with the Ormond Dramatic Company and William Fay. In 1901 the Inghinidhe organised many tableaux vivants in the Antient Concert Rooms with the help of Alice Milligan. Milligan also helped in the first Dublin performance of Eilis agus an bhean deirce (Eilish and the beggarwoman) by Peadar Toner Mac Fhionnlaoich. Quinn played the title role opposite her future husband Dudley Digges in a double bill produced in collaboration with the newly formed Irish National Dramatic Company featuring the first public performance of George Russell's Deirdre at St Theresa's Hall, Clarendon Street. She played Bridget Gillane in the first performance of W. B. Yeats's Cathleen Ní Houlihan in April 1902. At St Mary's Minor Hall, Belfast she played the leading roles in Cathleen Ní Houlihan, and The racing lug by James Cousins.

Quinn was a founding member and the first actress of the Irish National Theatre Society, later the Abbey Theatre. She was pivotal in promoting the work of Padraic Colum by giving Fay a manuscript copy of Colum's Broken soil. She played Brigit in Yeats's The hour glass at the society's premiere performance at Molesworth Hall, Dublin on 14 March 1903. She was critical in mobilising members of Inghinidhe na hÉireann and Cumann na nGaedheal to confront the lord mayor of Dublin, Timothy Harrington, at an Irish Parliamentary Party meeting on 18 May 1903 which became known as the "battle of the Rotunda". The members demanded that he answer the rumors that he would give the welcome address at the impending visit of King Edward VII. Quinn defended Maud Gonne's house in Rathgar after Gonne hung a black flag after the death of Pope Leo XIII during the royal visit. The resulting conflict between the neighbours and police became known as "the battle of Coulson Avenue". When the king visited Belfast later the same year, she protested at a rally at the Fall's Road. Members of the Inghinidhe broadly tried to avoid altercations with the police, but in one flag-burning incident, Gonne and Quinn almost were imprisoned for a night. This led to Quinn losing her job as a typist in a unionist company.

On 8 October 1903, she, MacBride, and Digges walked out in protest at the opening night of In the shadow of the glen by John Millington Synge in response to the portrayal of the heroine who rejects both her mercenary lover and unloving husband. With Digges and MacBride, she formed the short-lived Cumann na nGaedheal Theatre Company having resigned from the National Theatre Society. The company produced five plays during the Samhain festival in 1903. Throughout 1903, she chaired a number of meetings of Cumann na nGaedheal.

== Later life in America ==
Quinn went to America in 1904 with Digges and P.J. Kelly to perform at the Louisiana Purchase Exposition, but she objected to the stage-Irish of some of the earlier acts on the bill by striking. She later acted at the exhibition in Deirdre, but was later fired from the company due to her role in the strike. Following this, she took up a position as a researcher at the New York Public Library. In 1905, she provided a deposition in Maud Gonne's separation from her husband corroborating MacBride's constant intoxication during their marriage. Deciding to remain in America, she and Digges married on 27 August 1907. In 1908 she performed with Digges and Frank Fay in William Boyle's The building fund in Powers Theatre, Chicago. From 1911 to 1914 she toured with George Arliss with Louis N. Parker's Disraeli. After this point, Quinn's acting career declined, while her husband continued to act and direct with the New York Theatre Guild and in film. They lived at 1 West Sixty-fourth Street, New York. Quinn was travelling by boat to their summer home on Fire Island when she took ill, dying 21 August 1947 in South Side Hospital in Bay Shore, Long Island. Digges himself died of a stroke just two months after his wife, aged 68.
