= New Ireland Review =

The New Ireland Review was an Irish literary magazine founded in Dublin, Ireland in 1894. It was founded by Thomas A. Finlay, who was the editor until 1911, when it was replaced by the journal Studies: An Irish Quarterly Review.

Among the contributors to the magazine were George Russell (AE), James Cousins, Douglas Hyde, Tom Kettle, Laurence Ginnell, Eoin MacNeill, George Moore, Horace Plunkett, T. W. Rolleston, Frederick Ryan, John Eglinton, George Sigerson, John Synge, John Todhunter, and W. B. Yeats. These were members of the Irish cultural and political circles of the time, part of the Irish Literary Revival.
