= George Millington =

Irish author and academic

George Millington (1862–1916) was an Irish author and academic, and a member of the Irish Literary Revival. His most well-known work is the novella St. Michan's Vaults, published in 1899.
