= Kicking a Dead Horse =

- Written by: Sam Shepard
- Original language: English
- Genre: Drama

Premiere
- Date premiered: 2007

Kicking a Dead Horse (2007) is an American play written by Sam Shepard. It is an example of a dramatic monologue for one man for most of the play, until a woman shows up, in all lasting approximately 80 minutes.

== Plot summary ==
Hobart Struther's voyage is interrupted by the death of his horse in a desert. Out of frustration, he kicks it. He stands trying to figure out what to do. Struther made millions by buying cheap paintings and reselling them. In a midlife crisis, he has abandoned his wife and rich life for a trip to understand himself. The former art dealer laments his condition. He must bury the horse. This proves to be very difficult. Next he debates different facets of his personality and life, looking as he mentions several times for authenticity, until every angle seems doomed to failure.

== Performance history ==
Kicking a Dead Horse premiered at the Abbey Theatre of Dublin in 2007, starring the Irish actor Stephen Rea, and then with the same actor at New York's The Public Theater and the Almeida Theatre in London in 2008.

The New York production was directed by Sam Shepard, with sets by Brien Vahey costumes by Joan Bergin, lighting by John Comiskey, sound by Dan Moses Schreier; the production stage manager was Barbara Reo, general manager, Nicki Genovese, associate artistic director, Mandy Hackett, associate producer, Jenny Gersten, director of production, Ruth E. Sternberg, presented by the Public Theater, Oskar Eustis, artistic director,

== Publications ==
Kicking a Dead Horse is published by Vintage Books, 2008, ISBN 0-307-38682-1, ISBN 978-0-307-38682-3

== Reviews ==
The New York Times theatre review pointed out that the bleak landscape is reminiscent of the Theatre of the Absurd, particularly Samuel Beckett's Waiting for Godot and Happy Days. The first images of the Shepard play are said to be striking, but there is little development.
