= W. G. Fay's Irish National Dramatic Company =

W. G. Fay's Irish National Dramatic Company was a precursor to Dublin's Abbey Theatre.

It was founded in 1902 by two Irish brothers, William and Frank Fay. In the 1890s, William had worked with a touring company in Ireland,Scotland and Wales while Frank was heavily involved in amateur dramatics in Dublin. After William returned, the brothers began to stage productions in halls around the city. Later, they established the company, which focused on the development of Irish acting talent.

Participants included Máire Nic Shiubhlaigh, Helen Laird, Máire T. Quinn, Brian Callender, Charles Caulfield, James H. Cousins and Dudley Digges. Their first production, Cathleen Ni Houlihan, was on 2 April 1902. In March 1903 came the first production of The Hour-Glass. The company acquired rooms at 34 Lower Camden St., which they turned into a small theatre. In 1903 the playwrights and most of the actors went on to form the Irish National Theatre Society, which had its registered offices in Camden St., and which later became the Abbey Theatre.
