= Nellie Bushell =

Irish silk weaver and activist (1884–1948)

- Born: 23 January 1884; Dublin, United Kingdom of Great Britain and Ireland
- Died: 11 August 1948 (aged 64); Inchicore, Dublin, Ireland
- Occupation(s): Textile artist, political activist

Ellen Sarah Bushell (born 23 January 1884 in The Liberties, Dublin, died 11 August 1948 in County Dublin) was an Irish textile artist and political activist. She played a significant role in the Irish War of Independence, as a messenger, tailor, gun runner and safe house operator.

== Background ==
Nellie was born to Edward and Ellen Bushell in Francis Street, in 1884. Ellen had died by 1901 when Edward had remarried, and lived in Clanbrassil Street. By the 1911 census, Nellie was living in Newmarket Street, Dublin 8. She took on the trade of her father, weaving poplin and silk. She was also an active member of the Irish National Dramatic Company, becoming the Irish National Theatre Society, based in the Abbey Theatre, where Bushell worked as an usher and ticket agent.

== Irish Nationalism ==
Bushell made kilts for Fianna Éireann, the youth republican movement. She soon became a committee member. She worked with Helena Molony and Eamon Martin. She was involved in storing Republican guns in 1914. The day after the Easter Rising began she was called into action, helping to evacuate Watkins' brewery, before delivering surrender orders to Marrowbone Lane.

Following the rising, she helped conceal rebels such as Peadar Kearney. Later she helped to smuggle Michael Collins out of a Black and Tan-surrounded Abbey. She remained a target of Tans attention throughout the Irish war of independence.

She was awarded a (modest) military service pension in 1941, but continued working for the Abbey until 1948.

== Death and funeral ==
Bushell was admitted to the Adelaide Hospital, later dying at home in Inchicore on 11 August 1948. She was given full military honours, alongside attendance from the Irish theatrical world.

Bushell's name is among those remembered on a plaque, unveiled in 1966, in the Abbey commemorating its staff involved in the rising.
