= William Kirkpatrick Magee =

Irish author, editor and librarian

William Kirkpatrick Magee (16 January 1868 – 9 May 1961) was an Irish author, editor, and librarian, who as an essayist and poet adopted the pen-name of John Eglinton. He became head librarian of the National Library of Ireland, after opposing the "cultural nationalism" of his time. From 1904 to 1905 he edited the literary journal Dana and was the biographer of George William Russell ("Æ").

== Early life ==
Magee was born in Dublin, the second son of a Presbyterian minister originally from Ulster, the Rev. Hamilton Magee, by his marriage to Emily Clare Kirkpatrick. His parents had been married at St Mary's Church, Dublin, on 5 April 1860, when their fathers' names were given as William G. Kirkpatrick and Henry Bell Magee. He was the younger brother of Hamilton Malcolm Magee, born in 1866, and another brother, James Henry Magee, was born in 1870.

The young Magee was educated at the Erasmus Smith High School, Dublin, where he got to know W. B. Yeats. He entered Trinity College, Dublin, in 1887, and four times won the Vice-Chancellor's prize for composition in English, Greek, or Latin, for verse in 1889 and again in 1890, and for prose in 1892 and 1893.

Magee's brother, H. M. Magee, lived at the Theosophical Society lodge at 3, Upper Ely Place, sharing rooms with George William Russell, known as "Æ". The two oldest brothers were both Theosophists.

== Life ==
Magee, or Eglinton, was an active participant in the discussion of the Irish Literary Revival, speaking in favour of more universal and cosmopolitan subjects, whereas the focus of several of his contemporaries was on Irish material and traditions. The ongoing debate between Æ, Yeats, and Magee is the subject of a book Magee edited, Literary Ideals in Ireland (1898), which he published under his own name.

As an author, Magee was mostly an essayist, with work appearing under the name of John Eglinton around the turn of the century in several publications, including the New Ireland Review, Shanachie, and the Unionist Daily Express of Dublin. In 1904 Magee launched a new literary magazine called Dana: an Irish Magazine of Independent Thought with Frederick Ryan and Oliver St John Gogarty among the contributors. He acted as joint editor until April 1905, and paid James Joyce one guinea for a poem. In 1904 he was offered A Portrait of the Artist, an early version of Joyce's A Portrait of the Artist as a Young Man, but turned it down with the comment "I cannot print what I can't understand."

In 1904, thanks to the influence of Edward Dowden, Magee was appointed as a librarian at the National Library of Ireland. In 1905, Some Essays and Passages by John Eglinton, selected by William Butler Yeats became one of the small number of books published by the Yeats family's Dun Emer Press.

In 1920, Magee married Marie Louise O'Leary, a colleague. They retired from the National Library in 1921, Magee retiring as head librarian, and in that year, shortly before the new Irish Free State gained independence from what had been the United Kingdom of Great Britain and Ireland, left Ireland to settle first in Wales and later in Bournemouth. From their arrival in Britain until 1929 Magee's "Dublin Letters" were published in the United States in The Dial. He continued to write on Irish literature, and in 1937 his biography A memoir of AE, George William Russell, was published in London. Magee died in Bournemouth on 9 May 1961.

== Selected publications ==
- Two Essays on the Remnant (1896)
- Literary Ideals in Ireland (1899), ed.
- Pebbles from a Brook (S. O'Grady, 1901)
- Some Essays and Passages by John Eglinton, selected by William Butler Yeats, ed. W. B. Yeats (Dun Emer Press, 1905)
- Bards and Saints (Maunsel & Co., 1906)
- Anglo-Irish Essays (1917)
  - including the essay “Philosophy of the Celtic Movement”
- “Synge, John Millington” in Encyclopædia Britannica (12th ed., 1922)
- A memoir of AE, George William Russell (London: Macmillan, 1937)
- Confidential; or, Take it or Leave it (London: The Fortune Press, 1951, poems)
- Letters of George Moore: With an Introduction by John Eglinton, to Whom They Were Written (Folcroft Press, 1970)
