= George Roberts (publisher) =

George Roberts (1873–1953) was an Irish actor, poet and publisher.

He was born in Belfast and became an actor with the Abbey Theatre, Dublin. He co-founded the publishing house of Maunsel and Company with Stephen Gwynn and Joseph Maunsel Hone. This firm published works by W. B. Yeats, John Millington Synge, Lady Gregory, George William Russell, James Stephens, Douglas Hyde and others and became part of the Irish Literary Revival. Between 1909 and 1912, when he visited Dublin, James Joyce negotiated with Roberts to publish his book Dubliners, but their contract was not fulfilled, owing to a series of fears of prosecution for obscenity and libel. The book was published in June 1914 by the London publisher Grant Richards.
