= Abbey Theatre =

National Theatre of Ireland, Dublin

- Ireland's National Theatre
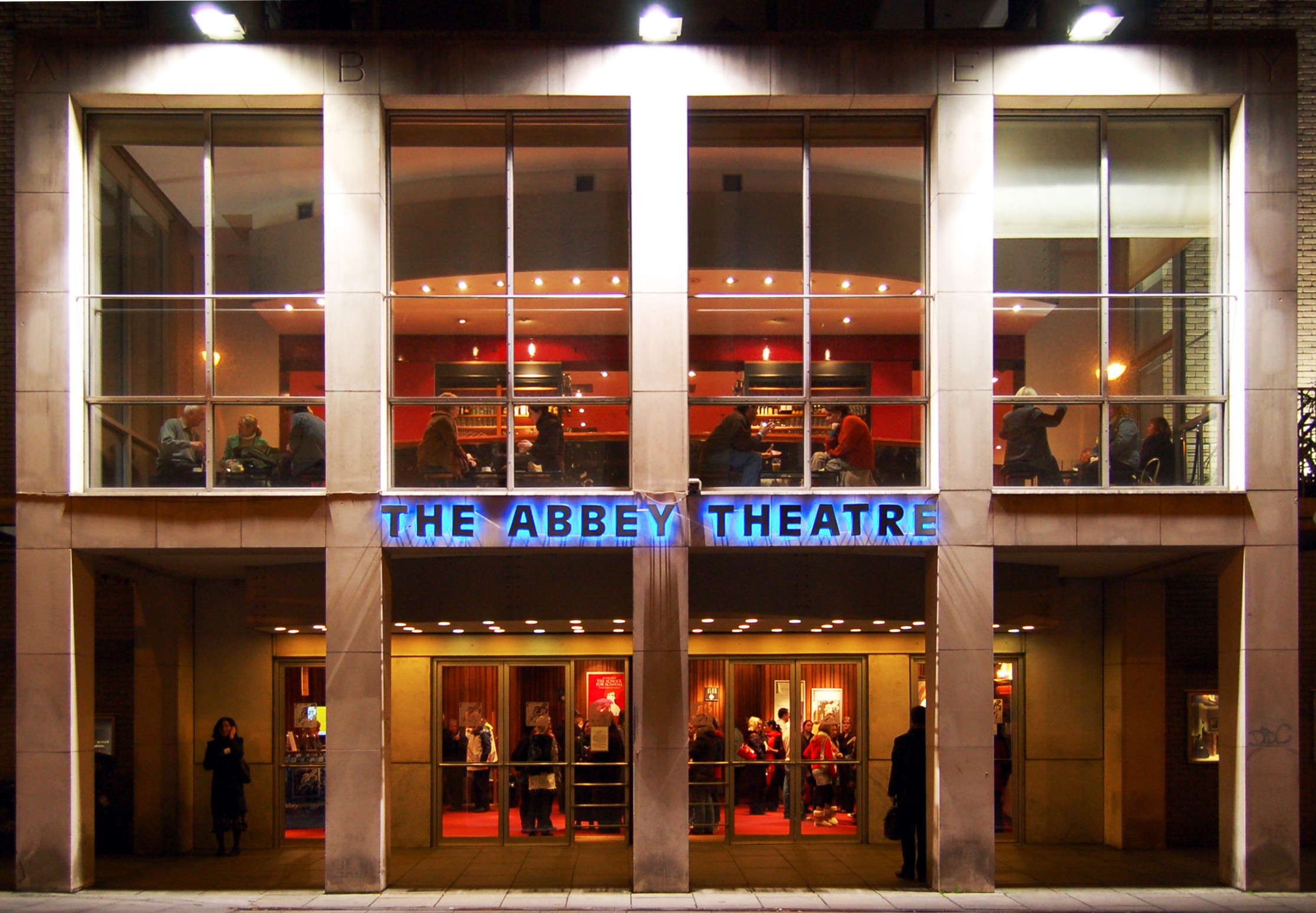
- Front façade

- Location within Central Dublin
- Address: 26 Lower Abbey Street; Dublin; Ireland
- Coordinates: 53.348333°N 6.257222°W
- Owner: Abbey Theatre Limited (prev. National Theatre Society)
- Capacity: 492
- Designation: National Theatre of Ireland

Construction
- Opened: 1904
- Rebuilt: 1966
- Architects: Joseph Holloway (1904); Michael Scott (1966)

Website
- www.abbeytheatre.ie

The Abbey Theatre (Irish: Amharclann na Mainistreach), also known as the National Theatre of Ireland (Irish: Amharclann Náisiúnta na hÉireann) is a theatre in Dublin, Ireland. It first opened to the public on 27 December 1904, and moved from its original building after a fire in 1951, it has remained active to the present day. The Abbey was the first state-subsidized theatre in the English-speaking world; from 1925 onwards it received an annual subsidy from the Irish Free State. Since July 1966, the Abbey has been located at 26 Lower Abbey Street, Dublin 1.

In its early years, the theatre was closely associated with the writers of the Irish Literary Revival, many of whom were involved in its founding and most of whom had plays staged there. The Abbey served as a nursery for many of leading Irish playwrights, including William Butler Yeats, Lady Gregory, Seán O'Casey and John Millington Synge, as well as leading actors. In addition, through its extensive programme of touring abroad and its high visibility to foreign, particularly American, audiences, it has become an important part of the Irish theatre history and Irish cultural brand.

== History ==
=== Origins ===
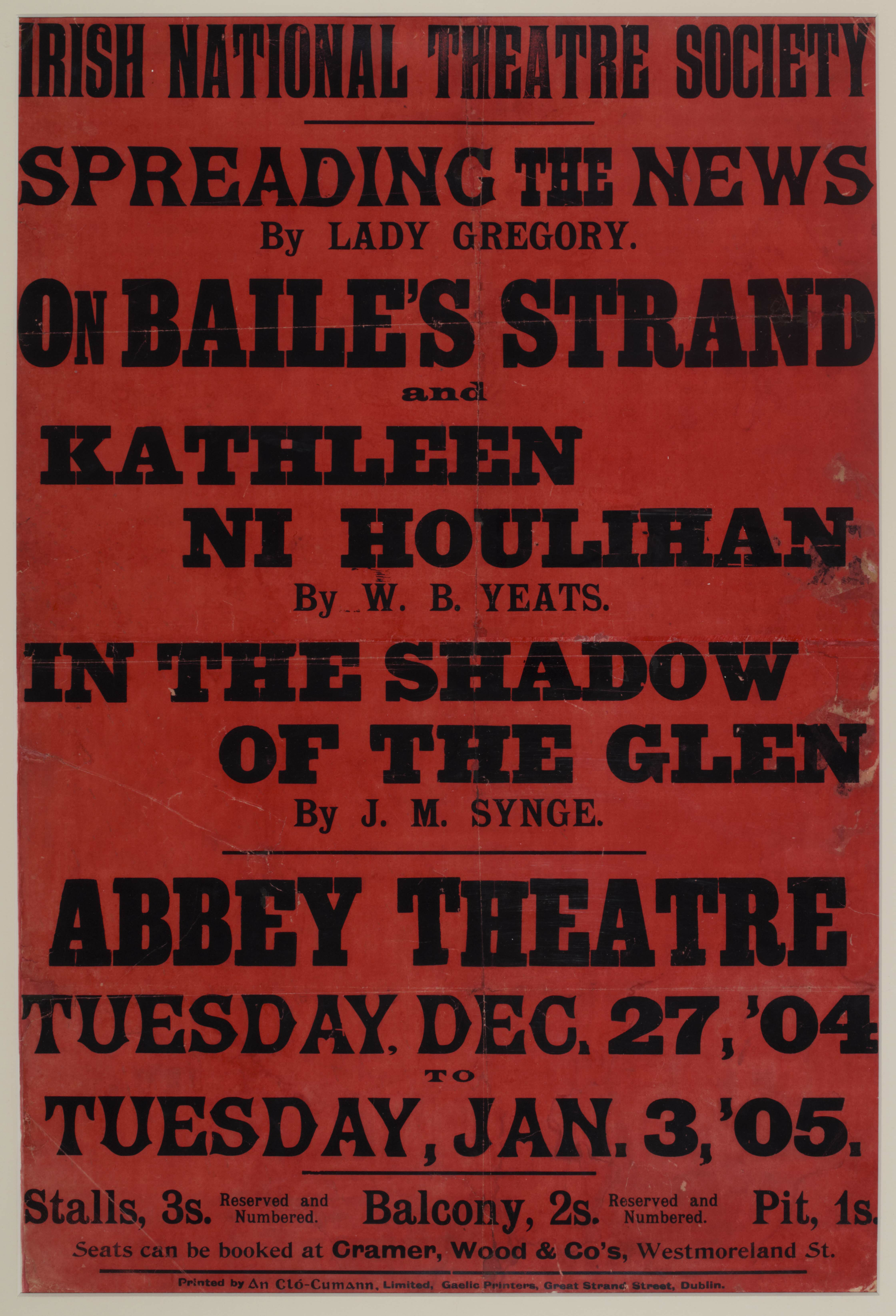
A poster for the opening run at the Abbey Theatre from 27 December 1904 to 3 January 1905

The Abbey arose from three distinct bases. The first was the seminal Irish Literary Theatre. Founded by Lady Gregory, Edward Martyn and W. B. Yeats in 1899—with assistance from George Moore—it presented plays in the Antient Concert Rooms and the Gaiety Theatre, which brought critical approval but limited public interest. Lady Gregory envisioned a society promoting "ancient idealism" dedicated to crafting works of Irish theatre pairing Irish culture with European theatrical methods.

The second base involved the work of two Dublin directors, William and Frank Fay. William worked in the 1890s with a touring company in Ireland, Scotland and Wales, while his brother Frank was involved in amateur dramatics in Dublin. After William returned to Dublin, the Fay brothers staged productions in halls around the city and eventually formed W. G. Fay's Irish National Dramatic Company, focused on the development of Irish acting talent. In April 1902, the Fays gave three performances of Æ's play Deirdre and Yeats' Cathleen Ní Houlihan in St Theresa's Hall on Clarendon Street. The performances played to a mainly working-class audience rather than the usual middle-class Dublin theatregoers. The run was a great success, thanks in part to the beauty and force of Maud Gonne, who played the lead in Yeats' play. The company continued at the Antient Concert Rooms, producing works by Seumas O'Cuisin, Fred Ryan and Yeats.

The third base was the financial support and experience of Annie Horniman, a middle-class Englishwoman with previous experience in theatre production, having been involved in the presentation of George Bernard Shaw's Arms and the Man in London in 1894. An acquaintance of Yeats from London circles, including the Order of the Golden Dawn, she came to Dublin in 1903 to act as Yeats' unpaid secretary and to make costumes for a production of his play The King's Threshold. Her money helped found the Abbey Theatre and, according to the critic Adrian Frazier, would "make the rich feel at home, and the poor—on a first visit—out of place."

The founding of the Theatre is also connected with a broader wave of change found in European drama at the end of the nineteenth century. The founding of Théâtre Libre in Paris in 1887 and the work of the Moscow Art Theatre in 1895 represented a challenge to a "stale metropolitanism". This movement echoes Lady Gregory's commitment and determination to make the Abbey Theatre a theatre for the people.

=== Foundation ===
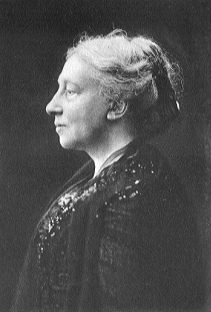
Lady Gregory pictured on the frontispiece to Our Irish Theatre: A Chapter of Autobiography (1913)

Encouraged by the St Theresa's Hall success, Yeats, Lady Gregory, Æ, Martyn, and John Millington Synge founded the Irish National Theatre Society in 1903 with funding from Horniman. They were joined by actors and playwrights from Fay's company. At first, they staged performances in the Molesworth Hall. When the Mechanics' Theatre in Lower Abbey Street and an adjacent building in Marlborough Street became available after fire safety authorities closed it, Horniman and William Fay agreed to buy and refit the space to meet the society's needs.

On 11 May 1904, the Society formally accepted Horniman's offer of the use of the building. As Horniman did not usually reside in Ireland, the royal letters patent required were granted in the name of Lady Gregory, although paid for by Horniman. The founders appointed William Fay theatre manager, responsible for training the actors in the newly established repertory company. They commissioned Yeats' father John to paint portraits of all the leading figures in the society for the foyer, and hired Sarah Purser to design stained glass for the same space.

On 27 December, the curtains went up on opening night. The bill consisted of three one-act plays, On Baile's Strand and Cathleen Ní Houlihan by Yeats, and Spreading the News by Lady Gregory. On the second night, In the Shadow of the Glen by Synge replaced the second Yeats play. These two bills alternated over a five-night run. Frank Fay, playing Cúchulainn in On Baile's Strand, was the first actor on the Abbey stage. Although Horniman had designed the costumes, neither she nor Lady Gregory was present, as Horniman had already returned to England. In addition to providing funding, her chief role with the Abbey over the coming years was to organise publicity and bookings for their touring productions in London and provincial England.

In 1905 without properly consulting Horniman, Yeats, Lady Gregory and Synge decided to turn the theatre into a limited liability company, the National Theatre Society Ltd. Annoyed by this treatment, Horniman hired Ben Iden Payne, a former Abbey employee, to help run a new repertory company which she founded in Manchester. Leading actors Máire Nic Shiubhlaigh, Honor Lavelle (Helen Laird), Emma Vernon, Máire Garvey, Frank Walker, Seumas O'Sullivan, Pádraic Colum and George Roberts left the Abbey.

The press was impressed with the building and the Cork Constitution wrote that "the theatre has neither orchestra nor bar, and the principal entrance is through a building which was formerly the Dublin morgue." Theatregoers were surprised and thought it to be scandalous that part of the theatre used to be a morgue. The orchestra was established under the guidance of John F Larchet.

==== Contributions of founders and funders ====
===== Lady Gregory =====
Gregory helped create the Irish Literary Theatre, which would later form one base for the INTS, with W.B. Yeats and Edward Martyn. She met Yeats in 1898, and he admitted to her that it was a dream of his to create a theatre in which new ambitious Irish plays could be performed. The idea seemed more and more possible to achieve as they kept talking and by the end of their first meeting they had a plan for how to make a "national theatre" a reality. In the first year of the theatre, Lady Gregory was in charge of finding money and support from patrons, and she even donated some of her own money. She was critical in making the ILT and the INTS function financially before Annie Horniman's support.

In 1903, when Horniman offered the INTS a theatre, Lady Gregory schemed to bypass the terms of the deal. She didn't like Horniman and was happy when she left, saying she was "free from her and from further foreign invasion." She wrote many plays for the theatre, specializing in the one-act play.

===== William Butler Yeats =====
The Abbey Theatre is sometimes called Yeats' theatre or a manifestation of his own artistic ambitions and ideals. He wanted a theatre in which the playwright's words were the most important thing, prevailing over the actor and the audience. It was very important to him that the authors had control. It was because of him and his efforts that Lady Gregory, Synge and he became the Board of Directors of the INTS. It was only after meeting Lady Gregory that Yeats thought the creation of such a theatre possible. He worked closely with her for almost a year before the first production of the ILT, during which his play Cathleen Ni Houlihan and Edward Martyn's The Heather Field were performed to great success, some even calling it "the cultural event of the decade," though some accused him of being too political or even of writing a heretical play.

He then adopted a new, more inclusive politic, which helped him and Lady Gregory recruit many new patrons, most Protestant and/or Unionist. As early as 1900, Yeats sent a letter to Lady Gregory that implied that he was confident about finding a reliable patron who, at the time, remained anonymous. The patron he was talking about was Annie Horniman, who had anonymously financed Yeats' first play in 1884. By that point, he was starting to want The Abbey to be seen as nationalist. However, by October 1901, he had lost interest in the ILT as a means to express his artistic vision, as he was forced to make sacrifices to accommodate co-workers. He chose to stay because of his relationship with Horniman, who he saw as a means to secure his ambitions and those of the Fay Brothers' troupe of Irish actors.

His relationship with Horniman was essential to his projects, so much so that he declared in front of an audience that he would not accept money from Nationalists and Unionists, which forced him to change the entire politics of the INTS. He gave this speech in 1903 and by 1904 he was the president of the Abbey Theatre. When Horniman left, he wanted to bring back the nationalist aspect the theatre once had but was stopped by a threat from Horniman to close it down; he finally had the last word with the help of Bernard Shaw and Lady Gregory. During the summer of 1909, Shaw offered his play Blanco Posnet to the Abbey, a play previously censored that allowed him to challenge British authority and to come back to the good graces of Nationalists, thus giving him a new reputation and making the INTS closer to becoming "a representative Irish Institution." Following Horniman's offer to sell him back the theatre, he then tried to "play" her so that she would pay more. Yeats, with the help of Lady Gregory, bought the Abbey back and sued Horniman for the subsidy he believed that she owed but won only on the principle, and did not receive the money.

===== Miss Annie Horniman =====
Annie Horniman, a British theatre enthusiast and manager, was essential in the creation of the Abbey Theatre, as she was its first significant patron and the woman who offered the edifice in which it would later be established. She was first brought in by Yeats as a costume designer for his play The King's Threshold, as she greatly loved his art and it was also a way for him to get closer to her. Yeats's long relationship with her and her love for theatre made her more likely to accept to become a permanent patron and, by 1901, her money was secured. Her support was so important that he already had a role for her in the Abbey Theatre before it was even created. However, by the time the ITL became the INTS, Yeats had to assure her that her money would not be used to fund a Nationalist rebellion.

She supported him as well as the INTS with financial support as she came from a rich family and, in 1903, after Yeats eloquently declared his apolitical theatrical ideals, she offered to give him a theatre in Dublin worth thirteen thousand pounds, but for the deal to work, she had strict conditions. Firstly, she requested that his speech, essays on the "Irish National Theatre," and her offer be made public. Secondly, the point she stressed most, there were to be no politics at all. She finally gave the building for the Abbey Theatre in 1904, but remained the owner. Yeats accepted her terms but Gregory and Synge worked on finding ways to finesse their way around them before officially accepting. She didn't want to have anything to do with Irish politics, especially not nationalism, and was very reactive to anything she saw as political, which caused several inflammatory feuds with her colleagues. She also did not care for the accessibility of theatre, which was an important issue for the founders, and she created additional rules for ticket pricing, and made the Abbey Theatre one of the most expensive theatres in Dublin. From then, she became the manager of the Abbey Theatre. Over the years, she put many times the theatre's value in money back into it in exchange for input on the plays being staged and respect from the company's directors.

She remained involved for a few strenuous years and left in 1907, angrily realizing she couldn't achieve self-expression at the Abbey, but stayed financially involved until 1910. From 1907 to 1909, she turned on the INTS, essentially threatening to close if anything she deemed political was performed, even if the interpretation was debatable. After the riots following Synge's Playboy of the Western World, she fully expressed her hatred for Irish nationalism and patriotism and threatened the Abbey once again, but when Blanco Posnet was presented and the Nationalists were appeased, she made a deal with Yeats and Lady Gregory to sell them the Theatre. The negotiations dragged on and in 1910, when the Abbey stayed open on the day King Edward VII died, Horniman had a final dispute in court with Yeats before leaving the Abbey Theatre for good.

=== Early years ===
In the early years, there were challenges in finding plays by Irish playwrights, so the founders established guidelines for playwrights submitting plays and wrote some plays themselves. The emergence of the theatre, the challenge of finding plays by Irish playwrights, the protests surrounding Playboy of the Western World, and the work of the Irish Theatre were key developments during this time. As one of the first directors of the new Abbey Theatre, Lady Gregory exchanged correspondence with her counterparts W.B Yeats and JM Synge which chronicled the further development of the new Abbey Theatre including themes such as the critical reception of plays, the challenge of balancing state funding and artistic liberty, and the contributions of actors and others supporting the theatre. The theatre staged many plays by authors, including Padraic Colum, George Bernard Shaw, Oliver St John Gogarty, F. R. Higgins, Thomas MacDonagh, Lord Dunsany, T. C. Murray, James Cousins and Lennox Robinson.

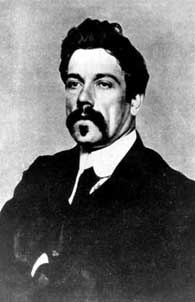
John Millington Synge, author of The Playboy of the Western World, which caused riots at the Abbey on the play's opening night

The Abbey's fortunes worsened in January 1907 when the opening of Synge's The Playboy of the Western World resulted in civil disturbance. The troubles (since known as the Playboy Riots) were encouraged, in part, by nationalists who believed the theatre was insufficiently political and who took offence at Synge's use of the word 'shift', as it was known at the time as a symbol representing Kitty O'Shea and adultery, and hence was seen as a slight on the virtue of Irish womanhood. Much of the crowd rioted loudly, and the actors performed the remainder of the play in dumbshow. The theatre's decision to call in the police further roused the anger of the nationalists. Although press opinion soon turned against the rioters and the protests faded, the management of the Abbey was shaken. They chose not to stage Synge's next—and last completed—play, The Tinker's Wedding (1908), for fear of further disturbances. That same year, the Fay brothers' association with the theatre ended when they emigrated to the United States due to a clash with Yeats's outlook; Lennox Robinson took over the Abbey's day-to-day management after Horniman withdrew financial support.

In 1909, Shaw's The Shewing-Up of Blanco Posnet led to further protests. The subsequent discussion occupied a full issue of the theatre's journal The Arrow. Also that year, the proprietors decided to make the Abbey independent of Annie Horniman, who had indicated a preference for this course. Relations with Horniman had been tense, partly because she wished to be involved in choosing which plays were to be performed and when. As a mark of respect for the death of King Edward VII, an understanding existed that Dublin theatres were to close on the night of 7 May 1910. Robinson, however, kept the Abbey open. When Horniman heard of Robinson's decision, she severed her connections with the company. By her own estimate, she had invested £10,350—worth approximately $1 million in 2007 US dollars—on the project.

With the loss of Horniman, Synge, and the Fays, the Abbey under Robinson tended to drift, suffering from falling public interest and box office returns. This trend was halted for a time by the emergence of Seán O'Casey as an heir to Synge. O'Casey's career as a dramatist began with The Shadow of a Gunman, staged by the Abbey in 1923. This was followed by Juno and the Paycock in 1924, and The Plough and the Stars in 1926. Theatregoers arose in riots over the last play, in a way reminiscent of those that had greeted the Playboy 19 years earlier. Concerned about public reaction, the Abbey rejected O'Casey's next play. He emigrated to London shortly thereafter.

World War I and the Irish Rebellion of 1916 almost ended the theatre; however, in 1924, Yeats and Lady Gregory offered the Abbey to the government of the Free State as a gift to the Irish people. Although the government refused, the following year Minister of Finance Ernest Blythe arranged an annual government subsidy of £850 for the Abbey. This made the company the first state-supported theatre in the English-speaking world. The subsidy allowed the theatre to avoid bankruptcy, but the amount was too small to rescue it from financial difficulty.

==== Affiliated schools ====
The Abbey School of Acting was set up in 1911. The Abbey School of Ballet was established in 1927 by Ninette de Valois – who had provided choreography for a number of Yeats' plays – and ran until 1933.

==== The Peacock and the Gate ====
Around this time the company acquired additional space, allowing them to create a small experimental theatre, the Peacock, on the ground floor of the main theatre. In 1928, Hilton Edwards, Micheál MacLiammoir, cabaret impresario Daisy Bannard Cogley and Gearóid Ó Lochlainn launched the Gate Theatre Studio, leasing the Peacock from 14 October and using the venue to stage works by European and American dramatists.

The Gate also sought work from new Irish playwrights and moved to its own premises in 1930. Despite the Peacock space, the Abbey itself entered a period of artistic decline. This is illustrated by the story of how one new work was said to have come to the Gate Theatre. Denis Johnston reportedly submitted his first play, Shadowdance, to the Abbey; however, Lady Gregory rejected it, returning it to the author with "The Old Lady says No" written across the title page. Johnston decided to re-title the play. The Gate staged The Old Lady Says 'No' in The Peacock in 1928. (Note: academic critics Joseph Ronsley and Christine St. Peter have questioned the veracity of this story.)

== 1930s to 1950s ==
The tradition of the Abbey as primarily a writers' theatre survived Yeats' withdrawal from day-to-day involvement. Frank O'Connor sat on the board from 1935 to 1939, served as managing director from 1937, and had two plays staged during this period. He was alienated from and unable to cope with many of the other board members. They held O'Connor's past adultery against him. Although he fought formidably to retain his position, soon after Yeats died the board began machinations to remove O'Connor. In 1941 Ernest Blythe, a politician, who had arranged the first State subsidy for the theatre, became managing director.

During the 1940s and 1950s, there was a steady decline in the number of new productions. There were 104 new plays produced from 1930 to 1940, whereas this number dropped to 62 for 1940–1950. Thereafter, there was another decrease. However, the theatre was undeterred by the dwindling amount of productions of original plays and had their audience numbers increase. The attitude of the general public had vastly changed towards the Abbey since the beginning of the century. It was no longer reserved as a theatre for the rich and for a small clique of intellectuals, it had become a theatre for the people. The plays of O'Casey and Lennox Robinson that were being produced by theatre at the time most likely aided in this shift. Larger audiences also brought a change in the Abbey's repertory policy. Rather than the theatre's old system of limiting the initial run of a new play to a week, no matter how popular the play became, the Abbey ran their new plays until their audience was exhausted. This change in policy which was brought about partly because of the shortage of new plays was to have serious consequences in future years when the Abbey found its stock of popular revivals exhausted.

During the 1940s and 1950s, the staple fare at the Abbey was a comic farce set in the idealised peasant world of Éamon de Valera. If such a world had ever existed, it was no longer considered relevant by most Irish citizens, and as a result, audience numbers continued to decline. This drift might have been more dramatic but popular actors, including F. J. McCormick, and dramatists, including George Shiels, could still draw a crowd. Austin Clarke staged events for his Dublin Verse Speaking Society—later the Lyric Theatre—at the Peacock from 1941 to 1944 and the Abbey from 1944 to 1951. Long-time servant Nellie Bushell left service as an usher in 1948.

== 1950s to 1990s ==
On 17 July 1951, a fire damaged the Abbey Theatre, with only the Peacock remaining intact. It is often recounted that the building was destroyed in the fire, but Frank MacDonald contends this is an overstatement, citing the continued use of the building by the Irish Academy of Letters until its eventual demolition in 1960. The company leased the old Queen's Theatre in September and continued in residence there until 1966.

The board had plans for rebuilding with a design by the Irish architect Michael Scott which dated back to 1959. The magazine, the Irish Builder, argued that it was favourable to refurbish the old building rather than build a new one, as "we feel the tourists who come here would prefer to see the old Abbey of Yeats and Synge, rather than the Abbey of Scott." On 3 September 1963, the President of Ireland, Éamon de Valera, laid the foundation stone for the new theatre, and the Abbey reopened on 18 July 1966. The cost of the new building was £725,000, an overspend on the original estimated £235,000, and resulted in the Dáil Committee for Public Accounts calling for an investigation into the overrun.

A new building, a new generation of dramatists, including such figures as Hugh Leonard, Brian Friel and Tom Murphy, and tourism that included the National Theatre as a key cultural attraction, helped revive the theatre. Beginning in 1957, the theatre's participation in the Dublin Theatre Festival aided its revival. Plays such as Brian Friel's Philadelphia Here I Come! (1964), Faith Healer (1979) and Dancing at Lughnasa (1990); Tom Murphy's A Whistle in the Dark (1961) and The Gigli Concert (1983); and Hugh Leonard's Da (1973) and A Life (1980), helped raise the Abbey's international profile through successful runs in the West End in London, and on Broadway in New York City.

Irish American writer and W.B Yeats scholar James W. Flannery (born 1936) wrote two books about the Abbey Theatre: W. B. Yeats and the Idea of a Theatre: The Early Abbey Theatre in Theory and in Practice (1976) and Miss Horniman and the Abbey Theatre (1970). Flannery was the executive director of the Yeats International Theatre Festival held at the Abbey Theatre from 1989 to 1993.

== Challenges in the 2000s ==
In December 2004 the theatre celebrated its centenary with events that included performances of the original programme by amateur dramatic groups and a production of Michael West's Dublin By Lamplight, originally staged by Annie Ryan for The Corn Exchange company at the Project Arts Centre in November 2004. Despite the centenary, not all was well: audience numbers were falling, the Peacock was closed for lack of money, the theatre was near bankruptcy, and the staff felt the threat of huge lay-offs.

In September 2004 two members of the theatre's advisory council, playwrights Jimmy Murphy and Ulick O'Connor, tabled a "motion of no confidence" in Artistic Director Ben Barnes, and criticised him for touring with a play in Australia during the deep financial and artistic crisis at home. Barnes returned and temporarily held his position. The debacle put the Abbey under great public scrutiny. On 12 May 2005, Barnes and managing director Brian Jackson resigned after it was found that the theatre's deficit of €1.85 million had been underestimated. The new director, Fiach Mac Conghail, due to start in January 2006, took over in May 2005.

== Reestablishment ==
On 20 August 2005, the Abbey Theatre's Advisory Council approved a plan to dissolve the Abbey's owner, the National Theatre Society, and replace it with a company limited by guarantee, the Abbey Theatre Limited. After strong debate, the board accepted the proposal. Basing its actions on this plan, the Arts Council of Ireland awarded the Abbey €25.7 million in January 2006 to be spread over three years. The grant represented an approximate 43 per cent increase in the Abbey's revenues and was the largest ever awarded by the Arts Council. The new company was established on 1 February 2006, with the announcement of a new Abbey Board chaired by High Court Judge Bryan McMahon. In March 2007 the larger auditorium in the theatre was radically reconfigured by Jean-Guy Lecat as part of a major upgrade of the theatre.

In 2009, the Literary Department announced the pilot of a new development initiative, the New Playwrights Programme. The six writers who took part in this pilot programme were Aidan Harney, Lisa Keogh, Shona McCarthy, Jody O'Neill, Neil Sharpson and Lisa Tierney-Keogh.

More than 30 writers were commissioned by the Abbey after Mac Conghail was appointed director in May 2005, and the Abbey produced new plays by Tom Murphy, Richard Dormer, Gary Duggan, Billy Roche, Bernard Farrell and Owen McCafferty. The Abbey also developed a relationship with the Public Theater in New York, where it has presented two new plays: Terminus by Mark O'Rowe and Sam Shepard's Kicking a Dead Horse. The Abbey also made a historic move in 2009/10 by producing four consecutive new plays by women writers: B for Baby by Carmel Winter, No Romance by Nancy Harris, Perve by Stacey Gregg and 16 Possible Glimpses by Marina Carr.

The Abbey ran a special programme, Waking the Nation, to commemorate the Easter Rising of 1916. Some controversy arose over the fact that of ten productions, only one, a monologue for children, was by a female playwright.

The lack of works written by women led to a public outcry in the Irish media.

One academic, Dr Brenda Donohue, found that 11% of the plays produced by the Abbey Theatre on either the main stage or Peacock stage were written by women between 1995 and 2014. 36 plays (12 of which were revivals) out of 320 produced in that time period were written by women.

The Abbey Theatre's large gender disparity in its centenary year led to #WakingTheFeminsts movement, a year-long grassroot campaign for gender equality in Irish theatre. Research commissioned by #WakingTheFeminsts and funded by the Arts Council analysed gender in Irish theatre between 2006 and 2015. The research found that with the exception of costume designers, women were underrepresented in every category of theatre production (directors, authors, cast, set designers, lighting designers and sound designers). The 4 highest-funded organisations in Irish theatre had the lower female representation. The Abbey Theatre receives significantly more funding than any other theatre in the county. In 2016, The Abbey Theatre committed to greater gender equality.

As a direct response to the Waking the Nation announcement in 2015, Waking The Feminists is seen as having a lasting legacy on gender equality in Irish theatre, not just the Abbey. A book and a documentary have been produced detailing the impact of #WakingTheFeminists.

== Co-directors and new building plans ==
In 2016, the Abbey's direction passed to two co-directors on five-year contracts. Neil Murray from Wales and Graham McLaren from Scotland pursued policies involving significant touring, a wider selection of plays including shorter runs, reduced reliance on Abbey stalwarts such as The Plough and the Stars (57 productions in the theatre's history), free previews, and an emphasis on diversity. They also pursued the project to renew the theatre building, with McLaren describing the current structure as "the worst theatre building I have ever worked in ... Stalinesque ... a terrible, terrible design". Murray and McLaren were later criticised for governance issues at the Abbey during their tenure with the publication of the Crowe Report. These included "unclear" governance and "significant failure" in record keeping. The Abbey said it accepted the report.

After discussions about new locations in the Docklands, on O'Connell Street and elsewhere, it was decided to redevelop the Abbey in situ. Hence, in September 2012, the Abbey Theatre purchased 15-17 Eden Quay, and in 2016, 22-23 Eden Quay. With a budget of up to 80 million euros mentioned, including capital funding from the central government, the plan is to remove the existing building and build on the combined site, creating two new theatre spaces, of 700 and 250 seats, along with a restaurant, modern rehearsal spaces, and new offices. The new theatre would open onto the Liffey quays. As of March 2023, the plans for the redevelopment had not yet been finalised and an application for planning permission had not yet been submitted.

In February 2021, after open competition, two new co-directors were appointed, Caitriona McLaughlin as artistic director and Mark O'Brien as executive director. Their contracts were renewed for another 5-year term each in May 2026.

During the summer of 2024, the theatre was shut for nearly two months at the height of busy season, for reasons not fully clarified but involving some refurbishment. Box office revenue at the Abbey fell in 2024, and the theatre staged 11 fewer productions than it had in 2023. Occupancy levels at the theatre also fell between 2023 and 2024.

== Bibliography ==
- Fitz-Simon, Christopher. The Abbey Theatre—Ireland's National Theatre: The First 100 Years. New York: Thames and Hudson, 2003. ISBN 0-500-28426-1
- Foster, R. F. W. B. Yeats: A Life, Vol. II: The Arch-Poet 1915–1939. New York: Oxford University Press, 2003. ISBN 0-19-818465-4.
- Frazier, Adrian. Behind the Scenes: Yeats, Horniman, and the Struggle for the Abbey Theatre. Berkeley: University of California, March 1990. ISBN 0-520-06549-2
- Gregory, Lady Augusta. Our Irish Theatre. New York and London: Knickerbocker Press, 1913.
- Grene, Nicholas. The Politics of Irish Drama: Plays in Context from Boucicault to Friel. Cambridge University Press, February 1999. ISBN 0-521-66536-1
- Hogan, Robert, and Richard Burnham. Modern Irish Drama: A Documentary History. Vols. I-VI..
- Hunt, Hugh. The Abbey: Ireland's National Theater, 1904–1979. New York: Columbia University Press, October 1979. ISBN 0-231-04906-4
- Igoe, Vivien. A Literary Guide to Dublin. Methuen, April 1995. ISBN 0-413-69120-9
- Kavanagh, Peter. The Story of the Abbey Theatre. New York: Devin-Adair, 1950.
- Kilroy, James. The "Playboy" Riots. Dublin: Dolmen Pres, 1971. ASIN: B000LNLIXO
- McGlone, James P. Ria Mooney: The Life and Times of the Artistic Director of the Abbey Theatre. McFarland and Company, February 2002. ISBN 0-7864-1251-8
- Robinson, Lennox. Ireland's Abbey Theatre. London: Sidgwick and Jackson, 1951.
- Ryan, Philip B. The Lost Theatres of Dublin. The Badger Press, September 1998. ISBN 0-9526076-1-1
- Welch, Robert. The Abbey Theatre, 1899–1999: Form and Pressure. Oxford: Oxford University Press, February 1999. ISBN 0-19-926135-0
