= Irish Literary Theatre =

Irish theatrical project (1899–1901)

The Irish Literary Theatre was a short-lived theatrical project that existed from 1899 to 1901. Its purpose was to establish a national stage for Irish plays performed by Irish performers to amplify the Irish cultural identity (apart from Great Britain) and encourage authors to write works of serious depth. It was founded by W. B. Yeats, Lady Gregory, George Moore and Edward Martyn as part of the Irish Literary Revival and it was centered in Dublin.

Productions included The Countess Cathleen, The Heather Field, Maeve, The Last Feast of Fianna and The Bending of the Bough.

Although it crumbled due to monetary instability, it laid the groundwork for what would become the Abbey Theatre.

== History ==
W. B. Yeats, Lady Gregory, and Edward Martyn published a "manifesto for Irish Literary Theatre" in 1897, in which they proclaimed their intention of establishing a national theatre for Ireland.

In 1899 Lady Gregory secured a temporary licence for a play to be given at the Antient Concert Rooms in Great Brunswick St in Dublin, and so enabled the Irish Literary Theatre to give its first production. The play chosen was The Countess Cathleen by W. B. Yeats. It was done by a very efficient London company that included May Whitty (Dame May Webster) and Ben Webster. The next production given was Edwards Martyn's play The Heather Field.

In the following year the Irish Literary Theatre produced three plays at the Gaiety Theatre: Maeve by Edward Martyn, The Last Feast of Fianna by Alice Milligan, and The Bending of the Bough by George Moore. The Bending of the Bough was staged during the Second Boer War which begun on 11 October 1899.

The Irish Literary Theatre project lasted until 1901, when it collapsed due to lack of funding.

The use of non-Irish actors in these productions was perceived to be a failure, and a new group of Irish players was put together by the Fay brothers. These went on to form the Irish National Theatre Society, which led to the Abbey Theatre.

== See also ==
- Abbey Theatre
- Ulster Literary Theatre
