= T. C. Murray =

Irish dramatist

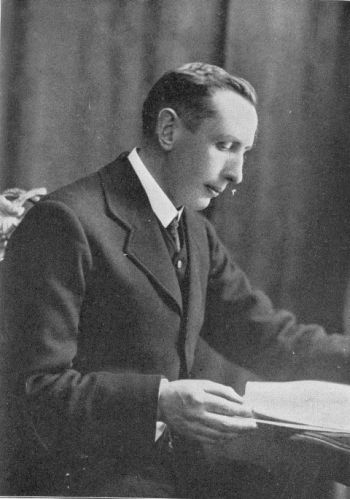
T. C. Murray

Thomas Cornelius Murray (17 January 1873 – 7 March 1959) was an Irish dramatist who was closely associated with the Abbey Theatre. He was born in Macroom, County Cork, and educated at St Patrick's Teacher Training College in Drumcondra, Dublin. He worked as a schoolteacher and in 1900 was appointed headmaster of the national school in Rathduff, Co. Cork. His first play, The Wheel of Fortune, was produced by the Little Theatre in Cork in 1909. It was revised and renamed Sovereign Love in 1913. Murray had co-founded the theatre with Daniel Corkery, Con O'Leary and Terence McSwiney. In 1915, he moved to Dublin as headmaster of the Model Schools at Inchicore, where he remained until his retirement from teaching in 1932.

His play Birthright was performed in the Abbey Theatre in 1910 and established him as a writer of force. In all, he wrote 15 plays, all of which were produced by the Abbey. His two most highly regarded works are Maurice Harte (1912) and Autumn Fire (1924). Both of these and Birthright were performed in New York on Broadway, with Autumn Fire having a run of 71 performances. Murray also wrote an autobiographical novel Spring Horizon (1937).

With regard to the character of Murray's plays and their writerly impact, Sean O'Casey according to Patrick Maume told Joseph Holloway how "he didn't like to watch Murray's plays because their unrelieved tragedy affected him too deeply; he inserted numerous humorous touches into his own plays as a result". Maume cites Daniel Corkery comparing their different styles "...how Murray often achieves a kind of hidden tension -the very stuff of drama- that Synge only rarely reached and Sean O'Casey knows nothing of". Maume cites the example of Murray's early play 'Maurice Harte' wherein "a clerical student who lacks a vocation is driven mad by the pressure of family expectations".

It has been stated both by A. DeGiacomo and by R. Allen Cave that, in the Art competitions at the 1924 Olympics in Paris, France, Murray was awarded a bronze medal for his play Birthright. However, according to the official record for the games, although Murray was a participant in the literature category with this play and also with Maurice Harte he did not win a medal.

Birthright was staged at the Finborough Theatre in London in 2023, its first staging in London in 90 years.

== Plays ==
- The Wheel of Fortune 1909.
- Birthright (two acts) 1910.
- Maurice Harte (two acts) 1912.
- Sovereign Love (one act) 1913.
- The Briery Gap (one act) 1917.
- Spring (one act) 1918.
- The Serf 1920.
- Aftermath (three acts) 1922.
- Autumn Fire (three acts) 1924.
- The Pipe in the Fields (one act) 1927.
- The Blind Wolf 1928.
- A Flutter of Wings 1930.
- Michaelmas Eve (three acts) 1932.
- A Spot in the Sun 1938.
- Illumination (two acts) 1939.
