= Frank Fay (Irish actor) =

Irish actor (1870–1931)

Francis John Fay (30 August 1870 – 2 January 1931), older brother of William Fay, was an actor and co-founder of the Abbey Theatre in Dublin, Ireland. He worked with his brother, William, staging productions in halls around the city. In 1902 the two brothers joined the Irish Literary Theatre. Finally, they formed W. G. Fay's Irish National Dramatic Company, focused on the development of Irish acting talent.

The brothers participated in the founding of the Abbey Theatre and were largely responsible for evolving the Abbey style of acting. After a falling-out with the Abbey directors in 1908, they emigrated to the United States and produced Irish plays there.

In 1921, he retired to Dublin, where he taught elocution and directing plays in local colleges.
