= William Fay =

Irish actor (1872–1947)

W.G. Fay: self-portrait

William George Fay (12 November 1872 – 27 October 1947) was an actor and theatre producer who was one of the co-founders of the Abbey Theatre.

Fay was born in Dublin, where he attended Belvedere College. He worked for a time in the 1890s with a touring theatre company in Ireland, Scotland, and Wales. When he returned to Dublin, he worked with his older brother Frank, staging productions in halls around the city. Finally, they formed W. G. Fay's Irish National Dramatic Company, focused on the development of Irish acting talent. The brothers participated in founding the Abbey Theatre and were largely responsible for evolving the Abbey style of acting. After a falling-out with the Abbey directors in 1908, the brothers emigrated to the United States to work in theatre there.

He moved to London in 1914, working as an actor on stage and in films.

He played Johnnie, in the film, Spellbound (1941 film). One of his most notable film roles was as Father Tom in Carol Reed's Belfast-set Odd Man Out (1947), whose cast was dense with actors from the Abbey Theatre. His memoir, The Fays of the Abbey Theatre, appeared in 1935. Willie Fay died in London in 1947, aged 74.

== Filmography ==
Year	Title	Role	Notes
1933	The Blarney Stone	The Leader	
1934	General John Regan	Golligher	
1937	Storm in a Teacup	Michael Cassidy	
1937	The Last Curtain	Milligan	
1941	Spring Meeting	Johnny Mahoney	
1941	This Man Is Dangerous	Mr. Eslick	
1941	Spellbound	Johnny	
1946	London Town	Mike	
1947	Odd Man Out	Father Tom	
1947	Temptation Harbour	Night Porter	Uncredited
1948	Oliver Twist	Bookseller	(final film role)

== Bibliography ==
- Igoe, Vivien. A Literary Guide to Dublin. (Methuen, 1994) ISBN 0-413-69120-9
- Ryan, Philip B. The Lost Theatres of Dublin. (The Badger Press, 1998) ISBN 0-9526076-1-1
- "Fay, William George" . Thom's Irish Who's Who . Dublin: Alexander Thom and Son Ltd. 1923. p. 77 – via Wikisource.
