= Frederick Ryan =

Irish playwright, journalist and socialist

Frederick Ryan (12 October 1873 – April 1913), was an Irish, Dublin-born playwright, journalist and socialist.

== Career ==
Ryan became secretary of the Irish National Theatre Society in 1902. There he would create realistic satire with the play The Laying of the Foundations. He was a member of the Celtic Literature Society and frequently wrote on political issues. He was co-editor along with William Kirkpatrick Magee of the Irish journal Dana from May 1904 until April 1905.

Ryan joined James Connolly’s Irish Socialist Republican Party, and would become the national secretary of the Socialist Party of Ireland. He was also a member of the Young Irelanders branch of the United Irish League.

He lived in Cairo as editor of the Egyptian Standard, from 1907 to 1909, then was organiser for the Irish Socialist Party. He edited Wilfrid Scawen Blunt’s Egypt in London. He died in Blunt's house of appendicitis in 1913.
