= James Cousins =

Irish writer, poet, & playwright (1873–1956)

James Henry Cousins
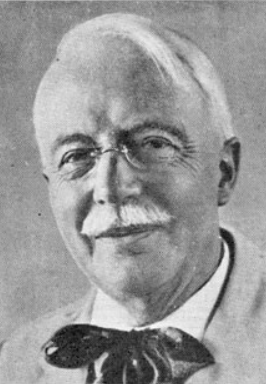
- Born: James Henry Sproull Cousins; 22 July 1873; Belfast, Ireland
- Died: 20 February 1956 (aged 82); Madanapalle, Andhra Pradesh, India
- Other name: Jayaram
- Occupations: Writer; poet; playwright; teacher
- Spouse: Margaret Cousins (m. 1903; died 1954)
- Writing career
- Pen name: Mac Oisín

James Henry Cousins (22 July 1873 – 20 February 1956) was an Irish-Indian writer, poet, playwright, teacher, Theosophist and convert to Hinduism.

== Early life and education ==
James Henry Sproull Cousins was born on 22 July 1873 in Belfast, Ireland to James Cousins, a mariner, and Susan Cousins (née Davis). The Cousins family were Wesleyan Methodist and of Huguenot descent. Cousins attended national school until the age of 12–13, before studying shorthand and typing at Belfast Mercantile Academy.

== Career ==
In 1886, Cousins began working an as errand boy to a pawnbroker and later became the private secretary and speech-writer to Sir Daniel Dixon, 1st Baronet, the Lord Mayor of Belfast.

Cousins joined the Gaelic League (present-day Conradh na Gaeilge) and published his first poem Ben Madighan in 1894. In 1897, Cousins moved to Dublin where he became part of a literary circle which included William Butler Yeats, George William Russell and James Joyce. He is believed to have served as a model for the Little Chandler character in Joyce's short story collection Dubliners. Cousins was significantly influenced by Russell's ability to reconcile mysticism with a pragmatic approach to social reforms and by the teachings of Madame Blavatsky. He had a lifelong interest in the paranormal and acted as reporter in several experiments carried out by William Fletcher Barrett, Professor of physics at Trinity College Dublin and one of the founders of the Society for Psychical Research. Cousins worked as a teacher in The High School, Dublin.

Cousins produced several books of poetry whilst in Ireland as well as acting in the first production of Cathleen Ní Houlihan (under the stage name of H. Sproule) with the famous Irish revolutionary and beauty Maud Gonne in the title role. His plays were produced in the first years of the twentieth century in the Abbey Theatre, the most famous being "the Racing Lug". After a dispute with W. B. Yeats, who objected to 'too much Cousins' the Irish National Theatre movement split with two-thirds of the actors and writers siding with Cousins against Yeats. He also wrote widely on the subject of Theosophy and in 1915 travelled to India with the voyage fees paid for by Annie Besant the President of the Theosophical Society. He spent most of the rest of his life in the sub-continent, apart from a year as Professor of English Literature at Keio University in Tokyo and another lecturing in New York. He formally converted to Hinduism in 1937. At the core of Cousins's engagement with Indian culture was a firm belief in the "shared sensibilities between Celtic and Oriental peoples".

Whilst in India he became friendly with many key Indian personalities including the poet Rabindranath Tagore, the Indian classical dancer Rukmini Devi Arundale, the painter Abdur Rahman Chughtai and Mahatma Gandhi. He gave the William Miller Memorial Lectures at Madras in 1938 on "The Idea, Expression, and Fulfillment of Beauty," and he was the person who brought change into the life of poetry of the Great Renowned Kannada Poet and Writer Kuvempu. He wrote a joint autobiography with his wife Margaret Elizabeth Cousins (formerly Gretta Gillespie), a suffragette and one of the co-founders of the Irish Women's Franchise League and All India Women's Conference (AIWC).

In his The Future Poetry Sri Aurobindo has acclaimed Cousins' New Ways in English Literature as "literary criticism which is of the first order, at once discerning and suggestive, criticism which forces us both to see and think." He has also acknowledged that he learnt to intuit deeper, being alerted by Cousins' criticisms of his poems. In 1920 Cousins came to Pondicherry to meet the Mother and Sri Aurobindo. The appreciation is palpable in the following citations:

From The Future Poetry by Sri Aurobindo:

"It will be more fruitful to take the main substance of the matter for which the body of Mr.Cousins' criticism gives a good material. Taking the impression it creates for a starting-point and the trend of English poetry for our main text, but casting our view farther back into the past, we may try to sound what the future has to give us through the medium of the poetic mind and its power for creation and interpretation. The issues of recent activity are still doubtful and it would be rash to make any confident prediction; but there is one possibility which this book strongly suggests and which it is at least interesting and may be fruitful to search and consider. That possibility is the discovery of a closer approximation to what we might call the mantra in poetry that rhythmic speech which, as the Veda puts it, rises at once from the heart of the seer and from the distant home of the Truth, — the discovery of the word, the divine movement, the form of thought proper to the reality which, as Mr. Cousins excellently says,

" lies in the apprehension of a something stable behind the instability of word and deed, something that is reflection of the fundamental passion of humanity for something beyond itself, something that is a dim foreshadowing of the divine urge which is prompting all creation to unfold itself and to rise out of its limitations towards its Godlike possibilities. Poetry in the past has done that in moments of supreme elevation; in the future there seems to be some chance of its making it a more conscious aim and steadfast endeavour."

== Vegetarianism ==
Cousins and wife Margaret were interested in anti-vivisection, theosophy, vegetarianism and women's suffrage. They were both strict vegetarians and in 1905 founded the Irish Vegetarian Society. Cousins lectured on "The Cruelties and Diseases Connected with Flesh-Eating" which was awarded first prize at the Vegetarian Federal Union in June 1907.

== Works ==
- POEMS BY JAMES H. COUSINS

The Oxford Book of English Mystical Verse. Ed. Nicholson & Lee. Oxford: The Clarendon Press, 1917.
Padraic Colum (1881–1972).
Anthology of Irish Verse. 1922.

- BIBLIOGRAPHY

The Legend of the Blemished King and Other Poems (1897)
The Quest (1906)
The Bell-Branch (1908)
The Wisdom of the West (1912)
Etain the Beloved and Other Poems (1912)
The Bases of Theosophy (1913)
The Renaissance in India (1918)
The King's Wife (1919)
Sea-Change (1920)
The Cultural Unity of Asia (1922)
Work and Worship: Essays on Culture and Creative Art (1922)
The New Japan: Impressions and Reflections (with 74 illustrations) (1923)
Heathen Essays (1925)
A Tibetan Banner (1926)
Above the Rainbow and Other Poems (1926)
A Wandering Harp: Selected Poems (1932)
A Bardic Pilgrimage (1934)
Collected Poems (1940)
The Faith Of The Artist. (1941)
The Work Promethean (1970)

- BIOGRAPHIES/CRITICISM

A Wandering Harp: James H. Cousins, a Study. C.N. Mangala. (B.R. Publishing, 1995).
James Henry Cousins: A Study of His Works in the Light of Theosophical Movement. Dilip Kumar Chatterjee. (South Asia Books, 1994).
James Cousins. William A. Dumbleton. (Twayne Publishing, 1980).

- RELATED LINKS

James H. Cousins: Poems – An index of poems.

== See also ==
- List of Irish writers
