= George William Russell =

Irish polymath (1867–1935)

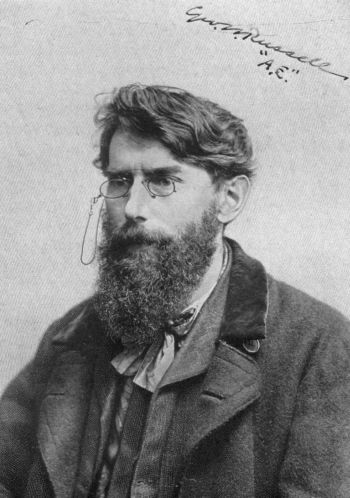
- Born: 10 April 1867; Lurgan, County Armagh, Ireland
- Died: 17 July 1935 (aged 68); Bournemouth, England
- Other names: Æ, AE, A.E.
- Education: Rvd. Edward Power's school, 3 Harrington Street, Dublin
- Alma mater: Metropolitan School of Art
- Occupations: Author, poet, book editor, critic, painter
- Known for: Poetry, painting

George William Russell (10 April 1867 – 17 July 1935), who wrote with the pseudonym Æ (often written AE or A.E.), was an Irish writer, editor, critic, poet, painter and Irish nationalist. He was also a writer on mysticism, and a central figure in the group of devotees of theosophy which met in Dublin for many years.

== Early life ==
Russell was born in Lurgan, County Armagh (not in Portadown as has sometimes been misreported), in Ireland, the second son of Thomas Russell and Mary Armstrong. His father, the son of a small farmer, became an employee of Thomas Bell and Co., a prosperous firm of linen drapers. The family relocated to Dublin, where his father had a new offer of employment, when George was eleven years old. The death of his beloved sister Mary, aged 18, was a blow from which he took a long time to recover.

He was educated at Rathmines School and the Metropolitan School of Art, where he began a lifelong, if sometimes contentious, friendship with W. B. Yeats. In the 1880s, Russell lived at the Theosophical Society lodge at 3, Upper Ely Place, sharing rooms with H. M. Magee, the brother of William Kirkpatrick Magee.

Russell started working as a draper's clerk, then for many years worked for the Irish Agricultural Organisation Society (IAOS), an agricultural co-operative society initiated by Horace Plunkett in 1894. In 1897, Plunkett needed an able organiser and W. B. Yeats suggested Russell, who became Assistant Secretary of the IAOS.

== Family ==
In 1898, he married Violet North; they had two surviving sons, Brian and Diarmuid, as well as a third son who died soon after birth. Frank O'Connor, who was a close friend of Russell in their later years, remarked that his family life was something of a mystery even to those who knew him best: O'Connor noticed that he never spoke about his wife and seemed to be at odds with his sons (although O'Connor himself liked both of them). While his marriage was rumoured to be unhappy, all his friends agreed that Violet's death in 1932 was a great blow to Russell.

== Politician ==
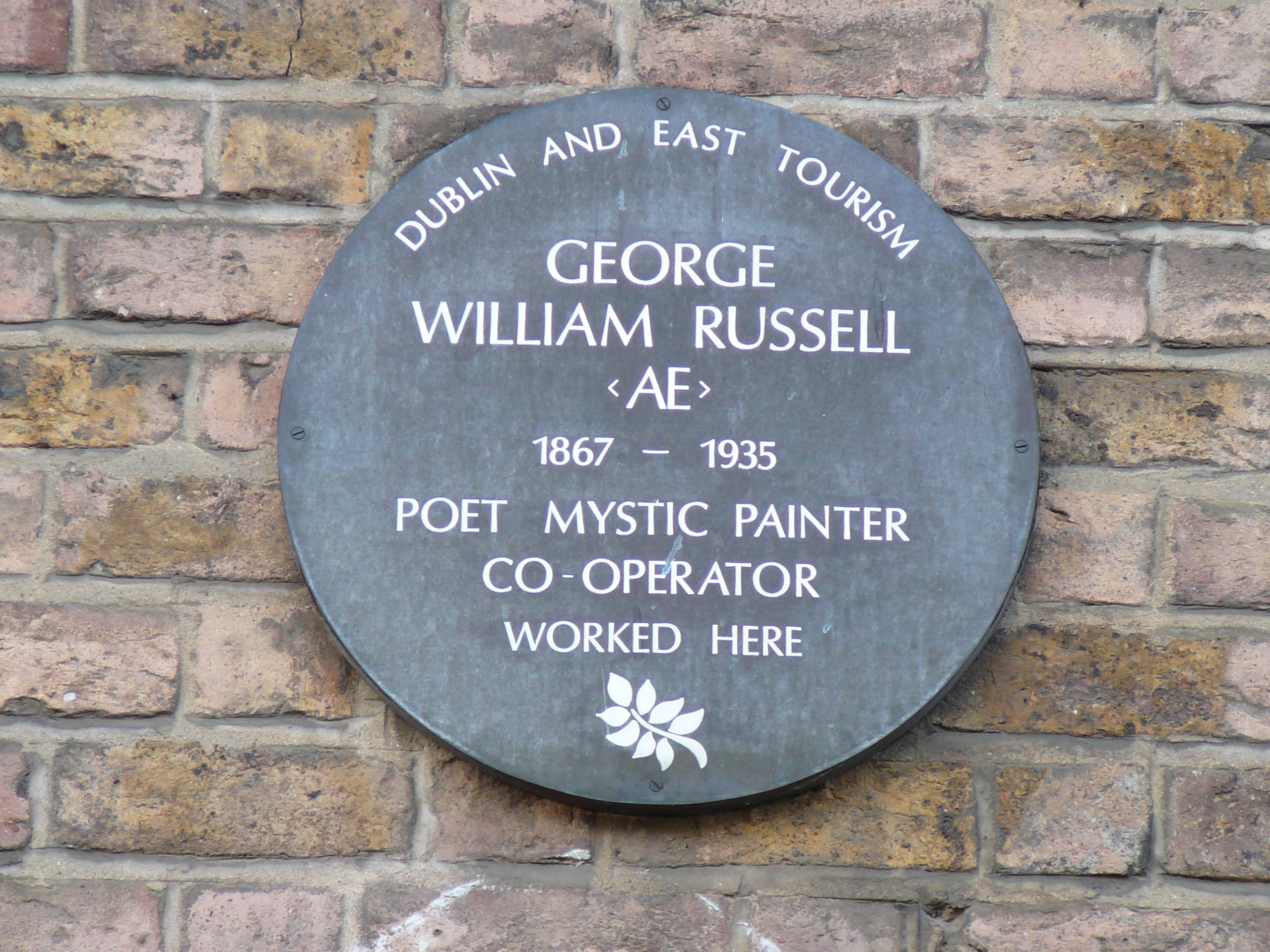
Plaque on 84 Merrion Square, Dublin where Æ once worked (now 'Plunkett House')

He was an able lieutenant to Plunkett, and travelled extensively throughout Ireland as a spokesman for the IAOS; he was mainly responsible for developing the credit societies and establishing Co-operative Banks in the south and west of the country, the numbers of which increased to 234 by 1910. Russell and Plunkett made a good team, with each gaining much from the association with the other.

As an officer of the IAOS, he could not express political opinions freely, but made no secret of the fact that he considered himself a Nationalist.

Russell supported the strikers during the Dublin Lockout, penning an open letter 'To the Masters of Dublin' which was published in Irish newspapers on 7 October 1913. He praised the strikers in a speech at Albert Hall on 1 November as "the true heroes of Ireland today, they are the descendants of Oscar, Cú Chulainn, the heroes of our ancient stories".

Russell definitely sympathized with the Easter Rising and saw it as in line with his views on Goidelic Nationalist "traditional and natural communism", but due to his personal leanings toward pacifism, his individual involvement took the form of editing and writing rather than direct participation in the significantly violent activities that took place.

And yet my spirit rose in pride
Refashioning in burnished gold
The images of those who died
Or were shut up in penal cell
Here's to you Pearse, your dream, not mine
And yet the thought- for this you fell
Has turned life's water into wine.

— from To the memory of some I knew who are dead and loved Ireland (1917)

He was an independent delegate to the 1917–18 Irish Convention in which he opposed John Redmond's compromise on Home Rule. He became involved in the anti-partition Irish Dominion League when Plunkett founded the body in 1919.

== Publisher ==
Russell was editor (from 1905 to 1923) of the Irish Homestead, the journal of the IAOS. His gifts as a writer and publicist gained him a wide influence on the cause of agricultural cooperation. He then became editor of The Irish Statesman, the paper of the Irish Dominion League, which merged with the Irish Homestead, from 15 September 1923 until 12 April 1930.

With the demise of this newspaper, he was for the first time in his adult life without a job, and there were concerns that he could find himself in a state of poverty, as he had never earned very much money from his paintings or books. At one point his son Diarmuid was reduced to selling off early drafts of his father's works to raise money, to the annoyance of Russell, who accused the lad, with whom his relations were not good, of "raiding the wastepaper baskets".

Unbeknownst to him meetings and collections were organized and later that year at Plunkett House he was presented by Father T. Finlay with a cheque for £800. This enabled him to visit the United States the next year, where he was well received all over the country and his books sold in large numbers.

He used the pseudonym "AE", or more properly, "Æ". This derived from an earlier Æon signifying the lifelong quest of man, subsequently abbreviated.

== Writer, artist, patron ==
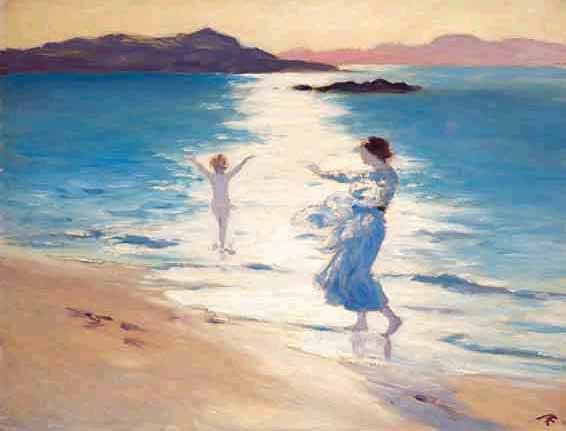
Bathers by Æ (1918)

His first book of poems, Homeward: Songs by the Way (1894), established him in what was known as the Irish Literary Revival, where Æ met the young James Joyce in 1902 and introduced him to other Irish literary figures, including William Butler Yeats. He appears as a character in the "Scylla and Charybdis" episode of Joyce's Ulysses, where he dismisses Stephen's theories on Shakespeare. Dedalus borrows money from him and then remarks: "A.E.I.O.U." His collected poems were published in 1913, with a second edition in 1926.

He designed the famous Starry Plough flag for the Irish Citizen Army which was unveiled on 5 April 1914 and flown during the Easter Rising.

His house at 17 Rathgar Avenue in Dublin became a meeting-place at the time for everyone interested in the economic and artistic future of Ireland: his Sunday evenings "at home" were a notable feature of Dublin literary life. Michael Collins, the effective leader of the new Government, became acquainted with Russell in the last months of his life: Oliver St. John Gogarty, a regular guest at Russell's Sundays "at home" believed that these two men, so utterly unalike in most ways, nonetheless developed a deep mutual respect.

Russell's generosity and hospitality were legendary: Frank O'Connor fondly recalled "the warmth and kindness, which enfolded you like an old fur coat". He was the most loyal of friends, and in the notoriously fractious Dublin literary world Russell tried to keep the peace between his endlessly quarrelling colleagues: even the abrasive Seumas O'Sullivan could be forgiven a great deal, simply because "Seamus drinks too much". His interests were wide-ranging; he became a theosophist and wrote extensively on politics and economics, while continuing to paint and write poetry. Æ claimed to be a clairvoyant, able to view various kinds of spiritual beings, which he illustrated in paintings and drawings.

He was noted for his exceptional kindness and generosity towards younger writers: Frank O'Connor termed him "the man who was the father to three generations of Irish writers", and Patrick Kavanagh called him "a great and holy man". P. L. Travers, famous as the creator of Mary Poppins, was yet another writer who gratefully recalled Russell's help and encouragement. He features, scandalously, in Chapter 13 of Anthony Burgess' novel Earthly Powers.

== Visions and beliefs ==
Russell reported seeing visions since when he was a young man, including one in which it was revealed to him a new name: Aeon, which he would only later find meaning in quotes he was unaware of. In another one, as described in Song and its Fountains:

Earth revealed itself to me as a living being, and rock and clay were made transparent so that I saw lovelier and lordlier beings than I had known before, and was made partner in memory of mighty things, happenings in ages long sunken behind time.

The visions intensified at age 17, around the time he began his friendship with Yeats. As he writes in The Candle of the Vision:

But the luminous quality gradually became normal in me, and at times in meditation there broke in on me an almost intolerable lustre of light, pure and shining faces, dazzling processions of figures, most ancient, ancient places and peoples, and landscapes lovely as the lost Eden. These appeared at first to have no more relation to myself than images from a street without one sees reflected in a glass; but at times meditation prolonged itself into spheres which were radiant with actuality.

While students, he and Yeats were members of the Hermetic Society founded by Charles Johnston and were interested in Theosophy. Johnston founded the Dublin Lodge of the Theosophical Society in 1886, and Russell would become a member of it in 1890. In Song and its Fountains, he speculates on the nature of the soul based on his experiences:

Looking back on the past I have a vivid sense of a being seeking reincarnation here, beginning with those faint first intuitions of beauty, and those early dreamings which were its forerunners. It was no angelic thing, pure and new from a foundry of souls, which sought embodiment, but a being stained with the dust and conflict of a long travel through time, carrying with it unsated desires, base and august and as I divined it, myriads of perceptions and a secret wisdom. It was not simple but infinitely complex, as a being must be which has been in many worlds and all it had experienced has become part of it. If there was an original purity of being it had become corrupted, yet not altogether for there was in it, I believe, some incorruptible spiritual atom, carrying with it maybe some perception of its journeyings with deity. It had worshipped in many houses of prayer and kept the reverence it had paid and had been in many a gay and many a ruined heart. Out of ancient happiness it could build intoxicating images of life, and out of ancient sorrows it could evoke a desolating wisdom that would crucify the infant joy ere it could run to its light.

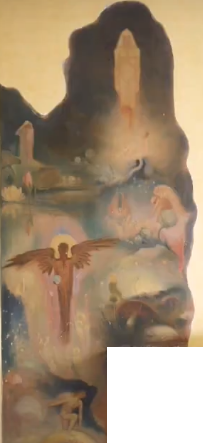
Theosophist mural painted by Russell and Yeats, in the drawing room at 3 Ely Place, Dublin, former meeting place of the Theosophical Society. The painting shows nature spirits among a heavenly Deva (above) and a kneeling man over a terrestrial globe (below). Between them, a winged angelic being might represent an Augoeides or Yeats' daimon.

He gave various explanations for his visionary memories: they could be from past lives; modified memories; symbolic dreams; moments experienced by other beings who had some affinity with him; Akashic records (according to his belief in the Theosophist doctrine); telepathy and visions of remote places. He claimed that all these occurred to him, and that he could distinguish them by certain signs. He also believed that the deities of all civilizations were archetypes or thought-forms created by the collective mind, but relatively real, and he had visions of some in Ireland:

apparitions of light taller than human, riding on winged horses, or shining musicians circled by dazzling birds, or queens bearing branches with blossoms of light or fruit from the world of immortal youth, all moving in a divine aether. These were messengers of the gods and through these came about that marriage of Heaven and Earth in our literature which made it for long centuries seem almost the utterance of a single voice. These divine visitations have been the dominant influence in our literature so that our poets have sung of their country as the shadow of Heaven.

He claimed to see nature spirits and made paintings about them, such as the sídhe, elven or faerie beings in Irish folklore. On one occasion, he showed some drawings he had made of them to a peasant, who would have pointed out that he had already seen many of those entities. In 1889 he had traveled with W. B. Yeats to a town in County Galway, where Russell also painted these spirit beings, and a Druid is said to have appeared to them in vision. The previous year, in a letter to Yeats, Russell had stated:

The gods have returned to Erin and have centred themselves in the sacred mountains and blow the fires through the country. They have been seen by several in vision, they will awaken the magical instinct everywhere, and the universal heart of the people will turn to the old druidic beliefs. I note through the country the increased faith in faery things. The bells are heard from the mounds and sounding in the hollows of the mountains. A purple sheen in the inner air, perceptible at times in the light of day, spreads itself over the mountains. All this I can add my own testimony to. Furthermore, we were told that though now few we would soon be many, and that a branch of the school for the revival of the ancient mysteries to teach real things would be formed here soon. Out of Ireland will arise a light to transform many ages and peoples. There is a hurrying of forces and swift things going out and I believe profoundly that a new Avatar is about to appear and in all spheres the forerunners go before him to prepare. It will be one of the kingly Avatars, who is at once ruler of men and magic sage. I had a vision of him some months ago and will know him if he appears.

George told friends of glimpses of past existences he had had, in Assyria, Pre-Columbian America, as a contemporary of William Blake and also, as he told Lady Constance Sitwell, of "brief but very vivid, of Druidic times in Ireland; of a Spanish life―riding into a walled town and fighting; one Egyptian period, and very, very far back, a life in India". In a conversation with Julian Huxley, he asked him about where his memories would have come from, and the biologist did not know how to respond to his argument.

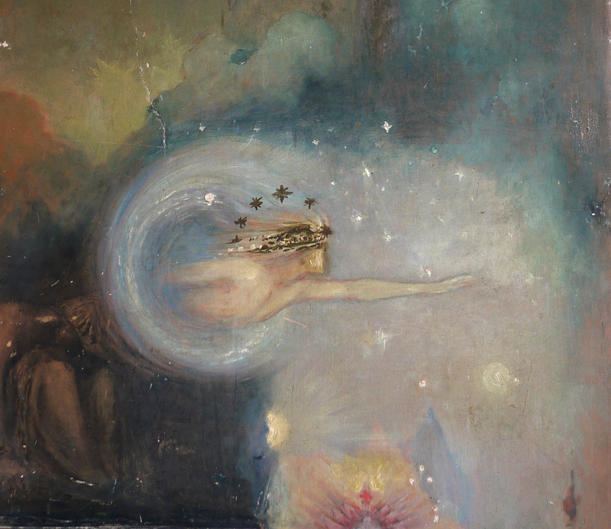
Detail of a Theosophical mural painting by Russell and Yeats

About dreams, he states that Freud's interpretation "throws no light upon the architect of the dream" and considers that there is a Consciousness that transcends wakefulness and sleep, which is responsible for the rapid creation of dreams.

when our lamp is lit, we find the house of our being has many chambers, and creatures live there who come and go, and we must ask whether they have the right to be in our house; and there are corridors there leading into the hearts of others, and windows which open into eternity, and we hardly can tell where our own being ends and another begins, or if there is any end to our being. If we brood with love upon this myriad unity, following the meditation ordained by Buddha for the brothers of his order, to let our minds pervade the whole wide world with heart of love, we come more and more to permeate, or to be pervaded by the lives of others. We are haunted by unknown comrades in many moods, whose naked souls pass through ours, and reveal themselves to us in an unforgettable instant, and we know them as we hardly know those who are the daily comrades of our heart, who, however intimate, are hidden from us by the husk of the body. As the inner life grows richer we beget more of these affinities.

The Candle of the Light is an autobiography in which he gives insight into his personal mysticism, without reference to other religious writers or Theosophist sources. It also contains a chapter on Celtic cosmogenesis.

== Last years and death ==
Russell, who had become increasingly unhappy in the Irish Free State (which according to Yeats he called "a country given over to the Devil"), moved to England soon after his wife's death in 1932. Despite his failing health he went on a final lecture tour in the United States, but returned home utterly exhausted. He died of cancer in Bournemouth in 1935.

His body was brought back to Ireland and interred in Mount Jerome Cemetery, Dublin.

== Gallery of paintings ==
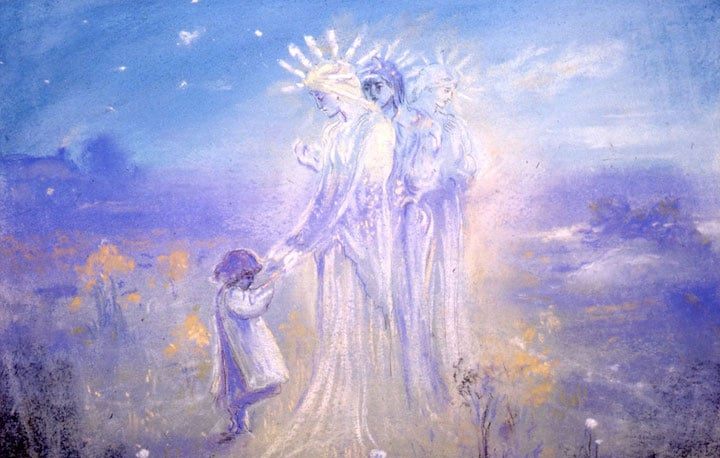

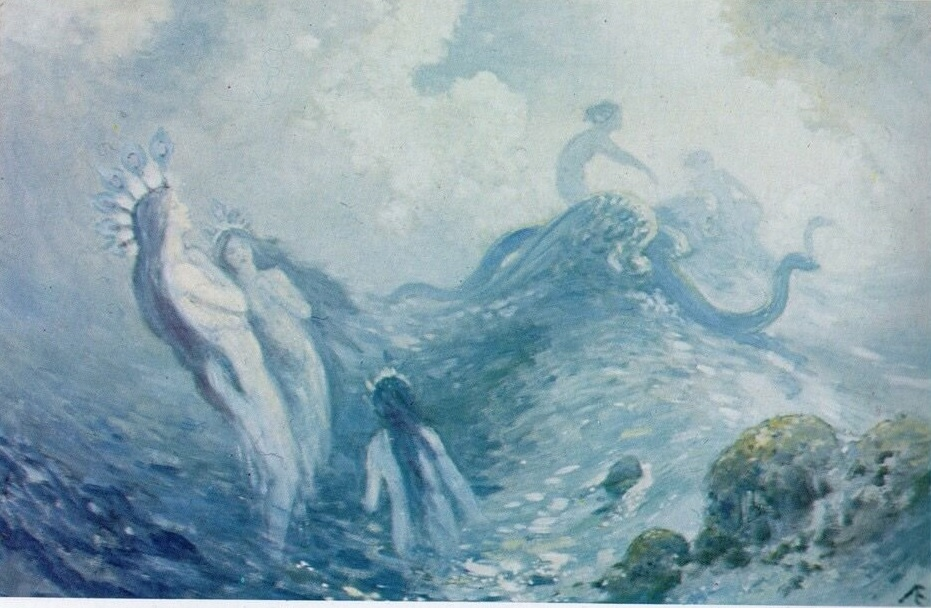

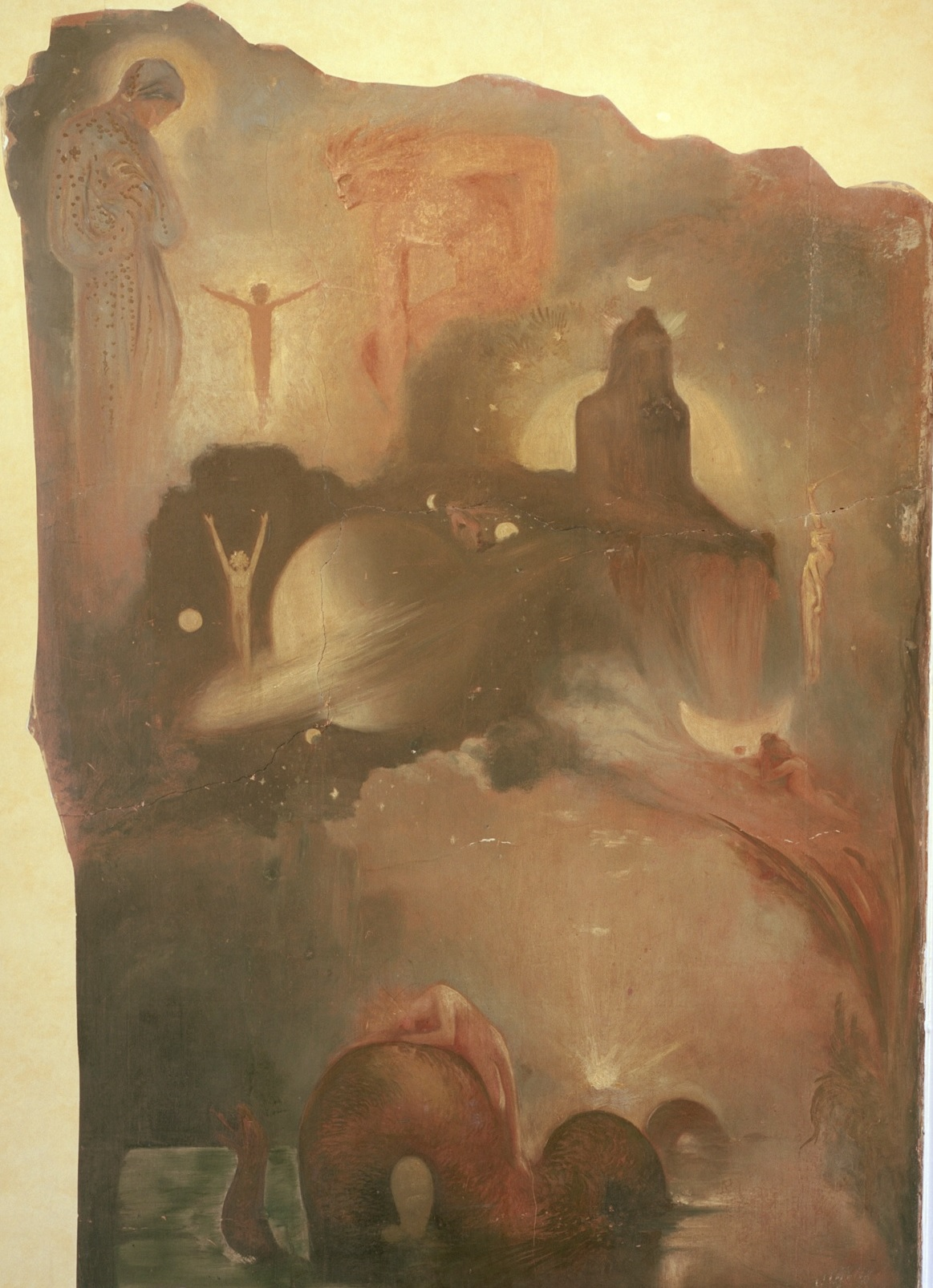

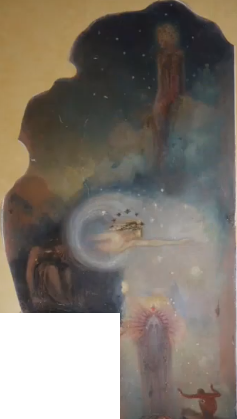

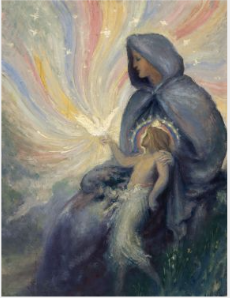

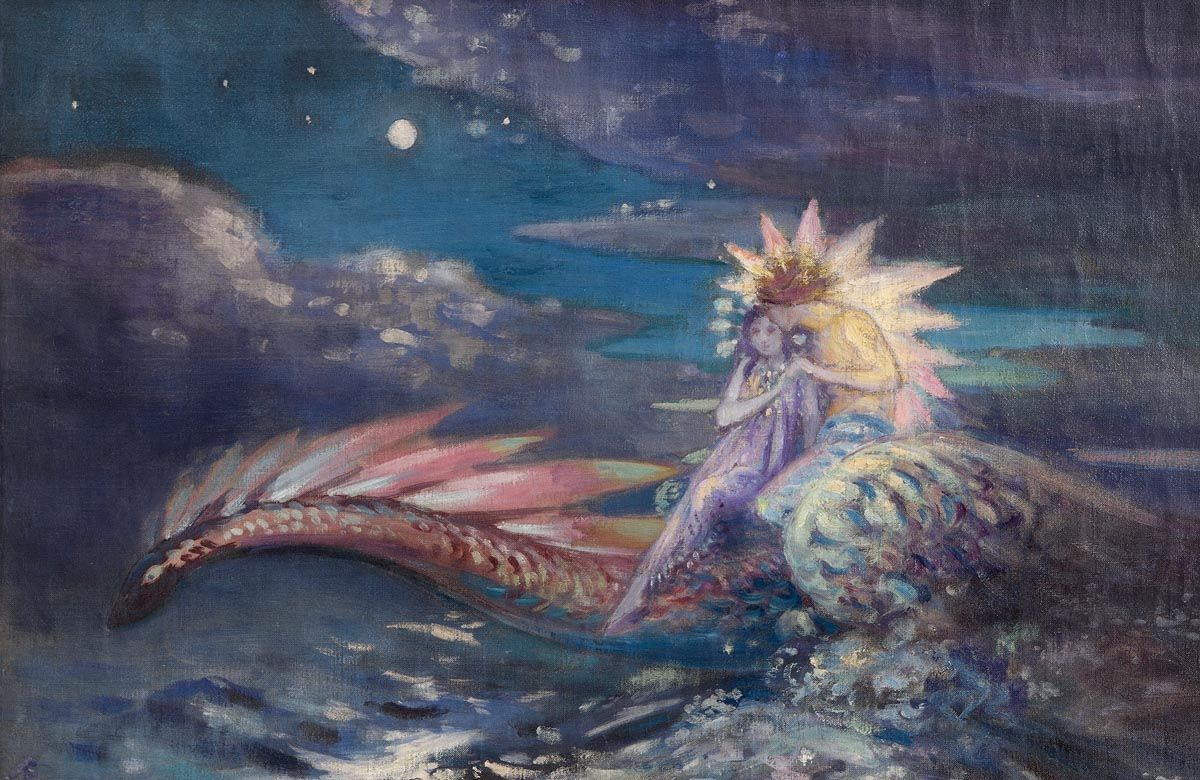

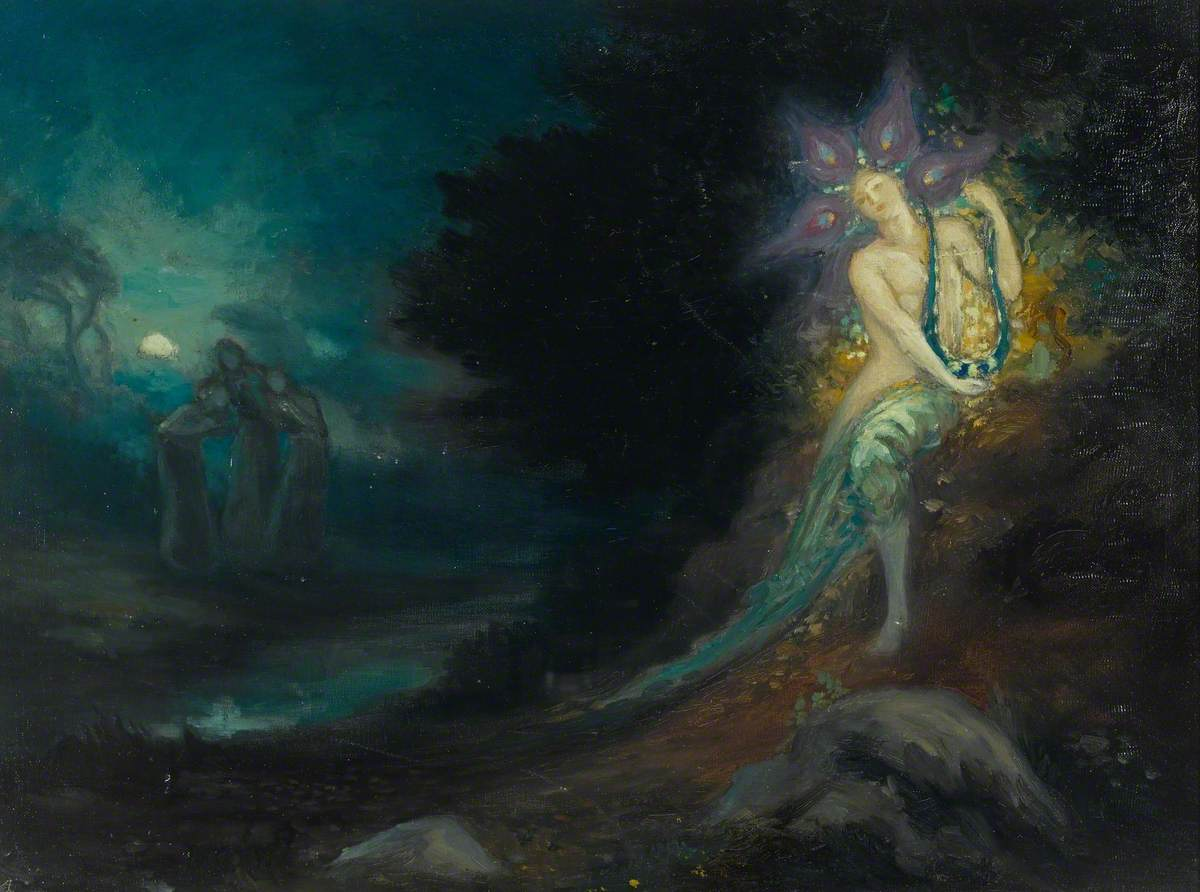

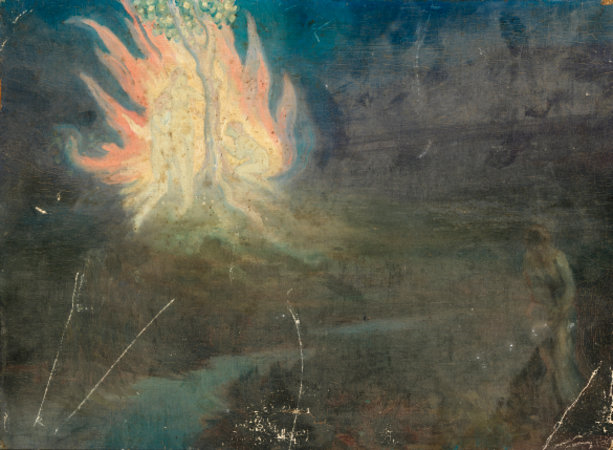

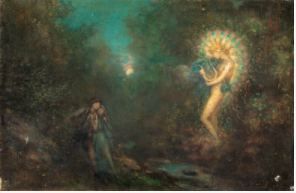

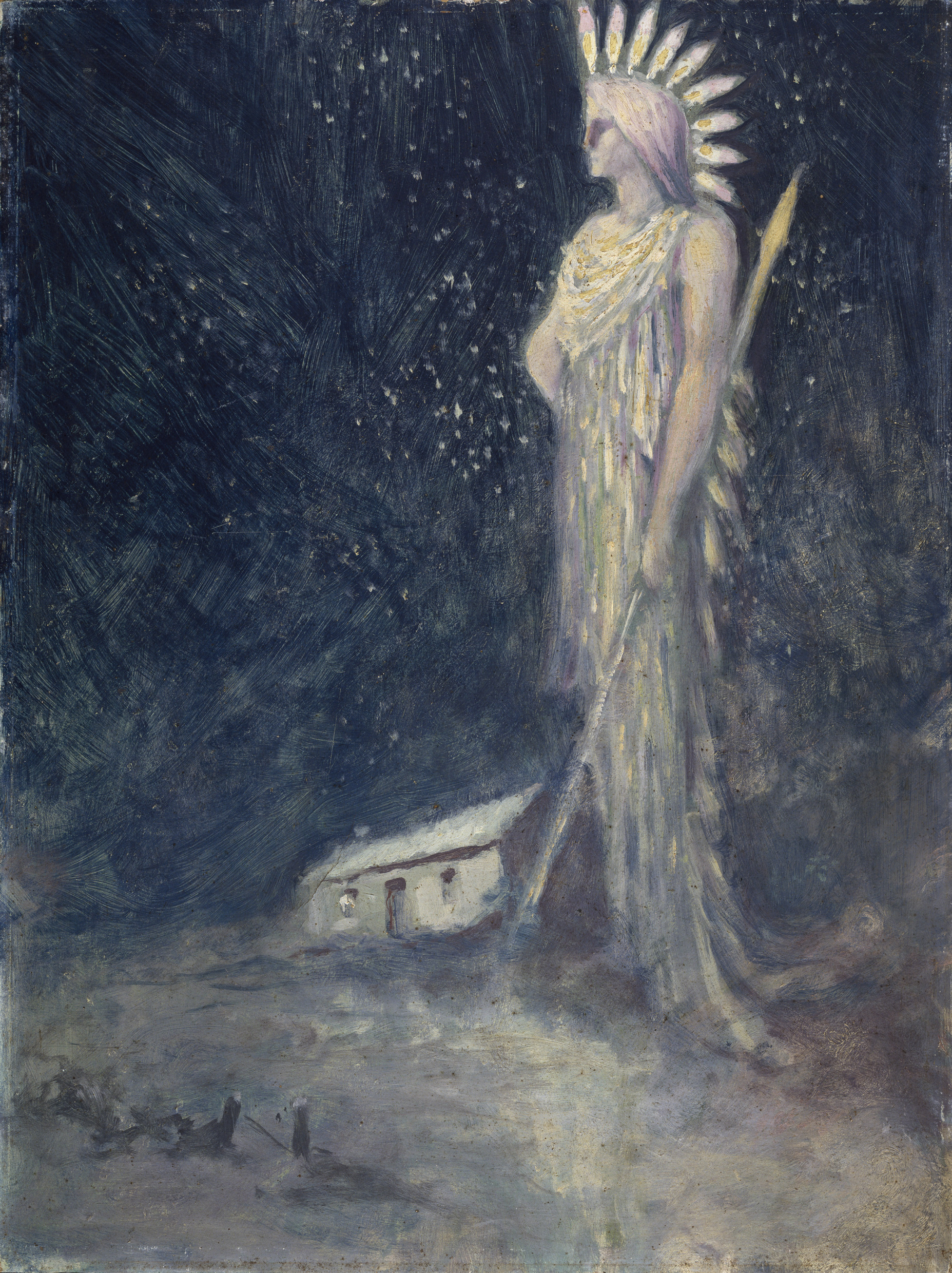

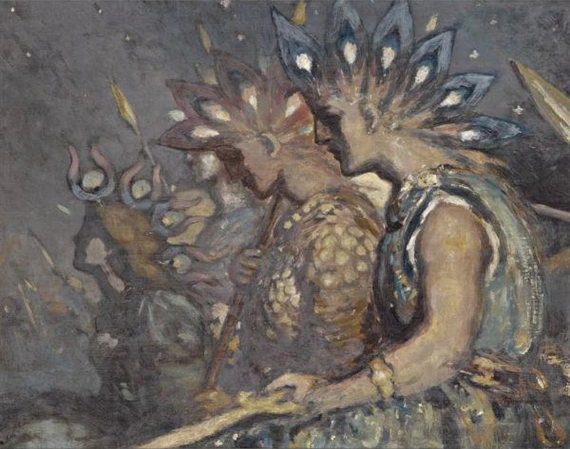

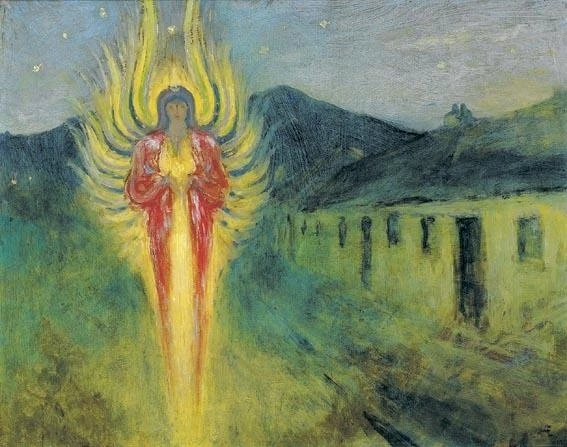

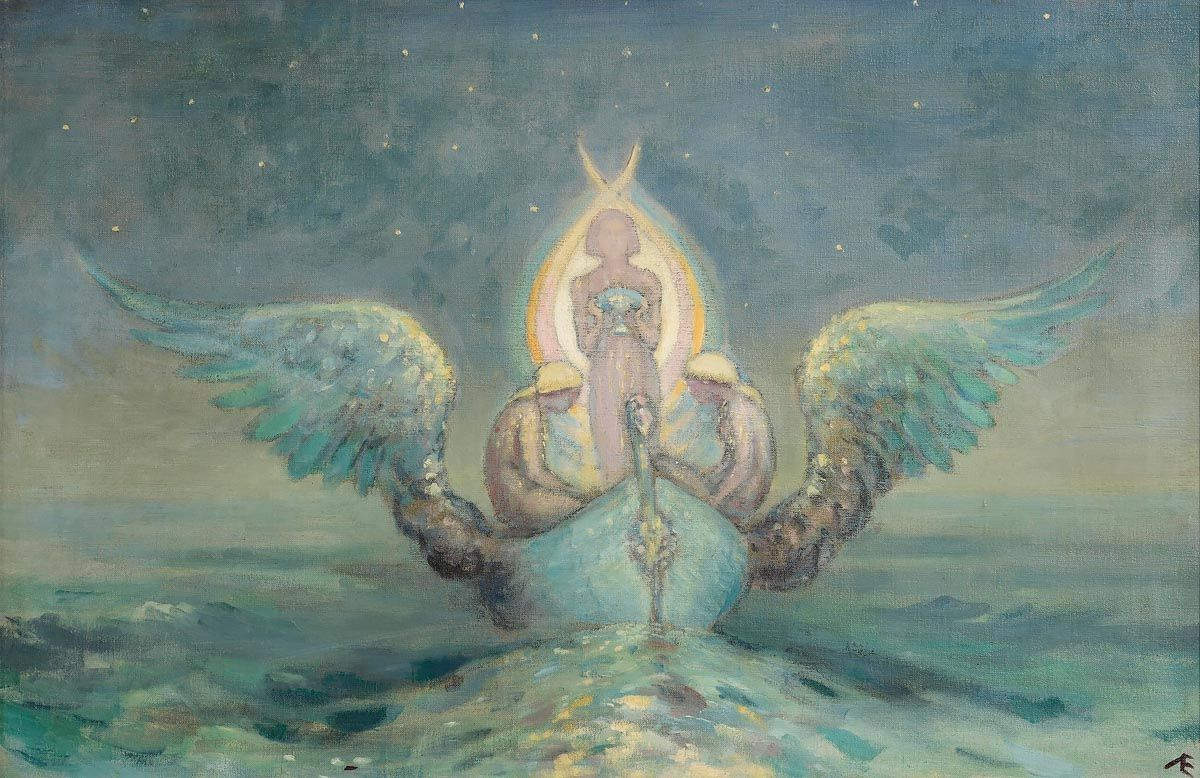

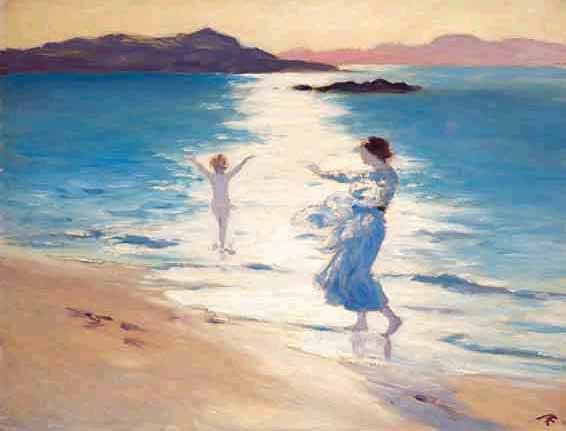

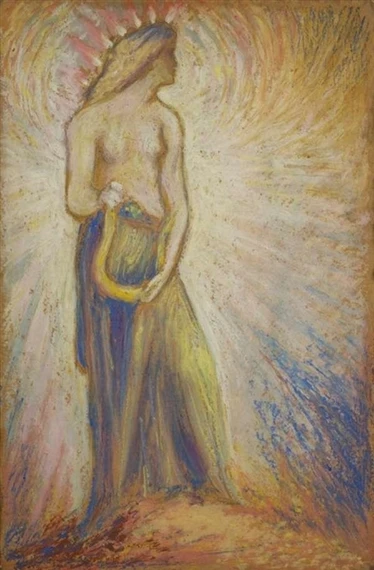

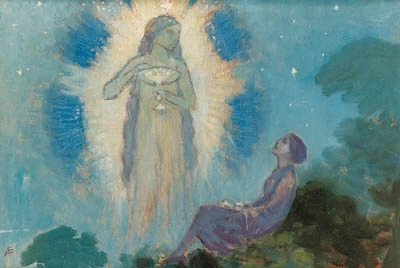

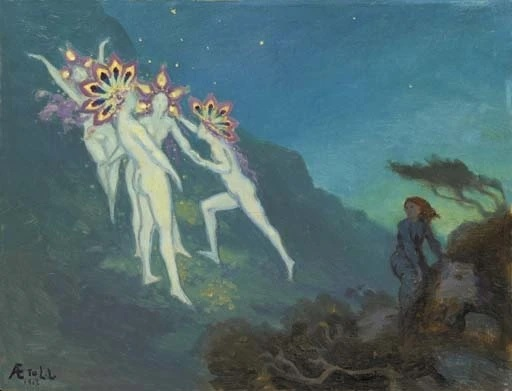

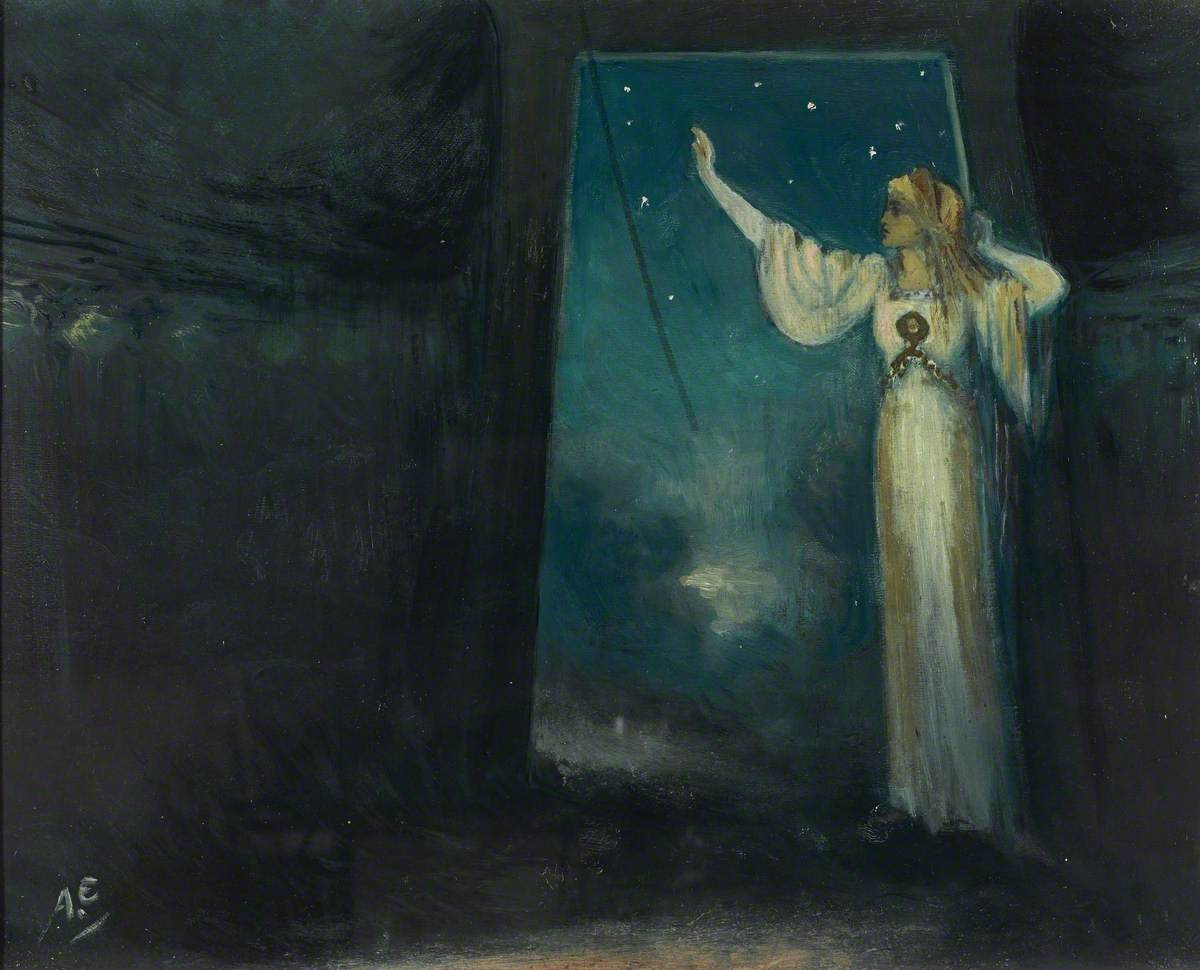

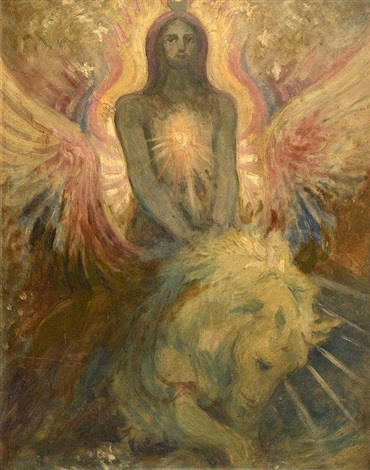

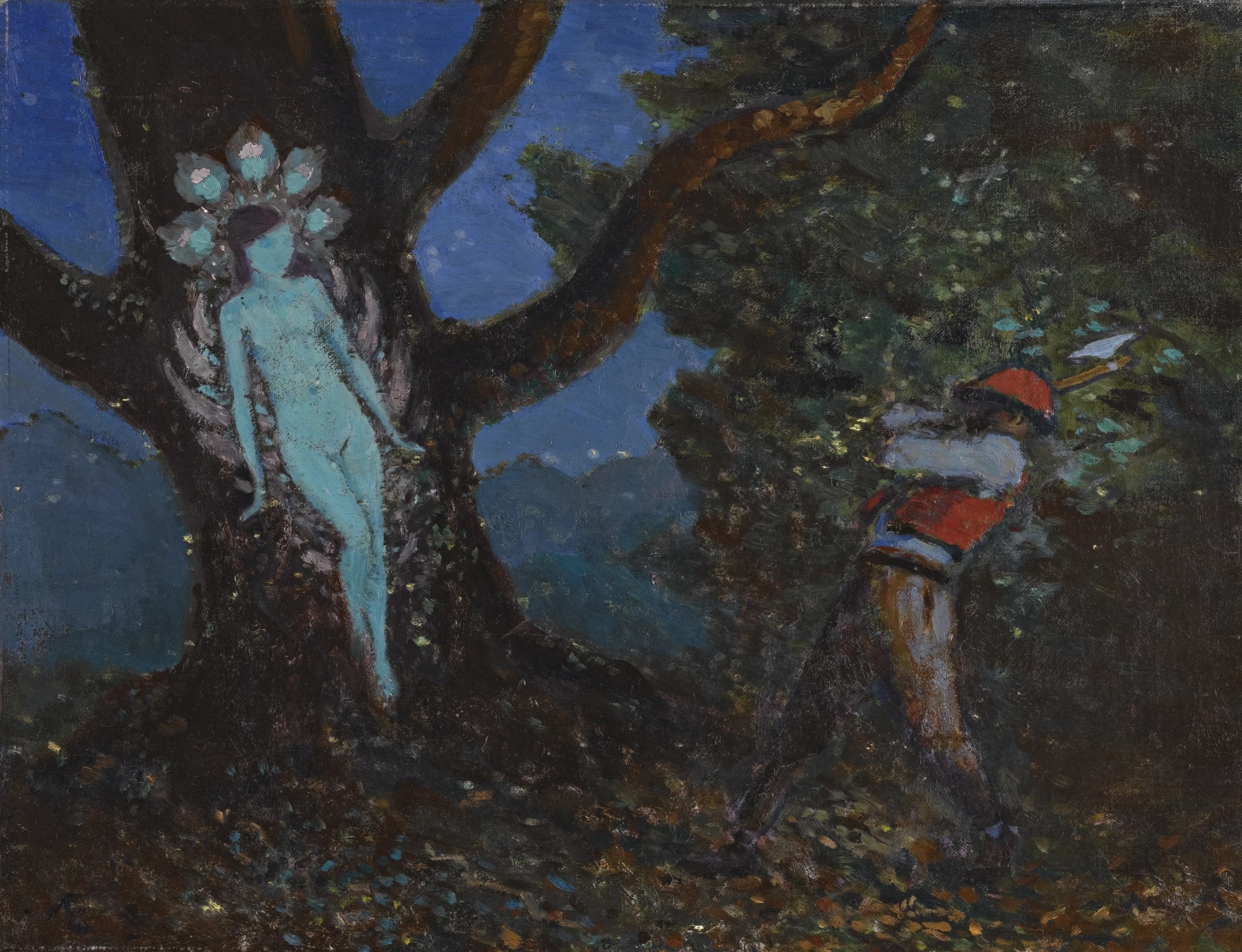

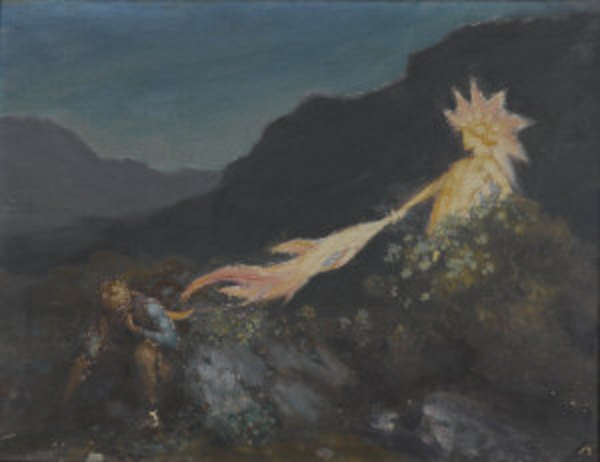

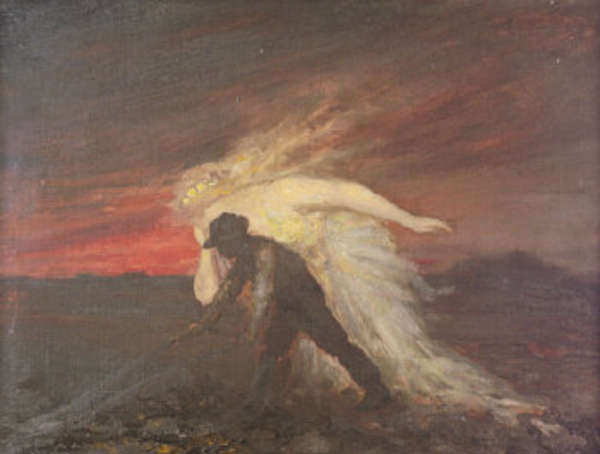

== Poetry ==
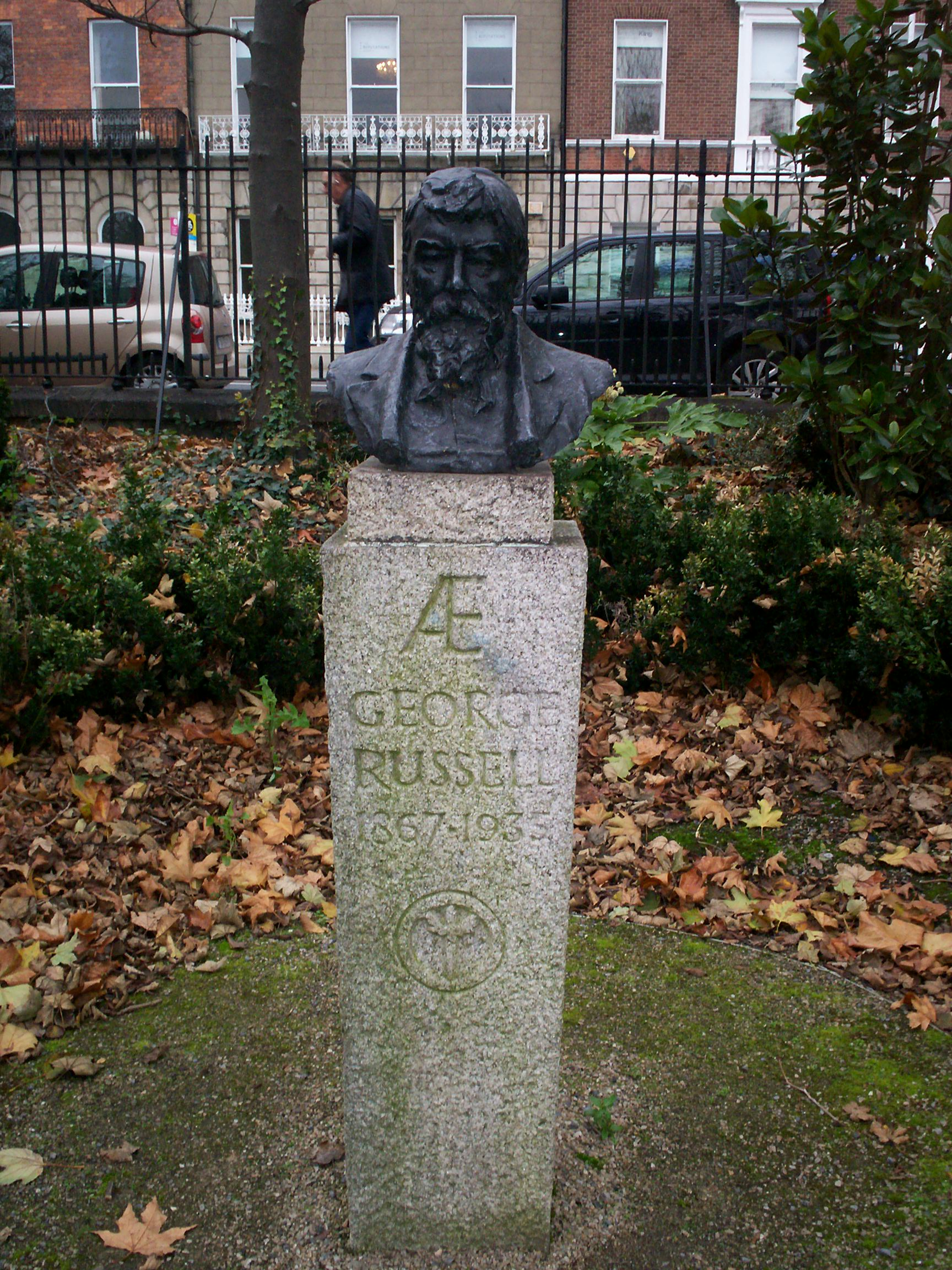
Bust of George William Russell in Merrion Square, Dublin

- Homeward Songs by the Way (Dublin: Whaley 1894)
- The Earth Breath and Other Poems (NY&London: John Lane 1896)
- The Nuts of Knowledge (Dublin: Dun Emer Press, 1903)
- The Divine Vision and Other Poems (London: Macmillan; NY: Macmillan 1904)
- By Still Waters (Dublin: Dun Emer Press 1906)
- Deirdre (Dublin: Maunsel 1907)
- Collected Poems (London: Macmillan 1913) (2nd. edit. 1926)
- Gods of War, with Other Poems (Dublin: priv. 1915)
- Imaginations and Reveries (Dublin & London: Maunsel 1915)
- Candle of Vision: Autobiography of a Mystic (London: Macmillan, 1918)
- Voices of the Stones (London: Macmillan, 1925)
- Midsummer Eve (NY: Crosby Gaige 1928)
- Enchantment and Other Poems (NY: Fountain; London: Macmillan 1930)
- Vale and Other Poems (London: Macmillan 1931)
- Song and Its Fountains (London: Macmillan 1932)
- Verses for Friends (Dublin: Printed for the writer 1932)
- The House of Titans and Other Poems (London: Macmillan 1934)
- Selected Poems (London: Macmillan 1935).

== Novels ==
- The Interpreters (1922)
- The Avatars (1933)

== Essays ==
- AE in the Irish Theosophist (1892–97)
- The Hero In Man (The Orpheus Press 1909)
- The Renewal of Youth (The Orpheus Press 1911)
- Ideals of the New Rural Society, in: Horace Plunkett, Ellice Pilkington, George Russell (AE), The United Irishwomen – Their place, work and ideals. With a Preface by Rev. T. A. Finlay (Dublin: Maunsel 1911
- Co-operation and Nationality: A guide for rural reformers from this to the next generation (Dublin: Maunsel 1914 )
- The National Being: Some Thoughts on an Irish Polity (Dublin: Maunsel 1916)
- The Candle of Vision (London: Macmillan 1918)
- The Inner and the Outer Ireland ( Dublin, Talbot Press, 1921) (Pamphlet)
- Song and Its Fountains (1932)
- The Living Torch (1937)

== Legacy ==
An "AE Russell: Glenveagh and Donegal" exhibition ran in March 2025, in Glenveagh Castle, where Russell had been a regular guest of Arthur Kingsley Porter.
