= Hester Varian =

Irish poet and novelist

- Born: 1828
- Died: 15 April 1898 (aged 69); Dublin, Ireland
- Other names: Hester Varian Sigerson; Hester Sigerson
- Spouse: George Sigerson
- Children: 4, including Dora Sigerson Shorter and Hester Sigerson Piatt
- Relatives: Clement Shorter (son-in-law); Elizabeth Willoughby Varian (sister-in-law)

Hester Varian Sigerson (1828 – 15 April 1898) was an Irish poet and novelist based in Cork and Dublin.

== Biography ==
Hester Varian was born in Cork in 1828, the daughter of Amos Varian and Dora Walpole. Varian came from a republican and nationalist family. In 1861 she married physician, professor, historian and translator George Sigerson. They had two daughters and two sons; both sons died young. Varian died in Dublin in 1898, at the age of 69. Her grave is in Glasnevin Cemetery.

== Literary career ==
Varian wrote for Harp, Cork Examiner, Irish Monthly, Young Ireland, and others. Her only novel, published in 1889, was A Ruined Race; or, The Last MacManus of Drumroosk, about an Irish farmer and the Great Famine. She and her husband hosted gatherings of Irish writers, revolutionaries, and artists, including "Yeats, Casement, MacDonagh, and Pearse". Katherine Tynan and Frances Wynne were some of her female literary guests.

Varian's literary connections included familial relationships. Her older brother Ralph Varian was a ballad collector. Her daughter Hester became a noted writer, and her daughter Dora became a noted poet and sculptor. Poet Elizabeth Willoughby Varian was her sister-in-law, and English critic Clement Shorter was her son-in-law. Her grandson Donn Piatt (1905–1970) was an essayist.
