= Tynan (disambiguation) =

Tynan is a civil parish in Northern Ireland.

Tynan may also refer to:

== Places ==
- Tynan, Texas

== People ==
- Bill Tynan (born 1940), British Member of Parliament
- Katharine Tynan (1859–1931), Irish writer
- Kenneth Tynan (1927–1980), English theatre critic and writer
- Ronan Tynan (born 1960), Irish tenor singer
- T. J. Tynan (born 1992), American ice hockey player
- Tynan O'Mahony family:
  - Nora Tynan O'Mahony (1866–1954), Irish poet and writer, sister of Katherine
  - David Tynan O'Mahony (1936–2005), known professionally as Dave Allen, comedian and actor
