= Rose Kavanagh =

Irish editor, writer and poet

Rose Kavanagh (24 June 1859 or 1860 – 26 February 1891) was an Irish editor, writer and poet.

== Biography ==
Rose Kavanagh was born at Killadroy, in County Tyrone. When she was eleven years old, her family settled at Mullaghmore, near Augher. She was educated chiefly at Loreto Convent, Omagh. She first wanted to become a painter, and she began studying in Dublin in the Metropolitan School of Art. She gradually transferred from art to literature, and soon became a contributor to several journals and magazines on both sides of the Atlantic.

In the early 1880s she worked as sub-editor for Richard Pigott (whom she described as a "fine fat rat") on The Irishman newspaper. While editing a paper connected with it, The Shamrock (previously associated with William O'Brien), she made the acquaintance of Katharine Tynan and the two later became firm friends. Tynan described her as "a tall girl with a fair skin which had a shade of brown in it", with "fearless grey eyes...and a most honest look". At the time she was living in the house of the Fenian, Charles Kickham, by now blind, whom she nursed until his death. He used to call her the "Rose of Knockmany", after a poem she had published in the Irish Monthly.

In 1887 Mrs Dwyer Gray, wife of the proprietor of the Freeman's Journal, John Gray, started a section of the paper called The Irish Fireside, and engaged Rose Kavanagh as editor. With the job came the use of several rooms in the newspaper offices in Middle Abbey Street, which became the meeting place of an ever-growing circle of friends and literary acquaintances. The latter included Douglas Hyde, W. B. Yeats, Stephen Gwynn, the old Fenians Denis Dowling Mulcahy and John O'Leary and his sister, Ellen. Among her friends she included Alice Milligan, Anna Johnston (Ethna Carbery), Alice Furlong and Hester and Dora Sigerson. The Irish Fireside led to the formation of the Irish Fireside Club, the largest children's association in Ireland in the late 1880s, which later supplied the Gaelic League and other nationalist organisations with young activists. Rose Kavanagh wrote for the club under the pseudonym "Uncle Remus".

She contributed to the Dublin University Review, The Nation, The Shamrock, Young Ireland, and the Weekly Freeman. Her writing was admired by Matthew Russell, editor of the Irish Monthly, and its circle of writers and poets. She was introduced to the American public by John Boyle O'Reilly in the Boston Pilot, and by Alfred Williams in the Providence Journal.

She had always suffered from tuberculosis; for many years she was under the care of George Sigerson, who monitored her progress. On his advice she spent a winter in Italy but felt homesick and lonely. She died from the effects of a cold which she caught while visiting her mother at Christmas. Many tributes appeared in the Irish Monthly and other publications. An obituary was written by W. B. Yeats in the Boston Pilot.

== Family ==
Rose Kavanagh had a brother John who died suddenly while studying for the priesthood at Maynooth. She also had a sister, a Mrs. Campbell, who nursed her in her final illness, and a sister Ann (Meehan) who emigrated to New Zealand and raised a family there.
