= Sigerson =

Sigerson is one of the older surnames in Dublin, Ireland, traceable to the Middle Ages, and probably of Viking origin. It may refer to:

- George Sigerson (1835 – 1925), doctor, scientist and poet
- Davitt Sigerson (born 1957), an American novelist
- Dora Sigerson Shorter (1866-1918), an Irish poet
- Kari Sigerson (born 1962), CFDA award-winning American shoe designer and founder of luxury shoe labels Sigerson Morrison and Alumnae
- "A Norwegian explorer named Sigerson", a pseudonym adopted by Sherlock Holmes mentioned in The Adventure of the Empty House and also cited as the name of a violinist in The Seven-Per-Cent Solution
- Sigerson Clifford (1913-1985), an Irish poet and playwright
- Sigerson Cup, a Gaelic football trophy in Ireland
