= Tynan (surname) =

Irish surname

Tynan is a surname of Irish origin, a shortened Anglicized form of Gaelic Ó Teimhneáin ‘descendant of Teimhneán’ which is probably derived from a diminutive of Old Irish teimhean meaning ‘dark’.

It may refer to:

== People ==
- Bill Tynan (born 1940), British politician
- Cecily Tynan (born 1969), American television meteorologist
- Jack Tynan (1925–2020), New Zealander cricketer and hockey player
- Joe Tynan (born 1950), Irish hurler
- Josh Tynan (born 1993), Australian rules footballer
- Katharine Tynan (1859–1931), Irish poet and novelist
- Kathleen Tynan (1937–1995), Canadian-British author
- Kenneth Tynan (1927–1980), English theatre critic and writer
- Lowri Tynan (born 1987), Welsh swimmer
- Margaret Tynan (1930–2007), Irish politician
- Ronan Tynan (born 1960), Irish singer
- Scott Tynan (born 1983), English footballer
- T. J. Tynan (born 1992), American ice hockey player
- Thomas Tynan (1871–1953), Irish Fianna Fáil politician
- Tommy Tynan (born 1955), English footballer

== Fictional characters ==
- Joe Tynan, lead character of The Seduction of Joe Tynan, a 1979 American film, portrayed by Alan Alda

== See also ==
- Tynan (disambiguation)
