= Hinkson =

Hinkson is a surname. Notable people with the surname include:

- Hinkson Creek, in Columbia, Missouri
- John B. Hinkson (1840–1901), Mayor of Chester, Pennsylvania
- Katharine Tynan Hinkson, (1861–1931), Irish-born writer, known for her novels and poetry
- Pamela Hinkson (1900–1982), Anglo-Irish writer, author of the book The Ladies' Road (1932)
- Ronald "Boo" Hinkson, Saint Lucian jazz guitarist
