= Varian =

Varian may refer to:

- Varian (name), including a list of people and fictional characters with the surname and given name
- Varian Associates, an electronics company which split up into three companies in 1999:
  - Varian Medical Systems
  - Varian, Inc.
  - Varian Semiconductor
- Varian Data Machines, a division of Varian Associates which made minicomputers
- Varian, Iran, a village in Alborz Province, Iran
- USS Varian, a U.S. Navy World War II destroyer escort

== See also ==
- Varien, American music producer
- Varian v. Delfino, a California Supreme Court opinion
- Varian Rule
