= The Enniskillen Dragoon =

Song

"The Enniskillen Dragoon" (Roud 2185; also called "Enniskillen Dragoon" or "The Enniskillen Dragoons") is an Irish folk song associated with the Inniskilling Dragoons, a British Army regiment based at Enniskillen, County Fermanagh, Ireland. The air was used as the regiment's signature quick march. The oldest lyrics tell of the love of a local lady for a soldier serving in the eponymous regiment.

E. M. Morphy remembered hearing the "familiar old ballad" in Toronto on his arrival from Enniskillen in 1835. William Frederick Wakeman in 1870 called it "an old song once, and to some extent still[,] popular on the banks of the Erne". Patrick Weston Joyce (1827–1914) wrote in 1909:

This song, though of Ulster origin, was a great favourite in Munster, where I learned it when very young: it was indeed sung all over Ireland. I published the words more than fifty years ago in a newspaper called "The Tipperary Leader," and I have several copies printed on ballad-sheets. Some few years ago I gave a copy of the air — as I had it in memory — to Dr. [George] Sigerson, who wrote a new song to it which was published in Mr. A. P. Graves's "Irish Song Book" : and in that publication — so far as I know — the air appeared in print for the first time.

Sigerson's version adapts the chorus and replaces the verses entirely. In the 1960s, Tommy Makem, who characterised the original as having "obscure verses and a very singable chorus", wrote new verses with the regiment's soldiers describing their service in the Peninsular War. Makem renamed it "Fare Thee Well Enniskillen" and performed it with the Clancy Brothers.

== Text ==
The following text appears in an 1840 collection of American broadsides:

A beautiful damsel of fame and renown,
A gentleman’s daughter of fame and renown,
As she rode by the barracks this beautiful maid,
She stood in her coach to see the draggoons parade.

They were all dress’d out like gentleman’s sons,
With their bright shining swords and carbine guns,
With their silver mounted pistols, she observed them full soon,
Because that she lov’d her Enniskillen draggoon.

You bright sons of Mars who stand on the right,
Whose armour doth shine like the bright stars of night,
Saying, Willy, dearest Willy, you’ve listed full soon,
For to serve as a royal Enniskillen draggoon.

Oh! Flora, dearest Flora, your pardon I crave,
It’s now and forever I must be a slave,
Your parents they insulted me both morning and noon,
For fear that you’d wed an Enniskillen draggoon.

Oh! mind, dearest Willy, O mind what you say,
For children are bound their parents to obey;
For when we ’re leaving Ireland they will all change their tune,
Saying, the Lord may be with you, Enniskillen draggoon.

Fare-you-well, Enniskillen, fare-you-well for a while,
And all around the borders of Erin’s green Isle;
And when the war is over we'll return in full bloom,
And they'll all welcome home the Enniskillen draggoon.

Joyce's 1909 version is similar; Flora is specified to be from Monaghan town. In 1966, song collector Hugh Shields recorded Eddie Butcher of Magilligan singing a similar version as a slow lament. A 1930 version adds a final verse in which Willy and Flora are married.

== See also ==
- "Fare Thee Well" (song)
