= Highways and Byways (series of regional guides) =

The Highways and Byways series of 36 regional guides were published between 1898 and 1948 by Macmillan's. These guides were noted for their presentation of a wide variety of interesting places, notable historical events, local flora and fauna, folklore, and legends, as well as the artwork, produced by many noted artists, including: Arthur B. Connor, Nelly Erichsen, F. L. Griggs, Joseph McCullough, Edmund Hort New, Joseph Pennell, Hugh Thomson, David Young Cameron and Stanley Roy Badmin. At the end of each book were folded maps.

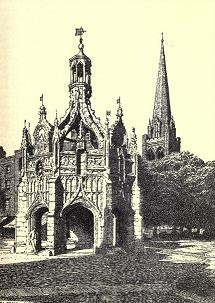
F. L. Griggs' illustration of Chichester Cross (1904) from the book "Highways and byways in Sussex"

David Milner edited a selection from the guides which was published as The Highways and Byways of Britain in 2008.

== Listing by date of first edition ==
- Highways and Byways in North Wales (1898 ) by A. G. Bradley; illustrations by Joseph Pennell and Hugh Thomson
- Highways and Byways in Donegal and Antrim (1899) by Stephen Gwynn; illustrations by Hugh Thomson
- Highways and Byways in Yorkshire (1899) by Arthur H. Norway; illustrations by Joseph Pennell and Hugh Thomson
- Highways and Byways in Normandy (1900) by Percy Dearmer; illustrations by Joseph Pennell and Hugh Thomson
- Highways and Byways in East Anglia (1901) by William A. Dutt; illustrations by Joseph Pennell
- Highways and Byways in the Lake District (1901) by A. G. Bradley; illustrations by Joseph Pennell
- Highways and Byways in Hertfordshire (1902) by Herbert W. Tompkins; illustrations by F.L. Griggs
- Highways and Byways in London (1902) by Mrs. E. T. Cook; illustrations by F.L. Griggs
- Highways and Byways in South Wales (1903) by A. G. Bradley; illustrations by F.L. Griggs
- Highways and Byways in Sussex (1904) by E. V. Lucas; illustrations by F.L. Griggs
- Highways and Byways in Derbyshire (1905) by J. B. Firth; illustrations by Nelly Erichsen
- Highways and Byways in Oxford and the Cotswolds (1905) by Herbert A. Evans; illustrations by F.L. Griggs
- Highways and Byways in Berkshire (1906) by J. E. Vincent; illustrations by F.L. Griggs
- Highways and Byways in Dorset (1906) by Sir Frederick Treves; illustrations by Joseph Pennell
- Highways and Byways in Kent (1907) by Walter Jerrold; illustrations by Hugh Thomson
- Highways and Byways in Hampshire (1908) by D. H. Moutray Read; illustrations by Arthur B. Connor
- Highways and Byways in Surrey (1908) by Eric Parker; illustrations by Hugh Thomson
- Highways and Byways in Middlesex (1909) by Walter Jerrold; illustrations by Hugh Thomson
- Highways and Byways in Buckinghamshire (1910) by Clement King Shorterl illustrations by F. L. Griggs
- Highways and Byways in Cambridge and Ely (1910) by Rev. Edward Conybeare; illustrations by F.L. Griggs
- Highways and Byways in Nottinghamshire (1910) by J. B. Firth; illustrations by F.L. Griggs
- Highways and Byways in Devon and Cornwall (1911) by Arthur H. Norway; illustrations by Joseph Pennell
- Highways and Byways in Somerset (1912) by Edward Hutton; illustrations by Nelly Erichsen
- Highways and Byways in Hardy's Wessex (1913) by Hermann Lea; illustrations by the author
- Highways and Byways in The Border (1913) by Andrew Lang and John Lang; illustrations by Hugh Thomson
- Highways and Byways in Lincolnshire (1914) by Willingham Franklin Rawnsley; illustrations by F.L. Griggs
- Highways and Byways in Shakespeare's Country (1914) by W. H. Hutton; illustrations by Edmund H. New
- Highways and Byways in Galloway and Carrick (1916) by Rev. C. H. Dick; illustrations by Hugh Thomson
- Highways and Byways in Wiltshire (1917) by Edward Hutton; illustrations by Nelly Erichsen
- Highways and Byways in Northamptonshire and Rutland (1918) by Herbert A. Evans; illustrations by F.L. Griggs
- Highways and Byways in Northumbria (1920) by P. Anderson Graham; illustrations by Hugh Thomson
- Highways and Byways in Leicestershire (1926) by J. B. Firth; illustrations by F.L. Griggs
- Highways and Byways in Gloucestershire (1932) by Edward Hutton; illustrations by Hugh Thomson
- Highways and Byways in the West Highlands (1935) by Seton Gordon; illustrations by Sir D.Y. Cameron
- Highways and Byways in Essex (1939) by Clifford Bax; illustrations by F.L. Griggs and S. R. Badmin
- Highways and Byways in the Welsh Marches (1939) by S. P. B. Mais; illustrations by Joseph M. McCullough
- Highways and Byways in the Central Highlands (1948) by Seton Gordon; illustrations by Sir D.Y. Cameron
