= Charles Dick =

Charles Dick may refer to:

- Charles W. F. Dick, American politician from Ohio
- Charles Dick (rugby union), Scottish rugby union player
- Charles Dick (cricketer), South African cricketer
- Charles Hill Dick, Scottish minister and author
- Charlie Dick, American Linotype operator, widower of Patsy Cline

== See also ==
- Dick Charles, American songwriter
