= Varian (name) =

Varian is a surname and given name.

== People with the surname ==
- Bertram S. Varian Sr. (1872–1963), American judge
- Dorothy Varian (1895–1985), American painter
- Elizabeth Willoughby Varian (1821–1896), Irish poet and nationalist
- Ethon Varian (born 2001), Irish footballer
- Hal Varian (born 1947), American economist
- Hester Varian (1828–1898), Irish poet and novelist
- Isaac L. Varian (1793–1864), American politician and mayor of New York
- John Osborne Varian (1863–1931), American theosophist
- Roger Varian (born 1979), British racehorse trainer
- Russell Varian (1898–1959), co-founder of Varian Associates, son of John Osborne Varian
- Sigurd Varian (1901–1961), co-founder of Varian Associates, son of John Osborne Varian
- Sheila Varian (1937–2016), breeder of Arabian horses, niece of Russell and Sigurd Varian

== People with the given name ==
- Varian Fry (1907–1967), American journalist who helped thousands escape from Nazi-occupied Europe during World War II
- Varian Johnson (born 1977), American writer
- Varian Lonamei (born 1962), politician of the Solomon Islands
- Varian Pasquet (born 1999), French rugby player

== Fictional characters with the given name ==
- Varian Wrynn, a character in the Warcraft series
- Varian, a character in Rapunzel's Tangled Adventure
