= Nora Tynan O'Mahony =

Irish poet and novelist

- Born: Nora Tynan; 15 February 1866; Clondalkin, United Kingdom
- Died: 13 December 1954 (aged 88); Dublin, Ireland
- Occupations: Poet, novelist
- Relatives: Katharine Tynan (sister); Dave Allen (grandson)

Nora O'Mahony (born Nora Tynan) (born 15 February 1866 in Clondalkin, died 13 December 1954 in Dublin) was an Irish poet and novelist. Her older sister was the poet and novelist Katharine Tynan.

== Life and work ==
Nora Tynan was born as one of twelve children of Andrew Cullen Tynan and Elizabeth Tynan (née Reilly). Like her older sister Katharine, she was educated at the Dominican convent of St. Catherine of Siena in Drogheda. From an early age, she showed artistic inclinations, especially the ability to paint flowers. Flowers were also a favourite subject of her youthful poems, and floral motifs are prominent in her later works.

On 29 April 1895, Nora married John O'Mahony from Cork, a journalist with the Irish Independent since 1891. The couple lived first near Whitehall in Dublin, then in Drumcondra. After her husband's death on 28 November 1904, the family moved to Tallaght.

Possibly Nora O'Mahony's first published work was the short story The Magpie, which appeared in the New Ireland Review in April 1903. In January the following year, her poem "A city of exile" appeared in the Irish Monthly, after which she regularly published poems in this magazine until June 1931. Her poems also appeared in other Irish, English and American magazines, including in the Pall Mall Gazette. The first prose works appeared in Social Review; her article "Neglect of Irish writers" appeared in The Catholic World (April 1908). She was also editor of the Freeman's Journal.

The marriage of Nora and John O'Mahony had three sons including Gerard "Cully" Tynan O'Mahony, the managing editor of The Irish Times and father of comedian Dave Allen.

Nora O'Mahony died in Dublin on 13 December 1954.

== Works ==
- Tynan O'Mahony, Nora (1915). The Fields of Heaven. E. MacDonald. OCLC 752927332.
- Tynan O'Mahony, Nora (1907). Una's enterprise. George Gill and Sons. OCLC 53844413.
- Tynan O'Mahony, Nora (1912). Mrs Desmond's foster-child. Browne and Nolan. OCLC 40050247.
- Tynan O'Mahony, Nora. The secret of the Yellow Meadows Farm. Browne and Nolan. OCLC 811008730.
