= Anketell Moutray Read =

Recipient of the Victoria Cross (1884–1915)

- Born: 27 October 1884; Cheltenham, England
- Died: 25 September 1915 (aged 30); Hulluch, France
- Burial place: Dud Corner Cemetery, Loos, France
- Military career
- Allegiance: United Kingdom
- Branch: British Army
- Service years: 1901–1915
- Rank: Captain
- Units: Royal Flying Corps; Northamptonshire Regiment
- Conflicts: World War I: First Battle of the Aisne (WIA); Battle of Loos †
- Awards: Victoria Cross

Captain Anketell Moutray Read VC (27 October 1884 – 25 September 1915) was a British Army officer and an English recipient of the Victoria Cross (VC), the highest and most prestigious award for gallantry in the face of the enemy that can be awarded to British and Commonwealth forces.

== Background ==
He was the son of Col. J. Moutray Read of Cheltenham and Mrs. E. Moutray Read of St Leonards on Sea, East Sussex. Anketell's elder sister Rose Moutray Read was an author and horticulturist. He was born in October 1884 and educated at Glengarth preparatory school, Cheltenham, and at the United Services College at Westward Ho!, and passed directly into Sandhurst in 1901. Gazetted to the Gloucestershire Regiment, he served with them three years in India. He transferred to the 7th Hariana Lancers, and exchanged to the Northamptonshire Regiment in 1911.

He joined the Royal Flying Corps in 1912, and went with them to France with the first British Expeditionary in August 1914. He fought at Mons and in the retreat to the Marne. He was attached to the 9th Lancers, and while with them was severely wounded during the fighting on the Aisne in September 1914.

Captain Moutray Read was well known as an athlete and won the heavyweight championship (boxing) of India eight times, and the middle-weight twice. He also won the Army and Navy heavyweight championship at Aldershot and Portsmouth three times, an unequalled record. During one match, an opponent recalls wishing to throw in the towel against him, citing his "devastating jab". As a result, Capt. Moutray Read earned the nickname of "Widowmaker".

== Details ==
He was 30 years old, and a captain in the 1st Battalion, The Northamptonshire Regiment, British Army during the First World War when the following deed took place for which he was awarded the VC.

On 25 September 1915 near Hulluch, France, Captain Moutray Read, although partially gassed, went out several times in order to rally parties of different units which were disorganised and retiring. He led them back into the firing line and regardless of danger to himself, moved about under withering fire, encouraging them, but he was mortally wounded while carrying out this gallant work. He had shown conspicuous bravery on other occasions, particularly on the night of 29/30 July when he carried out of action an officer who was mortally wounded, under a hot fire of rifle and grenades.

== Further information ==
Captain Moutray Read is buried in the Dud Corner Cemetery, Le Rutoire, near Loos-en-Gohelle, France, 2 miles NW of Lens, Plot VII, Row F, Grave 19.

Mrs Moutray Read received news of her son's death while living at 3 Wentworth Place, Wicklow, Co. Wicklow, also a British Army Field Hospital Supplies Depot. Captain Moutray Read is listed on a brass commemorative plaque along with other local men at Wicklow Parish Church. He is also commemorated by a plaque on the wall of the Church of St Michael and All Angels in Bampton, Devon, where his father owned Castle Grove, a fine house on the edge of the town. Anketell's niece, Miss Henrietta Desirée Moutray Read, lived at Castle Grove marrying Sir Christopher William Gerald Henry Codrington in 1969.

== The medal ==
His Victoria Cross is on loan to and displayed at the Abington Park Museum in Northampton, England, the regimental museum of the Northamptonshires.

== Sources ==
- David Harvey (1999) Monuments to Courage
- The Register of the Victoria Cross (This England, 1997)
- Peter F. Batchelor & Christopher Matson (1999) VCs of the First World War – The Western Front 1915
- The Irish Times (4 October, p. 6, 27 November 1915) p. 7, and (11 December 1915) p. 24.
- The Wicklow News-Letter (9 October 1915)
- The London Gazette 29371, (16 November 1915)
