= Maurice Leyne =

Maurice Richard Leyne (c. 1820-1854) was an Irish nationalist, repeal agitator and member of Young Ireland. He was born in about 1820 the grand-nephew of Daniel O'Connell and only member of the family to align himself with the Young Ireland movement.

He was an editor of The Nation on its re-launch in 1849 along with Charles Gavan Duffy, in 1854, Leyne had previously contributed content to the paper in its earlier guise. Leyne left The Nation and moved to Thurles to become editor of the Tipperary Leader newspaper.

He participated in the Rebellion of 1848 and was arrested for treason along with other Young Ireland Leaders - William Smith O'Brien, Francis Meagher, Terence McManus, Patrick O'Donoghue. Leyne was never tried, but served a long time in prison

He was educated at St. Patrick's College, Carlow, along with another Young Irelander James Fintan Lalor. Other relatives of Maurice and of Daniel O'Connell taught or were educated at Carlow College.

Maurice Leyne died of typhus in 1854, and is buried in St Mary's Church, Thurles, Co. Tipperary.
