= Dave Allen (comedian) =

Irish comedian and satirist (1936–2005)

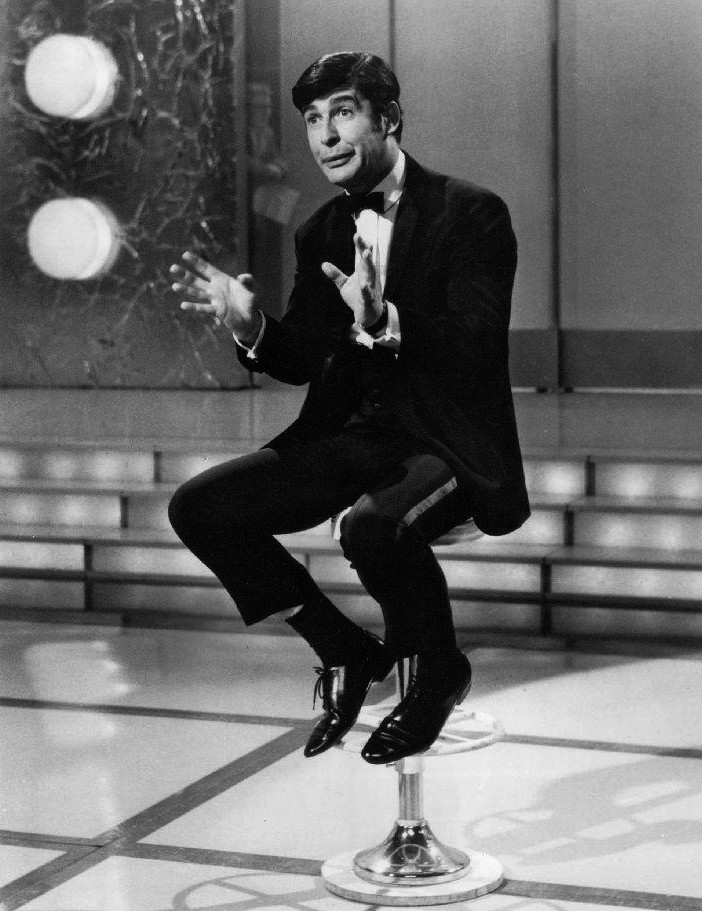
- Allen in 1968
- Born: David Tynan O'Mahony; 6 July 1936; Dublin, Ireland
- Died: 10 March 2005 (aged 68); Kensington, London, England
- Occupations: Comedian; satirist; actor
- Years active: 1959–1998
- Spouses: Judith Stott (m. 1964; div. 1983) Karin Stark (m. 2003)
- Children: 3
- Relatives: Nora Tynan O'Mahony (grandmother); Katherine Tynan (great-aunt)

David Tynan O'Mahony (6 July 1936 – 10 March 2005), known professionally as Dave Allen, was an Irish comedian, satirist, and actor. He was best known for his observational comedy. Allen regularly provoked indignation by highlighting political hypocrisy and showing disdain for religious authority. His technique and style have influenced young British comedians.

Initially becoming known in Australia in 1963 and 1964, Allen made regular television appearances in the United Kingdom from the late 1960s until the mid-1980s. The BBC aired his Dave Allen Show from 1971 to 1986, which was also exported to several other European countries. He had a major resurgence during the late 1980s and early to mid-1990s before retiring in 1998. His television shows were also broadcast in the United States, Canada, Denmark, Sweden, Norway, the Netherlands, Belgium, Yugoslavia, Australia, and New Zealand.

== Early life ==
David Tynan O'Mahony was born in the Firhouse suburb of Dublin on 6 July 1936, the son of an Irish father and English mother. His father, Cullen "Pussy" O'Mahony, was the managing editor of The Irish Times, the son of writer Nora Tynan O'Mahony, and a nephew of writer Katharine Tynan. His mother, Jean Archer, was a housewife. During the Irish War of Independence, his father fought with British Forces as part of the Auxiliary Division; at the end of that conflict, he enlisted in Britain's Palestine Police Force to undertake operations in Mandatory Palestine.

Allen, his brothers, and their mother spent around 18 months living in Keenagh, County Longford after leaving Dublin in the wake of the 1941 North Strand bombings. Following this, they moved back to Dublin and lived at Cherryfield, a house between Firhouse and Templeogue Bridge. Allen was educated at Newbridge College, Terenure College, and the Catholic University School. Allen himself later described the brutal treatment that was sometimes meted out to pupils by the nuns at the latter establishment giving rise to the root of some of his nun jokes. He often referred to them as "The Gestapo in drag". His father died when Allen was 12 years old, and his mother moved the family to England when he was 14.

== Career ==
Allen initially followed his father into journalism, firstly joining the Drogheda Argus as a copy boy, but at the age of 19 went to Fleet Street, London. He drifted through a series of jobs before becoming a Butlins Redcoat at Skegness in a troupe that also included British jazz trumpeter and writer John Chilton. At the end of each summer season he did stand-up at strip clubs; for the next four years, he appeared in various night clubs, theatres, and working men's clubs. When entertainment work was slow, he worked at a toy shop in Sheffield and as a door-to-door salesman of draught excluders. He changed his stage surname to "Allen" at the behest of his agent, who believed that few people in the UK could pronounce "O'Mahony" correctly. Allen agreed to the change because he hoped that a surname beginning with "A" would put him at the top of agents' lists.

The most likely reason that Allen lost the top of his left index finger above the middle knuckle was that he caught it in a machine cog. However, he enjoyed inventing stories to explain the loss, which became a minor part of his act. One version was that his brother John had surprised him by snapping his jaw shut when they were children. A further explanation he gave on his programme, Dave Allen at Large, was that he often stuck his finger in his whiskey glass and it had been eaten away by strong drink. He also said it was worn away from repeatedly brushing the dust from his suit. Allen himself never revealed the true story.

One of his stand-up jokes was that, as a boy, he and his friends would go to see a cowboy movie at the local cinema, then come out ready to play Cowboys and Indians. Staring down at his truncated finger, he would mutter, "I had a sawn-off shotgun." On his show he told a long, elaborate ghost story, ending with "something evil" attacking him in a dark and haunted house. Allen grabbed and bit the attacker, the studio lights came back up, and it was his own left hand.

Allen's first television appearance was on the BBC talent show New Faces in 1959. He hosted pop music shows in the early 1960s, including tours by Adam Faith and Helen Shapiro and in early 1963 was the compere of a tour of Britain, headlined by Shapiro that also included The Beatles. In 1962 he toured South Africa with American vaudeville star Sophie Tucker, whom he described as "one of the most charming and delightful performers with whom I have ever worked". Tucker was impressed with him and suggested he try his luck in Australia. Moving there, he worked with Digby Wolfe on Australian television, becoming Wolfe's resident comedian.

While on tour in Australia in 1963, he accepted an offer to headline a television talk show for Channel 9, Tonight with Dave Allen, which debuted on Thursday 4 July that year and was successful. Only six months after his television début he was banned from the Australian airwaves when, during a live broadcast, he told his show's producer—who had been pressing him to go to a commercial break—to "go away and masturbate", so that he could continue an entertaining interview with Peter Cook and Dudley Moore. The ban was quietly dropped as Allen's popularity continued unabated.

In July 1964 it was announced that Allen would present a 'series of five-minute radio shows' for Sydney station 2UW under the title This Man's World. Allen returned to the United Kingdom in 1964 and made a number of appearances on ITV, including The Blackpool Show and Val Parnell's Sunday Night at the London Palladium and on the BBC on The Val Doonican Show. In 1967, he hosted his own comedy/chat series, Tonight with Dave Allen, made by ATV, for which he received the Variety Club's ITV Personality of the Year Award.

He signed with the BBC in 1968 and appeared on The Dave Allen Show, a variety/comedy sketch series. This was followed from 1971 to 1979 by Dave Allen at Large. The theme tune for The Dave Allen Show and Dave Allen at Large, written by Alan Hawkshaw, was titled "Blarney's Stoned" (originally recorded for KPM in 1969 under the title "Studio 69").

The shows introduced his solo joke-telling-while-sitting-on-a-stool-or-chair-and-drinking routine. This stand-up routine by Allen led to sketches continuing the themes touched on in the preceding monologues. Dave Allen also sought theatre roles and in 1972, he acted as a doctor in the Royal Court's production of Edna O'Brien's play A Pagan Place. With family friend Maggie Smith in the lead, he appeared in Peter Pan in a run during 1973 and 1974. Allen played the roles of Mr Darling and Captain Hook in the production at the London Coliseum. Allen made The Dave Allen Show in Australia (1975–1977) for his old employers, Channel 9.

Allen was also a social commentator, appearing in several television documentaries for ITV, beginning with Dave Allen in the Melting Pot (1969), looking at life in New York City and dealing with issues such as racism and drugs. Later programmes included Dave Allen in Search of the Great English Eccentric (1974) and Eccentrics at Play (1974), in which he looked at colourful characters with idiosyncratic passions.

Allen's satirising of religious ritual, especially Catholic ones, throughout each episode of Dave Allen at Large caused minor controversy, which – coupled with sometimes comparatively frank material – earned the show a risqué reputation. In 1977, the Irish state broadcaster RTÉ placed a de facto ban on Allen but he made appearances on The Late Late Show being interviewed by Gay Byrne. Routines included sketches showing the pope (played by Allen) and his cardinals doing a striptease to music ("The Stripper") on the steps of St Peter's, aggressive priests beating their parishioners and each other, priests who spoke like Daleks through electronic confessionals and an extremely excitable pope who spoke in a Chico Marx style accent as he ordered Allen to "getta your bum outta Roma!" In 1979, he played a troubled property man suffering a mid-life crisis in Alan Bennett's television play One Fine Day. New series of the comedy show, now titled Dave Allen, were broadcast from 1981 until 1990.

=== Later career ===
Allen's final series for the BBC in 1990 caused controversy with this joke:

You wake to the clock, you go to work to the clock, you clock-in to the clock, you clock out to the clock, you come home to the clock, you eat to the clock, you drink to the clock, you go to bed to the clock, you get up to the clock, you go back to work to the clock... You do that for forty years of your life and you retire — what do they f*****g give you? A clock!

This prompted MP Robert Hayward to ask a parliamentary question about "offensive language" in broadcasting. In 1993, Allen returned to ITV, where he starred in the Dave Allen Show, which was his final regular television series.

By the late 1990s, Allen was living quietly in semi-retirement at his family home in Holland Park, west London. He had given up cigarettes in the 1980s, having smoked regularly during earlier television appearances. A comedy skit in 1994 talked not only about quitting smoking but hating the smell of smoke. The 1990s saw him make occasional chat show appearances and discuss his career in the six-part The Unique Dave Allen (BBC, 1998), in between clips from his past BBC series. As he grew older, Allen brought a rueful awareness of ageing to his material, with reflections on the antics of teenagers and the sagging skin and sprouting facial hair of age. He was presented with a lifetime achievement award at the British Comedy Awards in 1996.

== Material ==
=== Act ===
Allen's act was typified by a relaxed, rueful, and intimate style. He sat on a high bar stool facing his audience, smoking and occasionally sipping from a glass of what he always allowed people to assume was whiskey but in fact was merely ginger ale with ice. He was a sober-minded man, and although he sometimes appeared crotchety and irritable on stage he always gave off an air of charm and serene melancholy, both in his act and in real life. Each day he pored over newspapers, scribbling notes and ideas for his routines. Along with his seated stand-up routines, his television shows were interspersed with filmed sketch comedy.

=== Religion ===
Allen was a religious sceptic. He once said he was "what you might call a practising atheist" and often joked, "I'm an atheist, thank God." His scepticism came as a result of his deeply held objections to the rigidity of his strict Catholic schooling. Consequently, religion became an important subject for his humour, especially the Catholic Church and the Church of England, generally mocking church customs and rituals rather than beliefs. In 1998, he explained:

The hierarchy of everything in my life has always bothered me. I'm bothered by power. People, whoever they might be, whether it's the government, or the policeman in the uniform, or the man on the door—they still irk me a bit. From school, from the first nun that belted me—people used to think of the nice sweet little ladies—they used to knock the fuck out of you, in the most cruel way that they could. They'd find bits of your body that were vulnerable to intense pain—grabbing you by the ear, or by the nose, and lift you, and say 'Don't cry!' It's very hard not to cry. I mean, not from emotion, but pain. The priests were the same. And I sit and watch politicians with great cynicism, total cynicism.

At the end of his act, Allen always signed off with the words "Goodnight, thank you, and may your God go with you."

== Personal life ==
Allen was a well-liked bon vivant. Carolyn Soutar in her biography describes a meal at The Golden Century in Sydney "which ended up with Patrick Hockey and Dave taking all the clutter off the table and turning the tablecloth into this huge piece of art. Everyone piled in and drew on it as well. Between the soy-sauce stains and the wonderful artwork by Patrick and Dave it was really stunning. Dave finished the evening by walking out of the restaurant wrapped in this tablecloth, wearing it like a toga."

He married English actress Judith Stott in 1964. The couple had a daughter, Jane (born 1965), and a son, Edward James Tynan O'Mahony (born 1968), who later became a comedian under the name Ed Allen. Allen was also the stepfather of Stott's son Jonathan. The marriage ended in divorce in 1983.

Allen began dating Karin Stark in 1986, and married her in 2003. The couple had a son, Cullen, who was born six weeks after Allen's death.

Allen's hobbies included painting, about which he became increasingly enthusiastic in his later years. His first exhibition, Private Views, was held in Edinburgh in 2001.

== Death and legacy ==
One of Allen's trademarks was his on-stage smoking, which reflected his daily personal usage. He used to joke that he 'Smoked between smokes'. In the 1980s he began suffering from emphysema and had to reduce his work load for some time. The cigarette was absent from his act from then on and he became a paranoid hater of the smell of cigarette smoke. His emphysema may have contributed to his death on 10 March 2005, at the age of 68. He died peacefully in his sleep as a result of sudden arrhythmic death syndrome at his home in Kensington, west London.

Highly regarded in Britain, Allen's comic technique and style had a lasting influence on many young British comedians including Jimmy Carr. His targets were often figures of authority, his style was observational rather than gag-driven, and his language was frequently ripe; as such, he was a progenitor for the "alternative" comedians of the 1980s. Stewart Lee has cited Allen as an influence.

In his native Ireland, he always remained somewhat controversial. His mocking of the Catholic Church made him unpopular amongst some Irish Catholics, while his mocking of the Ulster Protestant leader Ian Paisley made him unpopular amongst many Protestants in Northern Ireland.

In a 2017 interview with Howard Stern, Adam Sandler cited Allen as one of his first comedic influences when he saw his act at the Nevele Hotel at the age of 10.

A dramatisation of Allen's life and career, entitled Dave Allen At Peace, was shown on RTÉ One and BBC Two in 2018, with Aidan Gillen portraying Allen. In November 2026, Channel Five reprised this as "homage" to Allen.

== Television ==
- Tonight with Dave Allen (1963)
- The Dave Allen Show (1968)
- Dave Allen At Large (1971-1979)
- The Dave Allen Show in Australia (1975–1977)
- Dave Allen (1990)

== Bibliography ==
- Graham McCann (ed.) The Essential Dave Allen London: Hodder & Stoughton, 2005. ISBN 0-340-89945-X.
- Carolyn Soutar Dave Allen: The Biography London: Orion, 2005. ISBN 0752873814.
