= Irish Monthly =

Magazine published in Ireland from 1873 to 1954

- Former editors: Matthew Russell
- Categories: Literature, social issues, popular culture, religion
- Frequency: Monthly
- First issue: 1873
- Final issue: 1954
- Country: Ireland
- Based in: Dublin
- Language: English
- ISSN: 2009-2113
- OCLC: 9615097

The Irish Monthly was an Irish Catholic magazine founded in Dublin, Ireland in July 1873. Until 1920 it had the sub-title A Magazine of General Literature.

== History ==
The magazine was founded by Matthew Russell, who was its editor for almost 40 years from 1873. The first two years of the magazine were difficult, but in 1875 Rosa Mulholland arrived to help out, followed shortly by friends of Russell, including Aubrey de Vere, John O'Hagan and Sarah Atkinson, which helped put the magazine on a firm footing.

Among the early contributors to the magazine were Denis Florence MacCarthy, Lady Georgiana Fullerton, Charles Gavan Duffy, Stephen Brown, Emily Hickey, Dora Sigerson, T. A. Finlay, Archbishop Healy, D. Bearne, Rose Kavanagh, John O'Leary and his sister Ellen. These were members of the Irish cultural and nationalistic circles of the time, which included the likes of W. B. Yeats and George Sigerson, and many young writers flocked to the magazine as an outlet for their talents.

From the beginning there were many Protestant contributors, among them Mary Fagan and Frances Wynne. Matthew Russell was impressed by Wynne's poems, and offered to pay for the publication of some; a collection, called Whisper!, was published in 1891.

Among the writers "discovered" by the Irish Monthly are: Oscar Wilde, M. E. Francis, Katharine Tynan, Hilaire Belloc, Patrick Augustine Sheehan, and Alice Furlong. Gabriel Fallon was a theatre critic from 1926 to 1954.

The Irish Monthly ceased publication in 1954.

Matthew Russell
