= Hugh Thomson =

Irish illustrator (1860–1920)

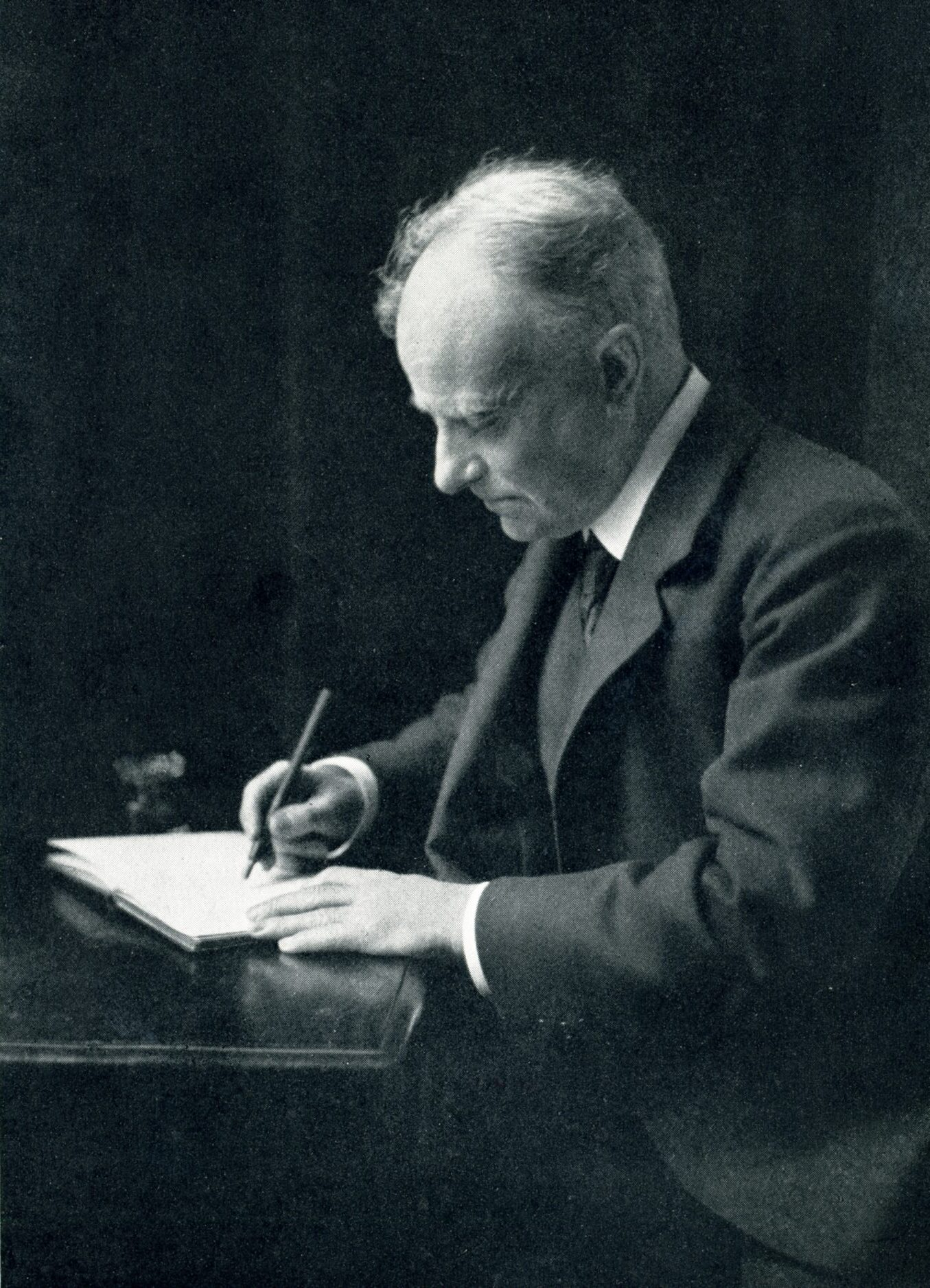
- Thomson in 1912
- Born: 1 June 1860; Kingsgate Street, Coleraine, County Londonderry, Ireland
- Died: 7 May 1920 (aged 59); 8 Patten Road, Wandsworth Common, London, England
- Known for: Illustration
- Movement: Cranford School

Hugh Thomson RI (1 June 1860 – 7 May 1920) was an Irish illustrator. He is best known for his pen-and-ink illustrations of works by authors such as Jane Austen, Charles Dickens, and J. M. Barrie. Thomson inaugurated the Cranford School of illustration with the publication of the 1891 Macmillan reissue of Mrs. Gaskell's Cranford.

== Biography ==
Thomson was born on 1 June 1860, in Coleraine, to tea merchant John Thomson (1822–1894) and shopkeeper Catherine (née Andrews) (d. 1871). He was the eldest of their three surviving children. Although he had no formal artistic training, as a young boy he would often fill his schoolbooks with drawings of horses, dogs, and ships. He attended Coleraine Model School, but left at the age of fourteen to work as a clerk at E. Gribbon & Sons, Linen Manufacturers. Years later, his artistic talents were discovered, and in 1877 he was hired by printing and publishing company Marcus Ward & Co.

On 29 December 1884, Thomson married Jessie Naismith Miller in Belfast. Soon afterwards they moved back to London for Thomson's career. They had one son together, John, born in 1886.

In 1911, he and his family moved to Sidcup, hoping to improve their "ever delicate health". Thomson's correspondence reflects the fact that he missed being close to the National Gallery and the museums where he usually compiled research for his illustrations. During World War I, demand for Thomson's work decreased to a few propaganda pamphlets and some commissions from friends. By 1917, Thomson had fallen into financial hardship and he was obliged to take a job with the Board of Trade, where he worked until 1919.

Thomson died of heart disease at his home in Wandsworth Common on 7 May 1920.

== Career ==
At age 17, Thomson joined the art department at Marcus Ward & Co. There his mentor was John Vinycomb, head of the art department. Vinycomb and Thomson's cousin, Mrs. William H. Dodd, encouraged his artistic development during the first years of his career.

Thomson's artistic ambitions led him to London in 1883 where he became a leading contributor to The English Illustrated Magazine. He first worked for the magazine with Randolph Caldecott on the 1885–86 issue, and later collaborated with Herbert Railton on the 1887–88 issue. His style at the time is said to be in the "straight tradition of Caldecott".

Thomson also gained praise and influenced many young artists through his book illustrations. He notably illustrated editions of William Shakespeare, Jane Austen, and Charles Dickens. His illustrations for Elizabeth Gaskell's Cranford (1891) inspired a slew of publishers to produce a series of gift books in a similar style ("crown octavo with three edges gilt, bound in dark green cloth, front and spine heavily stamped in gold"). Between 1886 and 1900, he illustrated a set of small classics for Macmillans and Kegan Paul. Much of his work during that period consisted of elaborately illustrated gift books and reprints of popular classics. Thomson's most popular illustrations were "fine line drawing of rural characters and gentle countrified society".

His works were featured in a number of exhibitions during his lifetime, including an 1899 exhibit at the Birmingham and Midland Institute and a 1910 exhibit of his watercolour drawings for Shakespeare's The Merry Wives of Windsor at The Leicester Galleries in London. (Note: A handsome oversized volume with his paintings laid in was produced for the exhibition. See The Merry Wives of Windsor by William Shakespeare with Illustrations by Hugh Thomson (London: William Heinemann, 1910).) His illustrations were also featured in an 1891 exhibit with fellow illustrator Kate Greenaway at the Fine Art Society. (Note: Thomson exhibited as follows: 194 works at the Fine Art Society, 181 works at the Leicester Galleries, five works at the London Salon, and 32 works at Walker's Gallery, London.)

=== Methods ===
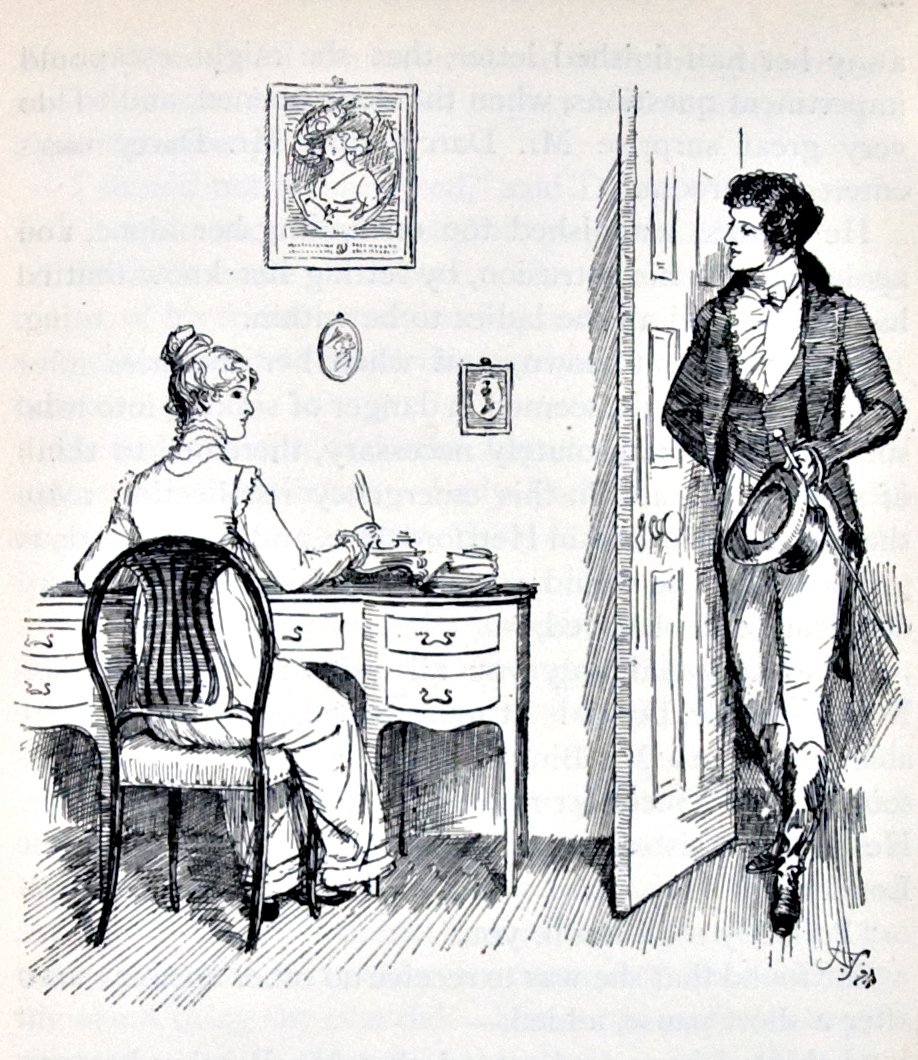
An illustration from Pride and Prejudice

Thomson is best known for his pen-and-ink illustrations. He prepared most of his work in black and white until the early years of the 20th century, but would sometimes tint pieces for exhibits. The earliest known example of this was for the 1899 Birmingham and Midland Institute exhibition, where he colored the Cranford illustrations he had first drawn eight years earlier. Throughout his career Thomson occasionally dabbled with watercolours, but only used colour in his illustrations in response to his publishers' demand. His first book illustrations prepared and printed fully in colour were for the last two books in the Cranford series, Scenes of Clerical Life (1906) and Silas Marner (1907).

When working on a new illustration, Thomson would research his subject in the British Museum and the Victoria and Albert Museum. He would often take detailed notes on costumes, furniture, old prints and architectural records. His attention to detail can be seen in his sketchbooks, which include pages devoted to the changing styles of ladies' bonnets and descriptions of "the details of a cavalry officer's regimentals, together with a series of studies of how such an officer would hold the reins of his mount." When illustrating a series of pieces set in the same location, Thomson would maintain the details of each room, hallway or facade, drawing them from different angles throughout the publication.

Thomson was often praised for his ability to "project himself into a story". Much of his work has become inseparable from the publications themselves. Such is the case with his illustrations for Pride and Prejudice and the other Austen novels. When J. M. Barrie's Quality Street was published with Thomson's illustrations in 1913, the art critic for The Daily News stated, "The Barrie–Thomson combination is as perfect in its way as that of Gilbert and Sullivan".

Thomson was elected RI, a member of the Royal Society of Painters in Water Colours, in 1897 and retired in 1907.

== The Cranford School ==
Thomson was the first of the Cranford School of illustrators who abandoned the 1890s style of Beardsley for the delicacy of an eighteenth-century mode. The 'Cranford School' of illustration was not so much a 'school' with a common training, but more of a style which celebrated a sentimental, pre-industrial notion of ‘old England'. The style was named for Thomson's illustrations of the Macmillan reissue of Mrs. Gaskell's Cranford. Cranford was the first of a series of 24 volumes, of which Thomson illustrated 11. Felmingham includes the Cranford School within a broader movement that he called the Wig and Powder School which he states reflected an aspect of contemporary taste that . . . is sometimes called the 'Queen Ann revival'. Felmingham included the popularity of such architectural features as high-pitched roof, Flemish gables, and white or green painted sash windows as an outward expression of the revival. Jenkins states that the term Wig and Powder School is loosely equivalent to the Cranford School and that the latter term was mostly used between 1890 and 1914. (Note: Jenkins also notes that the school is sometime also called that Queen Anne Revival, a term especially associated with the watercolour work that sometimes accompanied the delicate pen drawings, such as Thomson's colour drawings for the 1898 Cranford, online at the British Library.)

The style was a nostalgic, affectionate and slightly whimsical approach to historical themes. and was distinguished by graphic nostalgia for a philistinism that was no more. The members of the school had all been fired by the literature, art, costume or atmosphere of England in the eighteenth century and became dealers in nostalgia on a very large scale. It was a style of illustration harking back to pre-industrial rural England, which specialized in the nostalgic recreation of a by-gone golden era before the ravages of industrialization. Cooke notes that the style involved the careful representation of Regency dress and interiors, pastoral settings and sharp characterization which was based on a close reading of the text. The emergence of the Cranford School style was only possible because photo-mechanical reproduction of drawings allowed the fine pen lines distinctive of the school to be reproduced, which was impossible with the older technique of wood engravings.

Thomson was the originator of the school. Other members of the school were:

- C. E. Brock RI (1870–1938)
- H. M. Brock RI (1875–1960)
- Chris Hammond (1860–1900), who signed her work Chris Hammond.
- Fred Pegram RI (1870–1937)
- F. H. Townsend (1868–1920)

=== Thomson's illustration of Cranford ===
The following illustrations by Thomson for the 1891 Macmillan Cranford give some flavour of the book that inaugurated the Cranford School. The book has 111 illustrations in total.

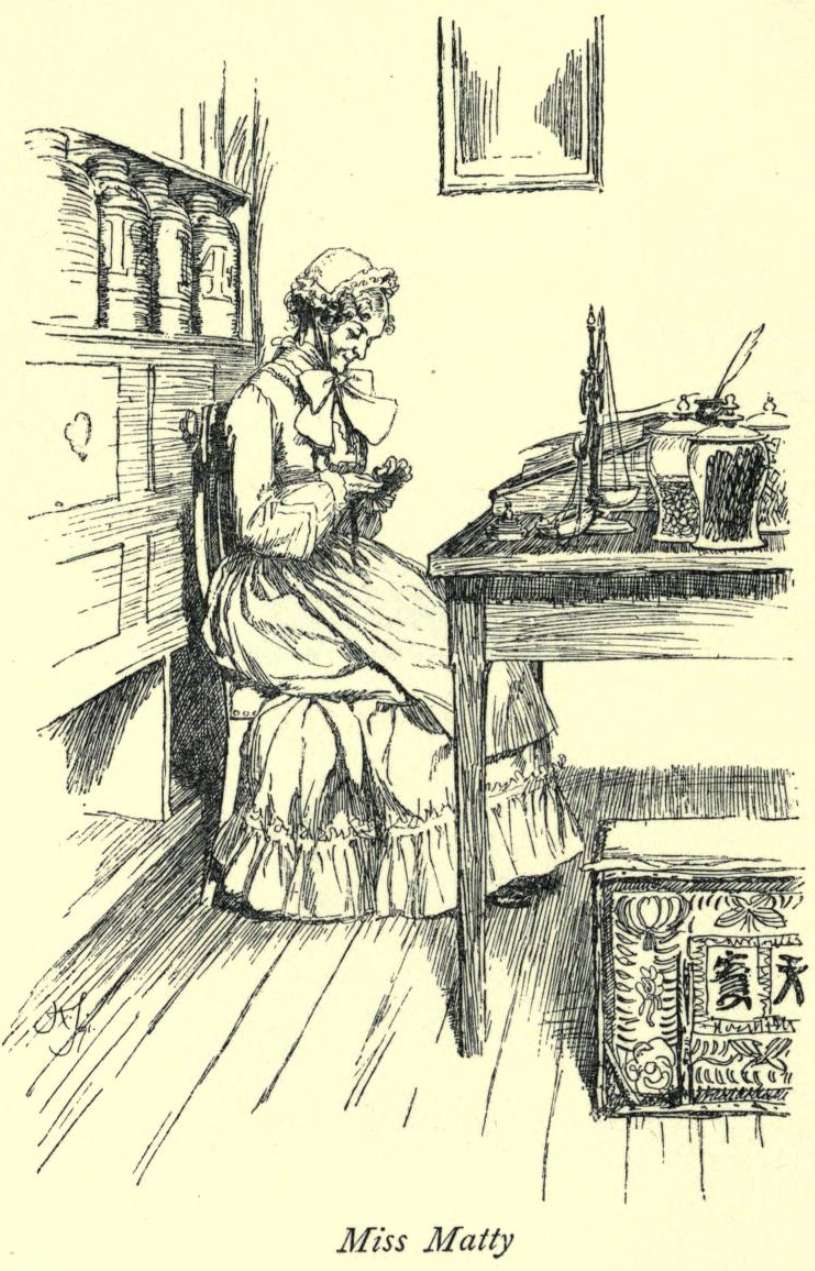
Frontispiece

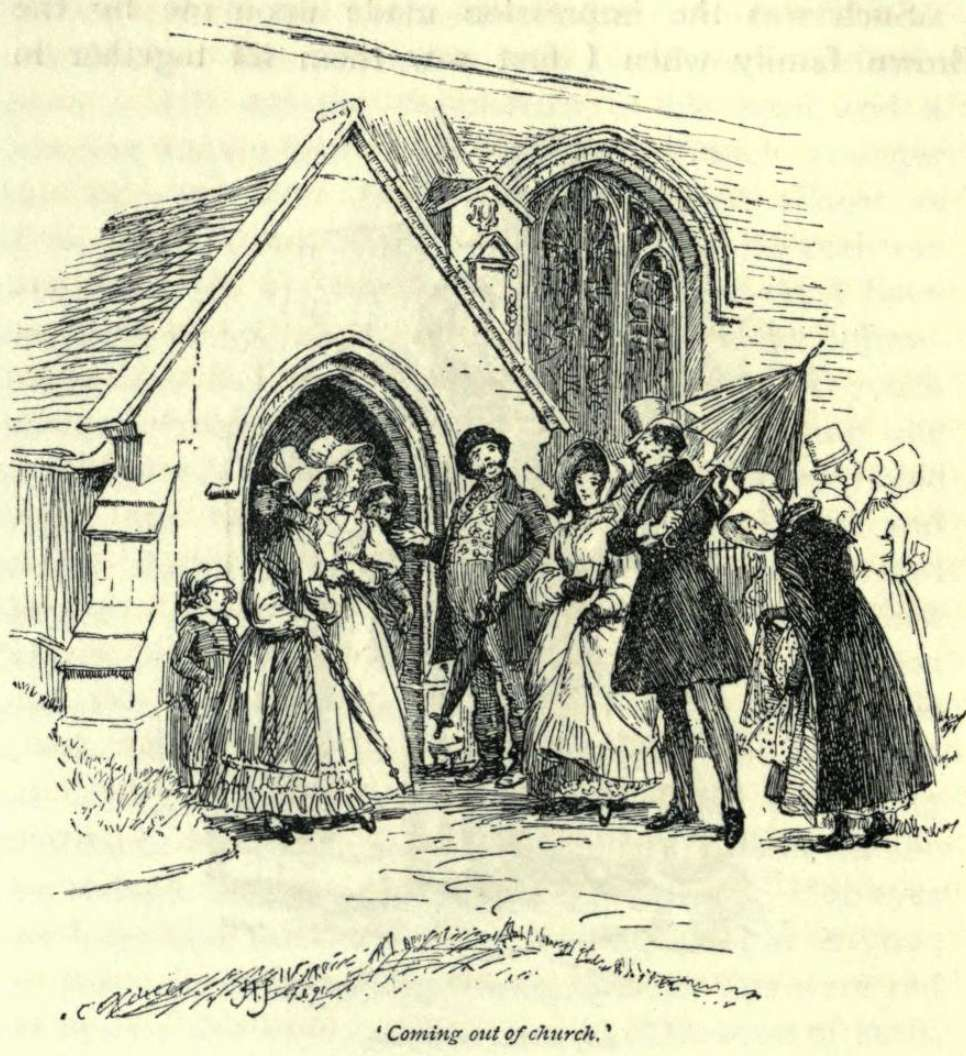
Page 12

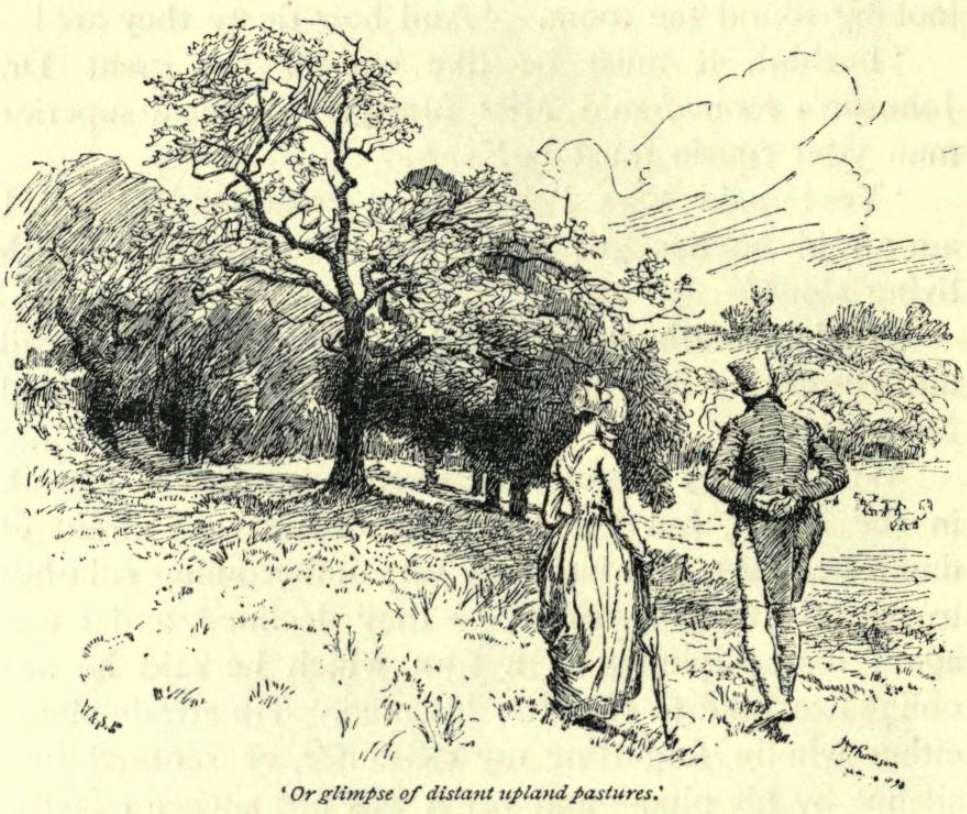
Page 64

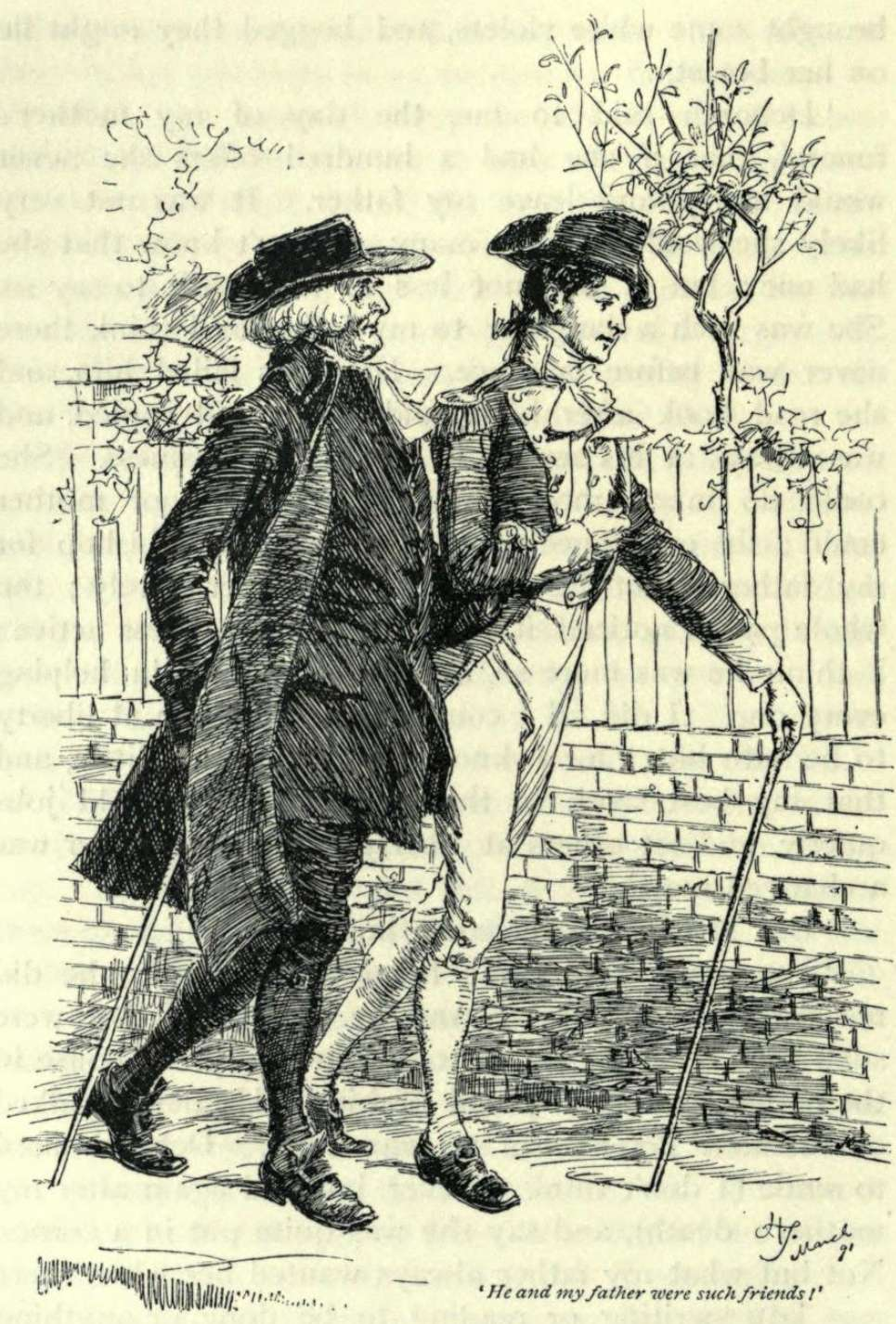
Page 108

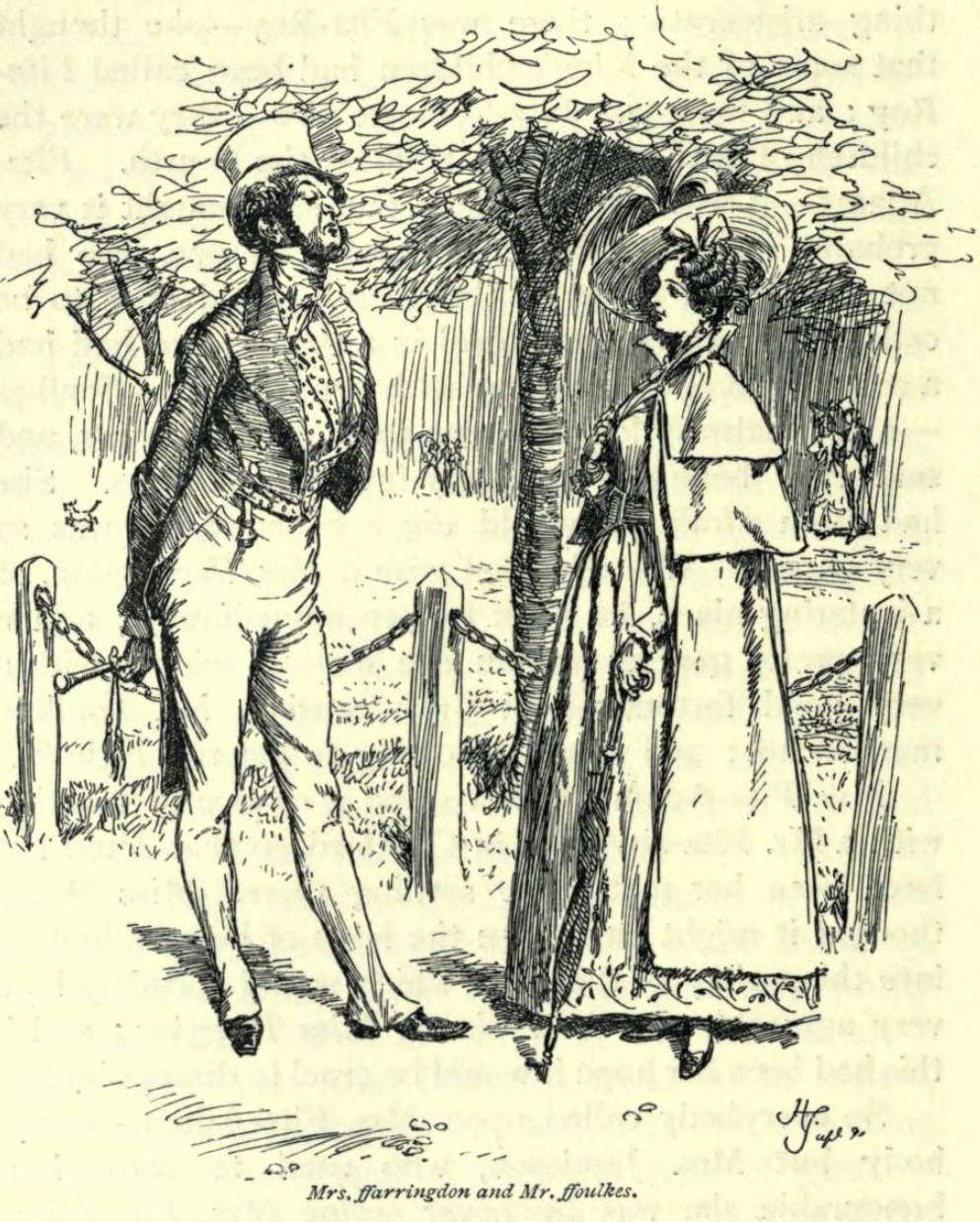
Page 118

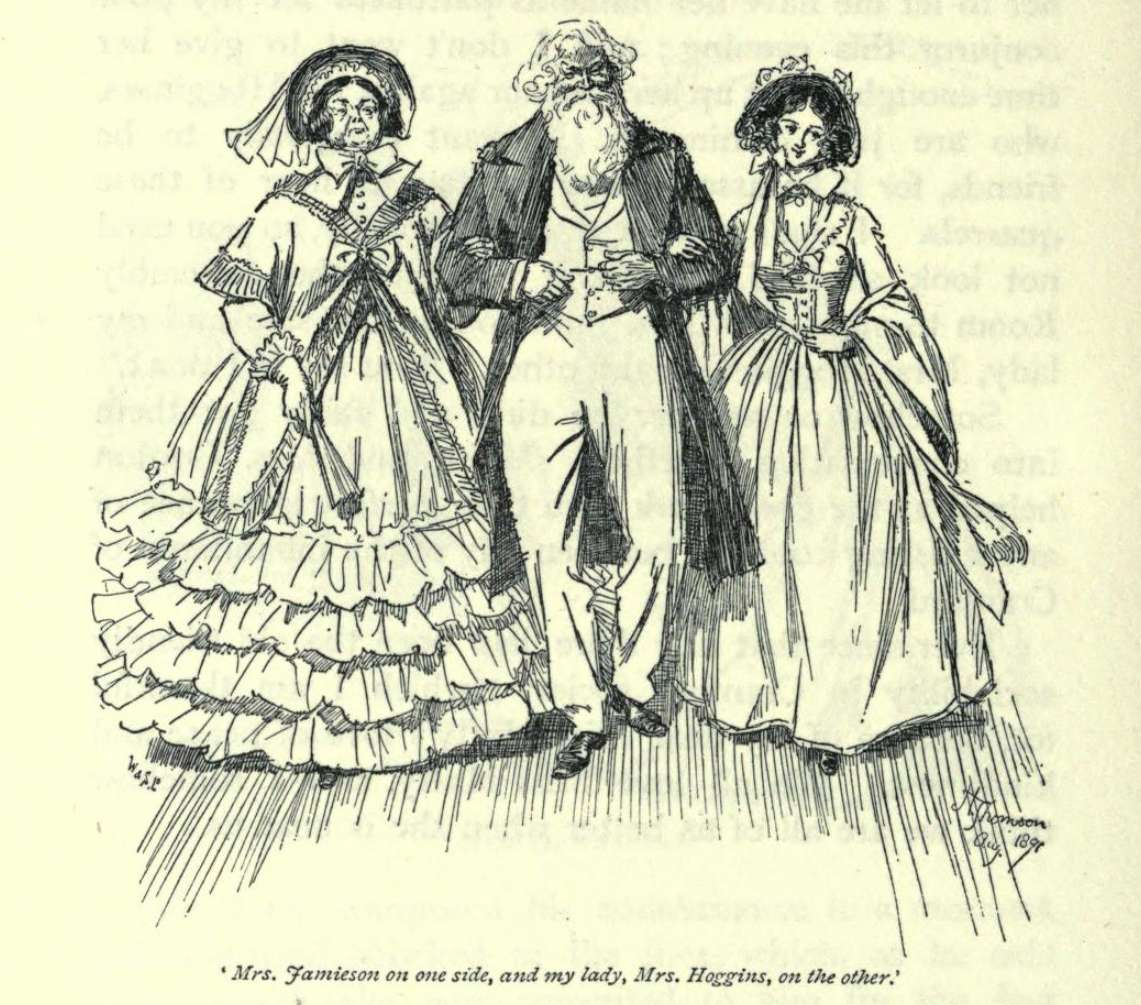
Page 298

== Selected works ==
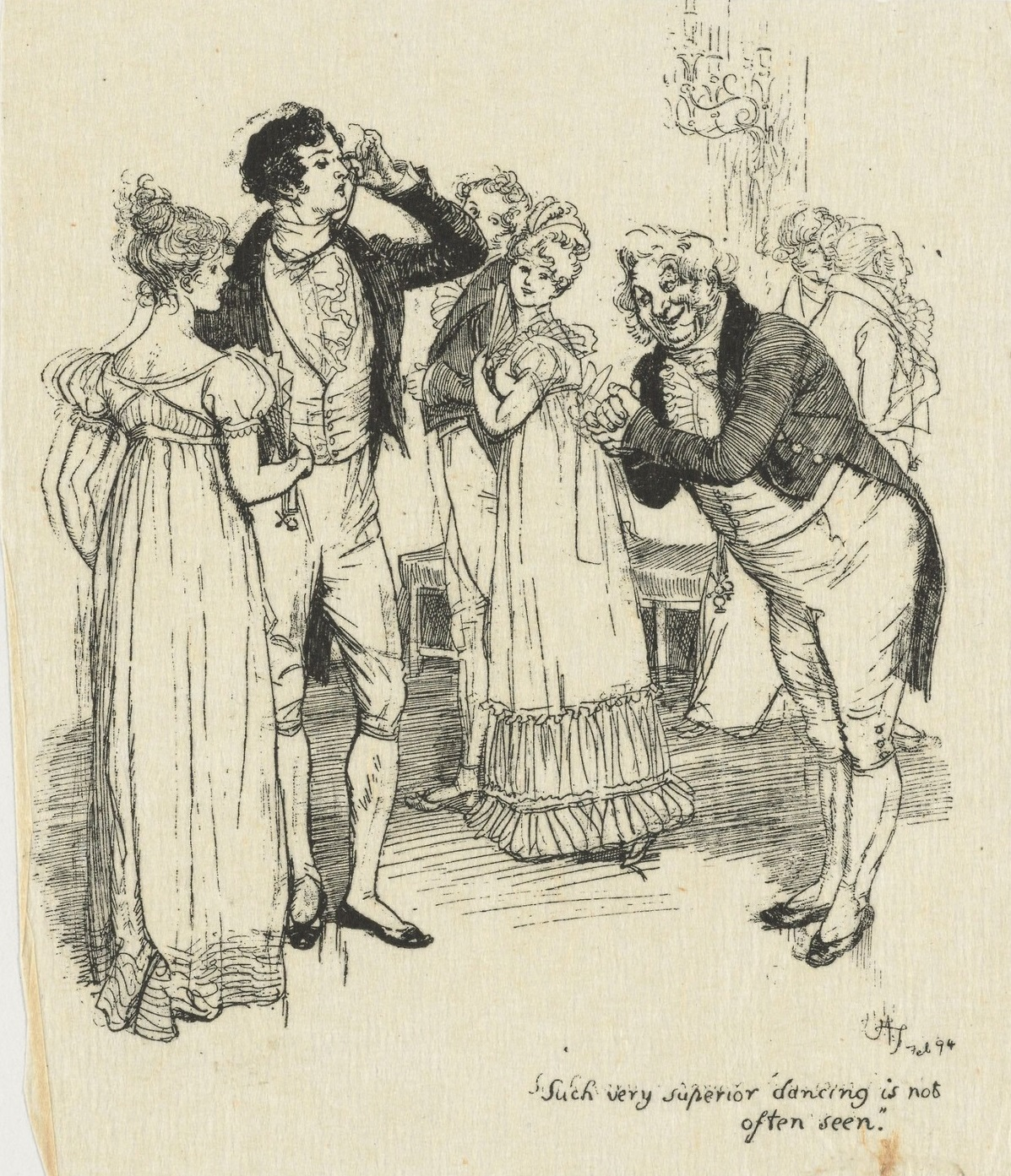
Illustration for Pride and Prejudice, 1894

In total, Thomson illustrated sixty-five books and contributed a large number of illustrations to magazines and other periodicals. The following list of publications includes a number of his works. External links lead to digitized copies on Internet Archive unless otherwise noted.

- Illustrations in The English Illustrated Magazine (first appeared in the 1885–86 issue)
- Days with Sir Roger De Coverley (1886) digital copy
- Coaching Days and Coaching Ways (1888) digital copy
- Cranford (1891) digital copy
- The Vicar of Wakefield (1891) digital copy
- The Ballad of Beau Brocade (1892) digital copy
- Our Village (1893) digital copy
- Pride and Prejudice (1894) digital copy
- The Story of Rosina and other Verses (1895) digital copy
- Emma (1896) digital copy
- Sense and Sensibility (1896) digital copy
- Mansfield Park (1897) digital copy
- Northanger Abbey (1898) digital copy
- Persuasion (1898) digital copy
- The Illustrated Fairy Books (1898)
- Illustrations for twelve volumes in the Highways and Byways series, including Donegal and Antrim (1899) digital copy
- Peg Woffington (1899) digital copy
- A Kentucky Cardinal (1901) digital copy
- The History of Henry Esmond (1905) digital copy
- Illustrations for eleven of the twenty-four volumes in the Cranford series (gift books), including Evelina (1903) digital copy, Scenes of Clerical Life (1906) digital copy, and Silas Marner (1907) digital copy
- As You Like It (1909) digital copy, digital copy
- The Merry Wives of Windsor digital copy
- Quality Street (1913) digital copy
- Tom Brown's Schooldays (1918) digital copy
- An Irish Horse Fair

== Gallery ==
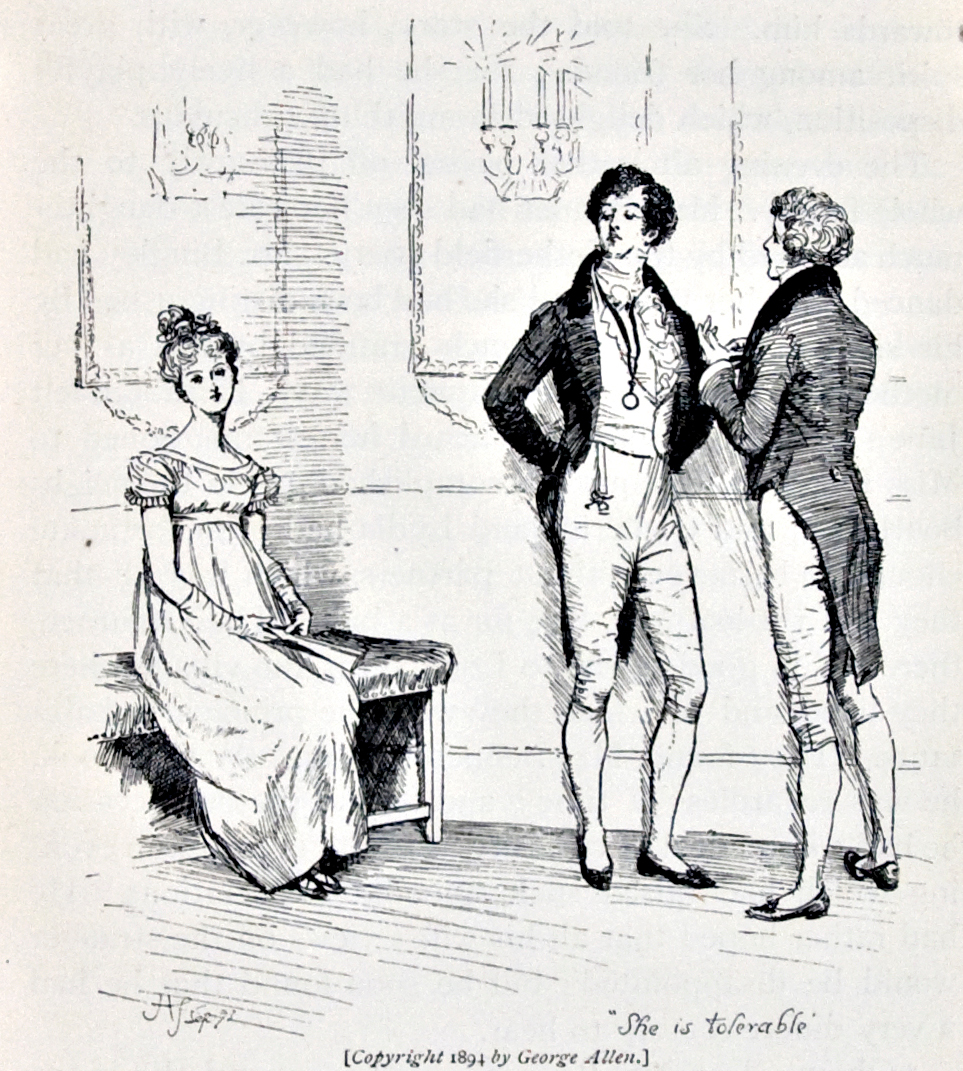
Pride and Prejudice, page 15: "She is tolerable."

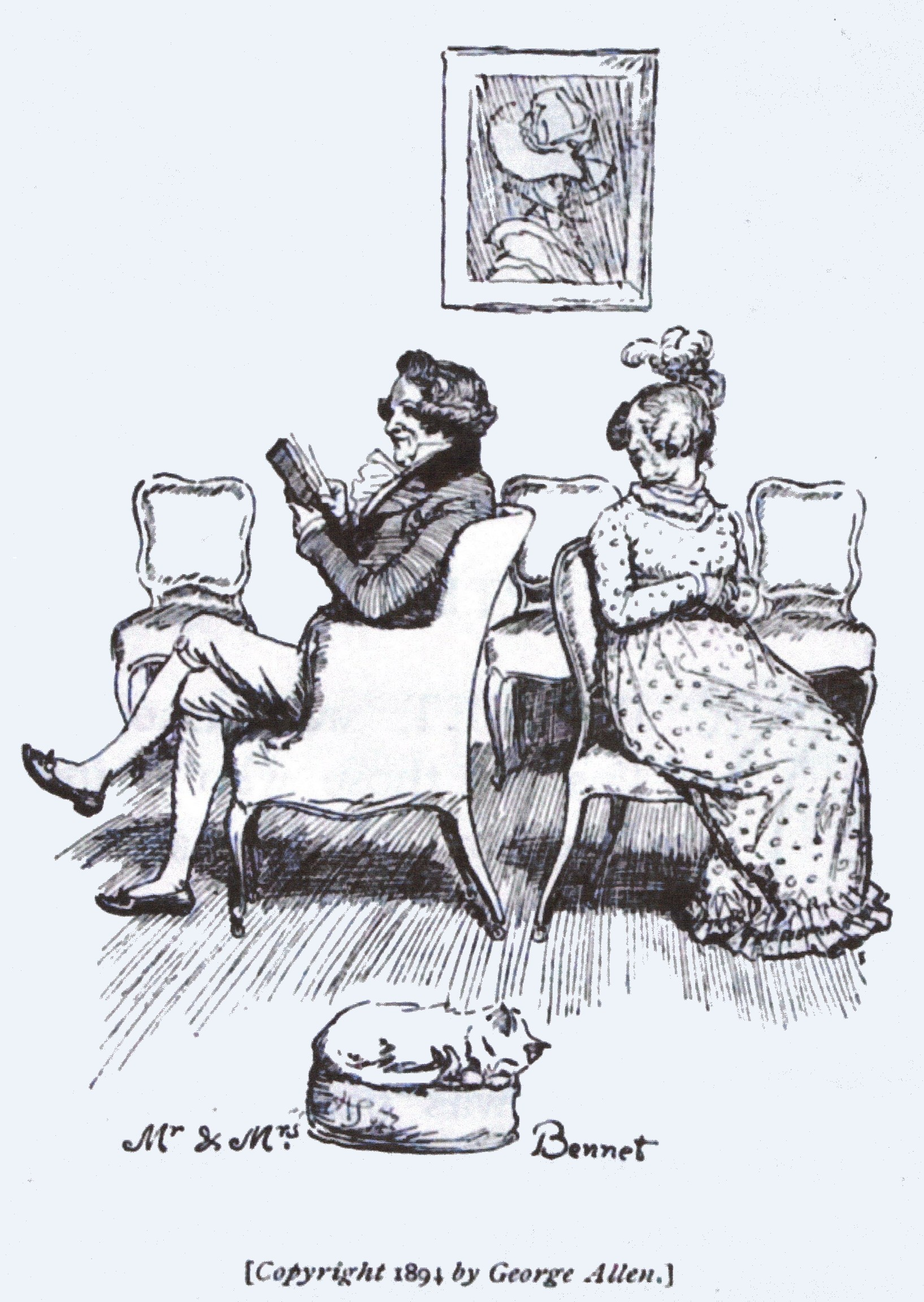
Pride and Prejudice, page 5: Mr. and Mrs. Bennet.

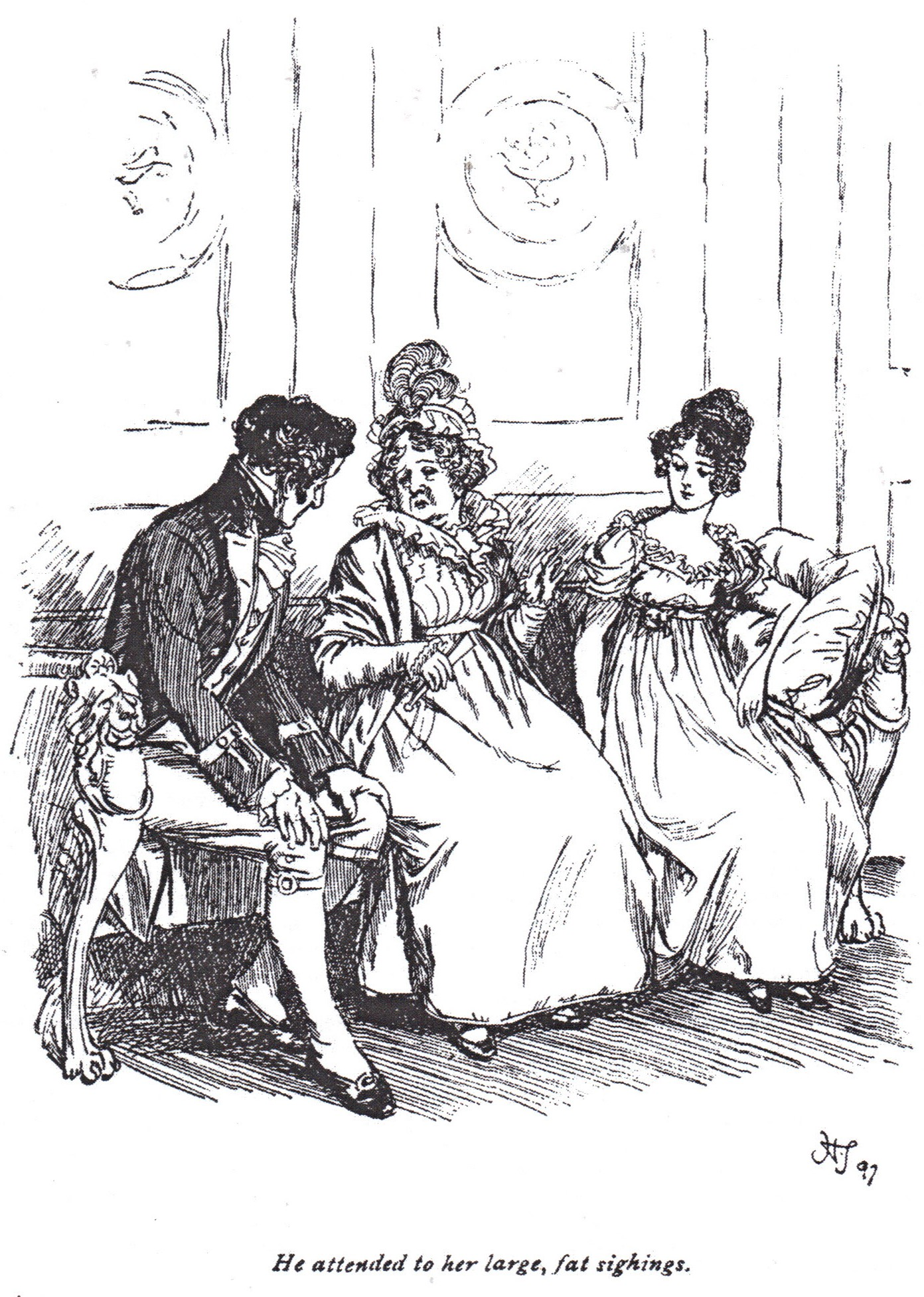
Persuasion, chapter 8: "Captain Wentworth attended to her large fat sighings."

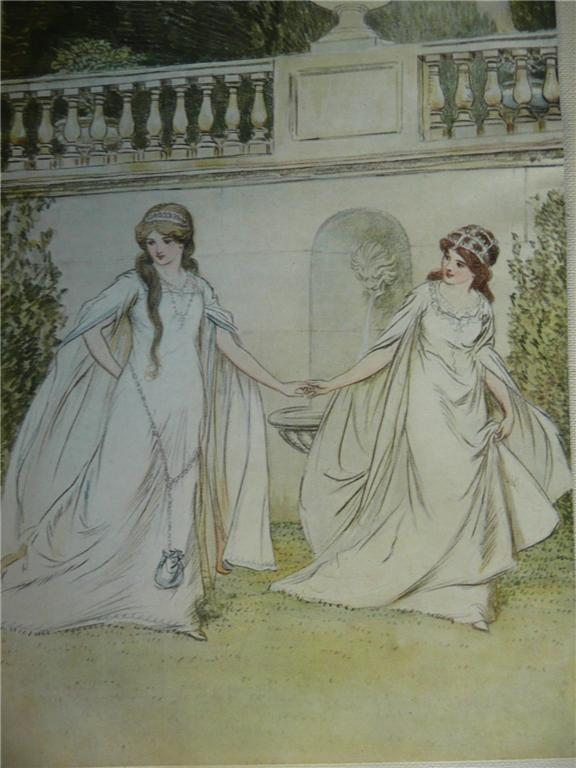
As You Like It, illustration of Rosalind and Celia.

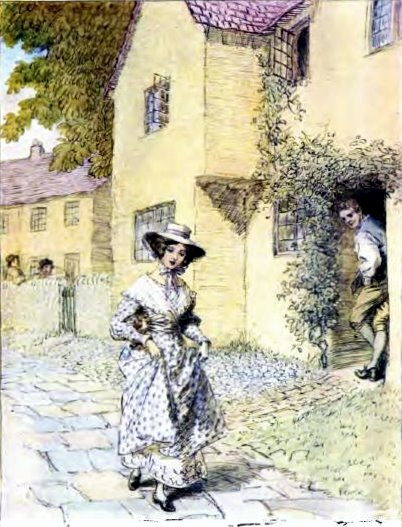
Frontispiece from Scenes of Clerical Life.

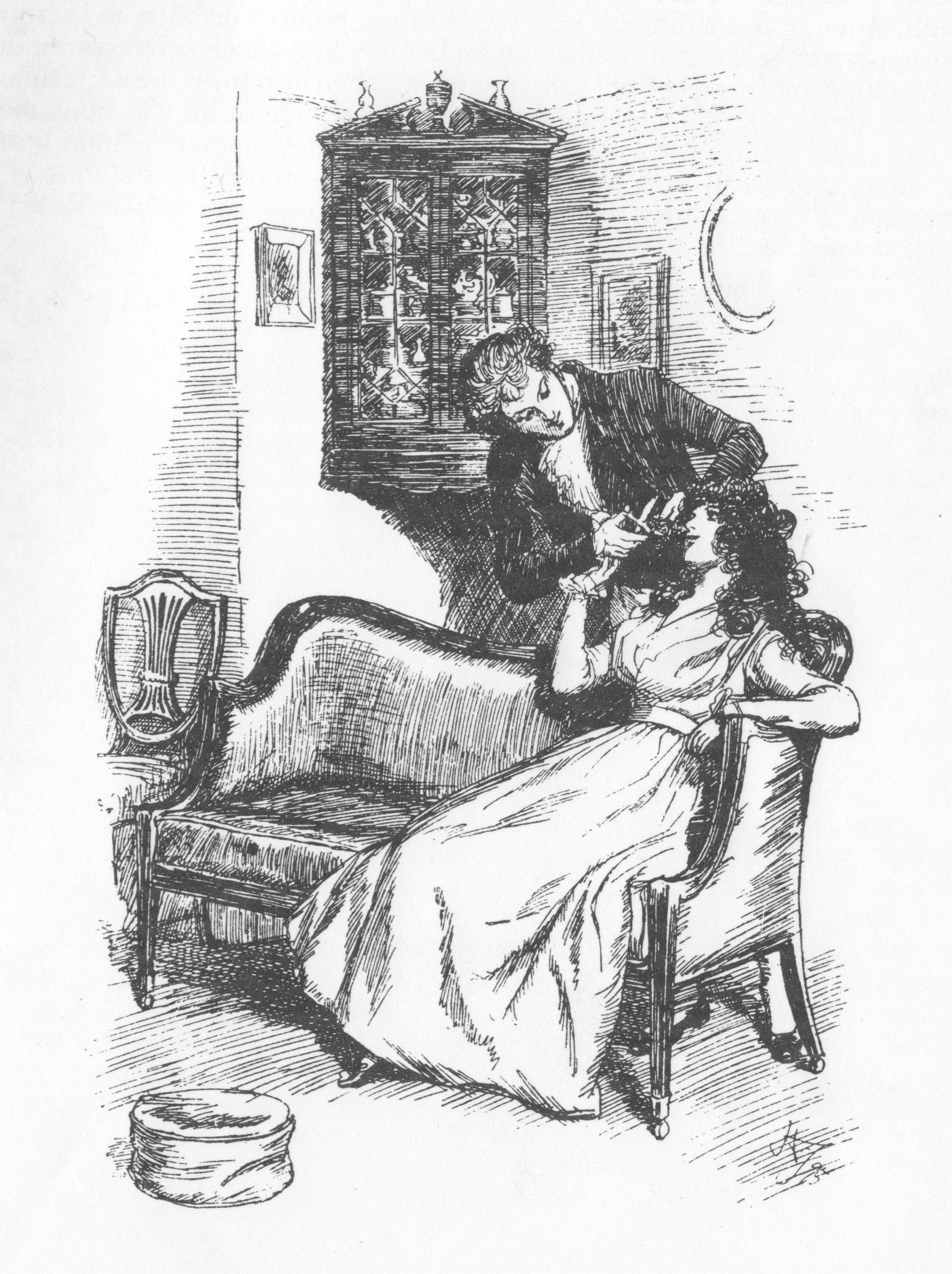
Sense and Sensibility, chapter 12: "He cut off a long lock of her hair."

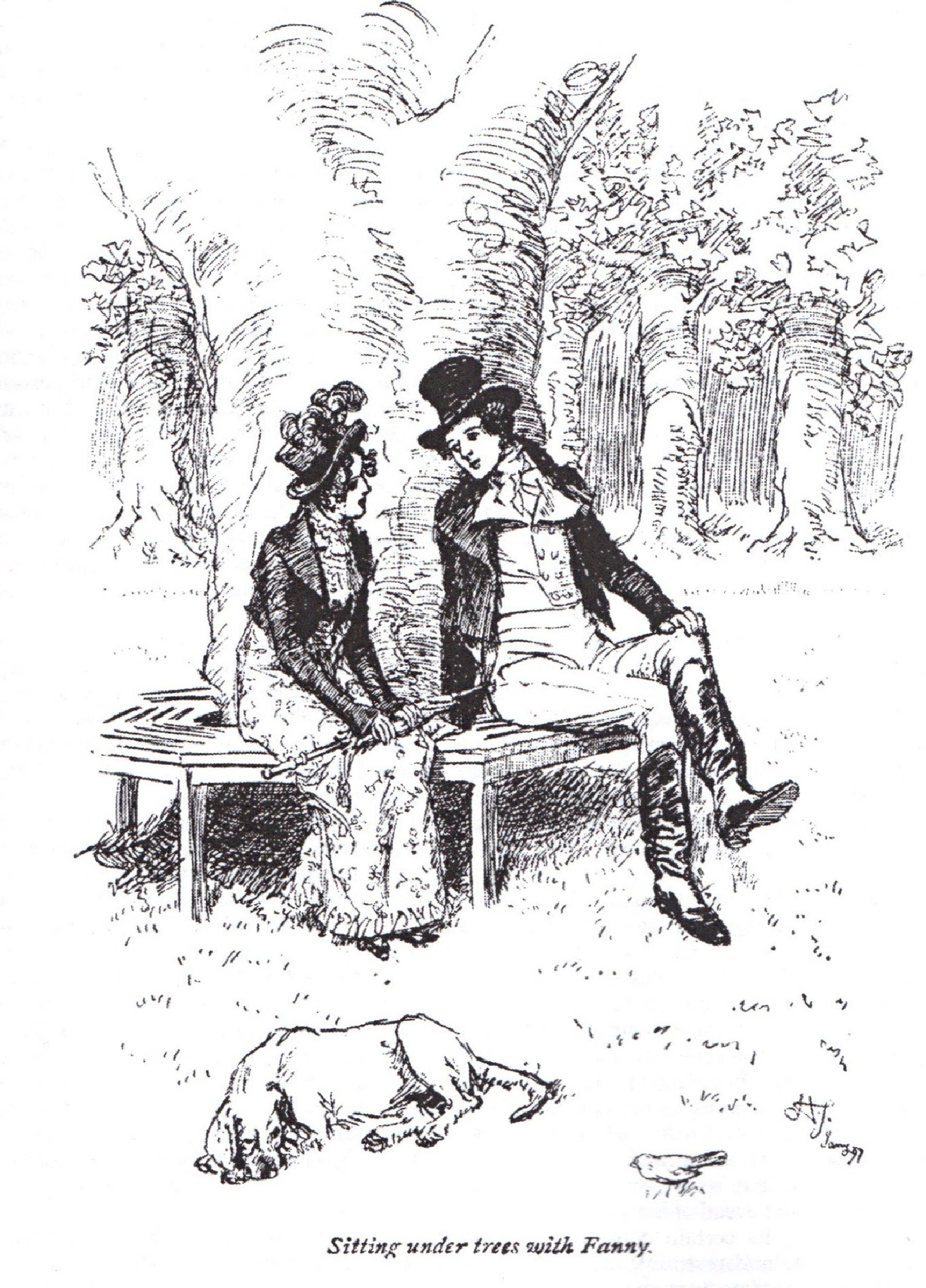
Mansfield Park, chapter 48: "Sitting under trees with Fanny."
