= Frances Wynne =

Irish poet

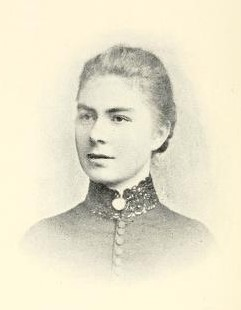
- Born: 1863; Collon, County Louth, Ireland
- Died: 9 August 1893 (aged 29–30); London, England
- Known for: poet

Frances Wynne (1863 – August 1893) was a 19th-century Irish poet.

== Life ==
Frances Alice Wynne was born in 1863 in Collon, a village near Drogheda, County Louth. Her father, Alfred Henry Wynne, worked as the estate agent for the Hawkins Whitshed estate. She was educated privately and at Alexandra College, Dublin.

Wynne started writing poetry at a young age, and became very close friend with Katharine Tynan. Through Tynan, she made the acquaintance of Matthew Russell, editor of the Irish Monthly, who was impressed with her writing and published her poems in the magazine. She went on to contribute to Longman's Magazine, The Providence Journal and The Spectator. Matthew Russell offered to pay for the publication of her poems, and a collection, called Whisper!, was published by Messrs. Kegan Paul in 1891. It was very well received by the critics.

She married her second cousin, Henry Wynne, in 1891. The couple moved to London, first to Southampton Row and then to the East End when Henry became a rector there. She died there after giving birth to their first child on 9 August 1893. Their son survived.

Shortly after her death, Tynan wrote the elegy "A Young Mother" in her memory. She stated that Wynne was "greatly loved by children, and the poor, and animals, and by her social inferiors."

Two books, The True Level (1948) and Eastward of All (1945), have been incorrectly attributed to Wynne, when they were the work of another Frances Wynne who was a Northern Irish prose writer.
