= Rose Moutray Read =

British author and horticulturist

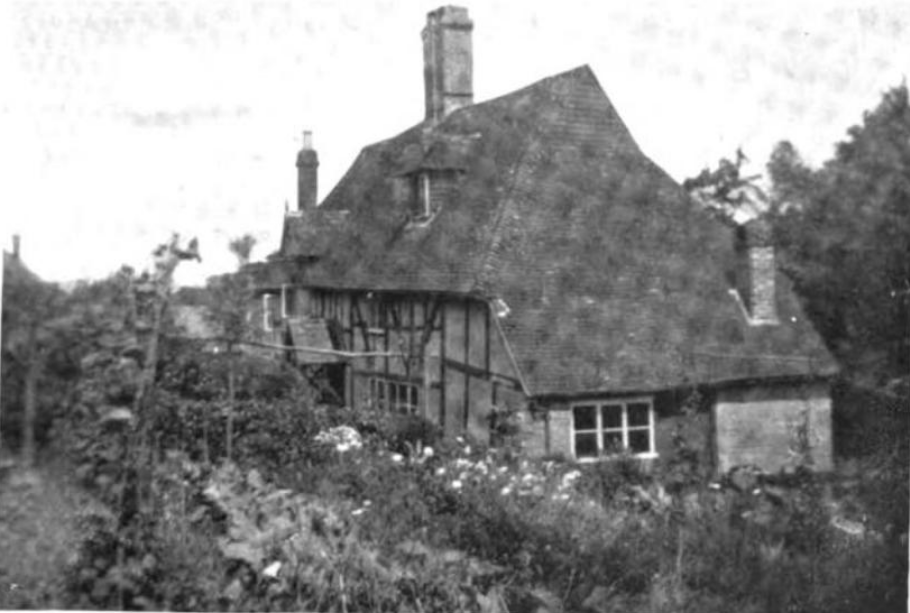
Rose Moutray Read's house near Wadhurst

Rose Hamilton Moutray Read FRHS (1870–1947) was a British author and horticulturist. She wrote a popular guide in the Highways and Byways series, to Hampshire, published in 1908, and a book on gardening. She was a Fellow of the Royal Horticultural Society, and editor of the Gardener's Year Book for 1930. She was also a member of The Folklore Society, contributing to the journal. Her youngest brother was Anketell Moutray Read, who earned a Victoria Cross during the First World War.

== Life and family ==
Rose Hamilton Moutray Read was born in 1870, the eldest child of Edith and John Moutray Read, who was a Lt Colonel of the 4th Cheshire Regiment. Her youngest brother was Anketell Moutray Read, who earned a Victoria Cross during the First World War.

== Work ==
Under the pseudonym DH Moutray Read, she wrote the popular "Highways and Byways of Hampshire" volume in the Highways & Byways series, in this instance illustrated by portrait painter Arthur Bentley Connor. Moutray Read also wrote a book on the creation of her own garden, with illustrations, plans and photographs. She began gardening with a ten rod allotment in Cottenham Park, Wimbledon, and soon realised that she could not manage without a garden. She purchased an old house and garden of about three quarters of an acre near Wadhurst in Sussex, which was grassland when Moutray Read purchased it.

Moutray Read was a Fellow of the Royal Horticultural Society, and edited the Gardener's Year Book for 1930. Moutray Read was also a member of the Folklore Society, presenting a number of papers, and reviewing books for the society's journal Folklore.

== Publications ==
- Rose Moutray Read (1908), Highways and Byways in Hampshire, Highways and Byways, Illustrator: Arthur Bentley Connor, Macmillan Publishers, Wikidata Q67189102
- Rose Moutray Read (1923), One garden; the intimate chronicle of its making, London, Wikidata Q104433742
- Rose Moutray Read, ed. (1930), The Gardener's Year Book 1930, London: Philip Allan & Co Limited, Wikidata Q104433960
