= Hester Sigerson Piatt =

Irish republican and writer (1870–June 1939)

- Born: Anna Hester Sigerson; 13 June 1870; Rathmines, County Dublin, Ireland
- Died: 16 June 1939 (aged 69); Dublin, Ireland

Hester Sigerson Piatt (13 June 1870 – 16 June 1939), was an Irish poet and republican journalist.

== Life ==
Piatt was born Anna Hester Sigerson, known to family as Hetty, in Dublin to Hester Varian and George Sigerson. Her father was a doctor, poet and senator, her mother was also a writer as was her sister Dora Sigerson Shorter. In about 1900 Piatt married the American Vice and Deputy Consul in Ireland, Arthur Donn Piatt. They had two children, Eibhlín Piatt Humphreys and Donn Sigerson Piatt. Her husband died in Ireland in 1914 aged 47. Piatt stayed in Ireland living in her father's house. She was a member of Cumann na mBan and covered topics like the Charles Kickham Memoir in her writings.

Piatt worked on the Weekly Freeman, taking over as "Uncle Remus" from Rose Kavanagh, a job which earned her a pound a week. She also wrote for the Lyceum, Irish Fireside and The Weekly Register as well as contributing to other American and English journals. Her poetry was published in Yeats's Irish anthology and Padraic Colum’s anthology of Irish verse.

== Bibliography ==
- A ruined race; or, The last MacManus of Drumroosk, 1889.
- Anne Devlin: an outline of her story, 1917.
- In a poet's garden, 1920.
- The passing years: a book of verses, 1935.
- The golden quest, and other stories, 1940.

== Sources ==
- "Hester Sigerson". Ricorso.
- "Dictionary of Irish Biography". Cambridge University Press.
- "PIATT, Donn Sigerson (1905–1970)". ainm.ie (in Irish). 8 November 2017.
- Atkinson, D. (2016). The Selected Letters of Katharine Tynan: Poet and Novelist. Cambridge Scholars Publishing. ISBN 978-1-4438-9301-5.
- "Poetry, and the Gaelic Athletic Association". The Irish Times. 21 March 2013.
- Kestenbaum, Lawrence (1 July 1996). "The Political Graveyard: Piatt family of North Bend, Ohio". The Political Graveyard.
- "Sigerson, Hester (d. 1898)", Encyclopedia.com, 14 November 2018
- Piatt, Hester Sigerson (8 August 1928). "Reining in the Rogue Royal of Arabia".
- Phelan, Mark (8 May 2013). Irish responses to Fascist Italy, 1919-1932 (PhD thesis). NUI Galway. hdl:10379/3401.
- "Irish Genealogy" (PDF). Irish Genealogy.
