= Charles Hill Dick =

Scottish minister and author

Charles Hill Dick (27 December 1875 – 1952) was a Scottish minister and author. He wrote Highways and Byways in Galloway and Carrick as part of the Macmillan Highways and Byways series and edited Izaak Walton and Charles Cotton's The Compleat Angler. Dick sustained a close friendship with John Buchan whom he met at Hutchesons' Grammar School and the correspondence between the two is a major source for of biographical and intellectual information about Buchan. He died in 1952.

== Ministry ==
Dick's first permanent appointment was at Bellshill McDonald Memorial Church in Hamilton in 1906. In 1910 he was moved to St Mary's in Moffat. In 1913 he travelled to the Russian steppes. He was minister of Greyfriars in Port of Spain, Trinidad until 1924. Following this he took up two positions in Shetland, first in Unst and then in Cunningsburgh.

== Works ==
- The Compleat Angler of Walton and Cotton: Edited, with an Introduction by Charles Hill Dick (1895)
- Highways and Byways in Galloway and Carrick (1916)
