= Tipperary Leader =

The Tipperary Leader was a title used by a number of publications in Co. Tipperary, Ireland.

In 1854 Maurice Leyne (a Young Irelander and Grandnephew of Daniel O'Connell) became editor of the Tipperary Leader newspaper, this was a weekly publication, published in Thurles, founded by priests in the diocese. Following Leynes death in 1854, William Kenneally revived the title and edited the Tipperary Leader for the next two years. It disappeared because of a libel action of £2000 against its editor.

The title was revived gain in 1880 and published until 1885.

The future Anti-Parnellite Nationalist MP for North Monaghan Daniel MacAleese contributed to the paper.
