= Pamela Hinkson =

Irish novelist (1900–1982), daughter of Katharine Tynan

Pamela Hinkson (19 November 1900 – 26 May 1982) was an Irish writer.

Hinkson was the daughter of Katharine Tynan and barrister Henry Albert Hinkson (1865–1919). She was widely published and her book, The Ladies' Road (1932), sold over 100,000 copies in the Penguin edition.

Under the pseudonym of Peter Deane, Hinkson wrote The Victors (1925) and Harvest (1927) set during and after the First World War. The identity of 'Peter Deane' was revealed by the writer Hugh Cecil following research into his 1995 book The Flower of Battle: British Fiction Writers of the First World War.

Her last publication was Golden rose in 1944.

She died on 26 May 1982 aged 81.

== Bibliography ==
1. The End of all Dreams (1923)
2. The Girls of Redlands (1923)
3. Patsey at School (1925)
4. St. Mary's (1927)
5. Schooldays at Meadowfield (1930)
6. Wind from the West (1930)
7. The Ladies' Road (1932)
8. Victory Plays the Game (1933)
9. Connor's Wood (revised and completed by Pamela Hinkson) (1933)
10. The Deeply Rooted (1935)
11. The Light of Ireland (1935)
12. Victory's Last Term (1936)
13. Seventy Years Young (Memories of Elizabeth, Countess of Fingall told to Pamela Hinkson) (1937)
14. Irish Gold (1939)
15. Indian Harvest (1941)
16. Golden Rose (1944)
