= Clement Shorter =

English author and critic (1857–1926)

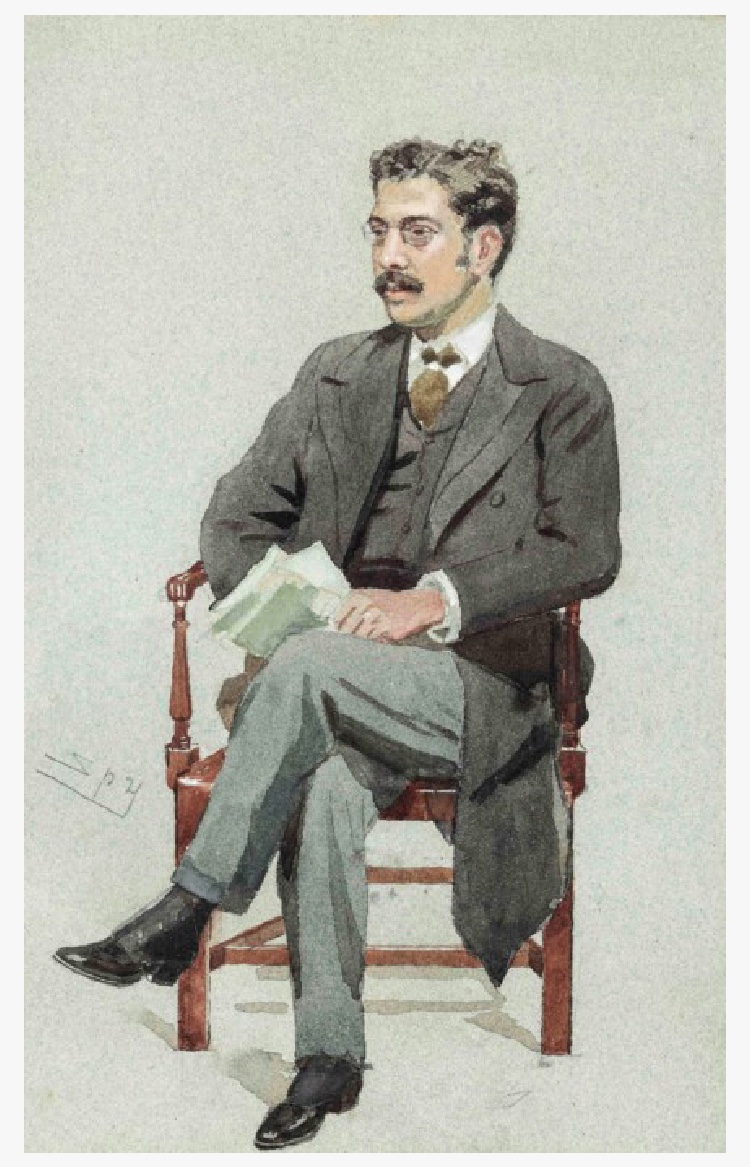
- Portrait of Shorter by Spy in Vanity Fair that appeared under the heading 'Men of the Day', 1894
- Born: Clement King Shorter; 19 July 1857; Bridge Without, London, United Kingdom of Great Britain and Ireland
- Died: 19 October 1926 (aged 69); Great Missenden, Buckinghamshire, United Kingdom
- Spouses: Dora Sigerson (m. 1896; died 1918) Annie Doris Banfield (m. 1920)
- Children: 1
- Parents: Richard Shorter (father); Elizabeth née Clemenson (mother)

Clement King Shorter (19 July 1857 – 19 November 1926) was a British journalist and literary critic. After editing the Illustrated London News, Shorter founded and edited The Sketch, The Sphere, and Tatler.

== Biography ==
Shorter was born on 19 July 1857 in Southwark, in London, the youngest of three boys. The son of Richard and Elizabeth (née Clemenson) Shorter, young Clement attended school from 1863 to 1871 in Downham Market, Norfolk. He was still quite young when his father died in Melbourne, Colony of Victoria, where he had gone in an attempt to make a better life for his young family.

Once finished with his schooling, Shorter spent four years working for several booksellers and publishers on Paternoster Row in London. In 1877, he found himself working in the Exchequer and Audit Department at Somerset House, as a low-level clerk.

Shorter married twice, first to Dora Sigerson, an Irish poet. He married her in 1896, and she died in 1918. In 1920, he remarried, to a woman from Penzance, named Annie Doris Banfield. Survived by his wife and daughter, he died on 19 November 1926, at his home at Great Missenden, Buckinghamshire.

== Career ==
=== In journalism ===
Shorter's career in journalism began in 1888, when he began working as a sub-editor for the Penny Illustrated Paper. At that time, he was also writing for The Star, a weekly column about books. By 1890, he had resigned his clerical position at Somerset House, to focus solely on his journalistic endeavours.

An important influence on the English pictorial press, in 1891 he became editor of the Illustrated London News. By 1893, he had founded and edited The Sketch. In 1900, he founded The Sphere, which he edited up until his death in 1926. During this time, Shorter maintained writing his controversial weekly column, 'A Literary Letter'. He described the content of the two papers he edited during this time (first, The Sphere, and shortly thereafter, Tatler) as "on more frivolous lines."

In addition to founding Sketch and The Sphere, he was also the founder of Tatler.

=== As an author, literary critic, and collector ===
Shorter was an avid collector, particularly of the works of the Brontë sisters. It led to some of his best-known works, including two about Charlotte Brontë, and two more about the Brontë family. Shorter also edited Elizabeth Gaskell's The Life of Charlotte Brontë in 1899.

Shorter's works of literary criticism include The Brontës and their Circle (1896), Immortal Memories (1907), The Brontës: Life and Letters (1908), and George Borrow and his Circle (1913). He also wrote books about Napoleon, two about George Borrow, and a volume of addresses and essays. His last published work was C. K. S.: an Autobiography, which was edited by John Malcolm Bulloch, and published posthumously, in 1927.
