= Dora Sigerson Shorter =

Irish poet and sculptor (1866–1918)

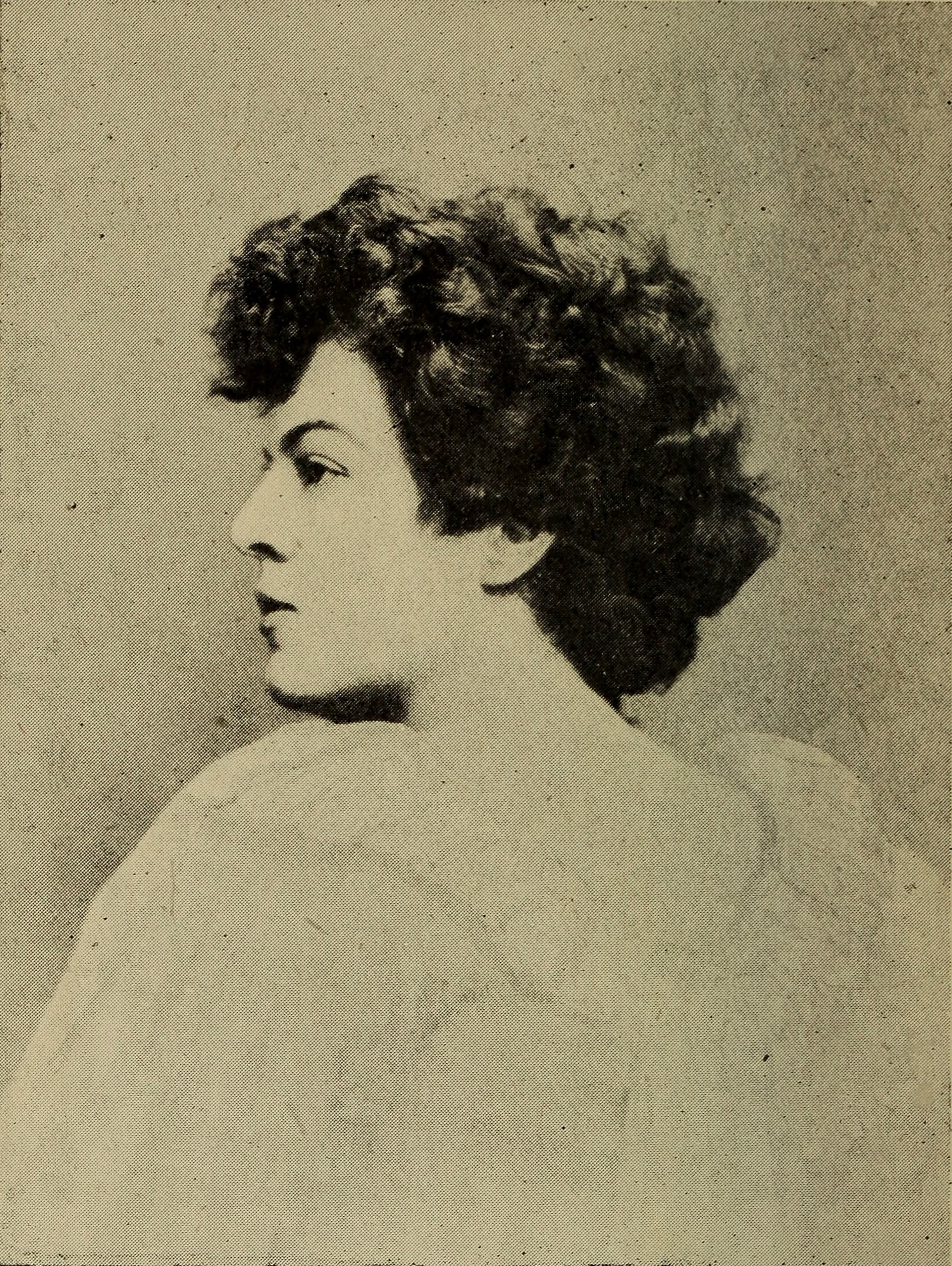
- Born: 16 August 1866; Dublin, United Kingdom of Great Britain and Ireland
- Died: 6 January 1918 (aged 51)
- Occupations: Poet; sculptor
- Spouse: Clement Shorter (m. 1895)
- Parent(s): George Sigerson; Hester Varian
- Writing career
- Pen name: Dora Sigerson Shorter

Dora Sigerson Shorter (née Dora Maria Sigerson, 16 August 1866 – 6 January 1918) was an Irish poet and sculptor.

== Life ==
Sigerson Shorter was born in Dublin, Ireland, the daughter of George Sigerson, a surgeon and writer, and Hester Varian, also a writer. She was the oldest of four children. The family home at 3 Clare Street was a gathering-place for artists and writers where Dora met important figures of the emerging Irish literary revival. She attended the Dublin School of Art, where W.B. Yeats was a fellow-pupil. She was a major figure of the Irish Literary Revival, publishing many collections of poetry from 1893. Her sister Hester Sigerson Piatt was also a writer. Her friends included Katharine Tynan, Rose Kavanagh and Alice Furlong, writers and poets.

In 1895 she married Clement King Shorter, an English journalist and literary critic. They lived together in London, until her death at age 51 from undisclosed causes. Her friend Katharine Tynan wrote in a biographical sketch that she supposedly ‘died of a broken heart’ after the 1916 executions.

== Selected publications ==
- The Fairy Changeling and Other Poems London & New York: John Lane 1897.
- The Father Confessor, Stories of Death and Danger London: Ward Lock & Co 1900.
- The Story and Song of Black Roderick London: Alexander Moring 1906.
- The Collected Poems of Dora Sigerson Shorter; with an introduction by George Meredith. London: Hodder & Stoughton, 1907.
- New Poems. Dublin & London: Maunsel, 1912 (3rd ed., 1921).
- Madge Linsey, and other poems. Dublin & London: Maunsel, 1913.
