= Elizabeth Willoughby Varian =

- Born: 1821; Ballymena, County Antrim, United Kingdom of Great Britain and Ireland
- Died: 1896 (aged 74–75)
- Occupations: Poet, nationalist
- Spouse: Ralph Varian

Elizabeth Willoughby Varian (born Elizabeth Willoughby Treacy also known as Finola; 1821 – 1896) was a poet and nationalist.

== Early life ==
Varian was born in 1821 in Ballymena, County Antrim to a unionist family. She was one of three daughters.

== Career ==
From 1850, she published a range of poetry under the pen-name Finola, frequently in The Nation, the Belfast Vindictor, and the Irishman magazine. She was part of the Young Ireland movement, and much of her poetry focused on Irish nationalism and the Irish Home Rule movement and could be described as being part of the traditional Irish nationalist ballad. She advocated for fair treatment of the marginalized as well as the need for Irish self-determination. One of her most famous poems, “The Irish Mother’s Lament” was published in Street Ballads etc in 1865. Another of her poems "Proselytizing" is notable as a contemporary account of the Great Famine of Ireland, published in 1851.

=== Books ===
She published her first book, Poems in 1851, followed by Never Forsake The Ship and Other Poems in 1871, and The Political and National Poems of Finola in 1877.

== Personal life ==
On 25 May 1871, she married Cork poet Ralph Varian.
