= Katharine Tynan =

Irish poet and novelist (1859-1931)

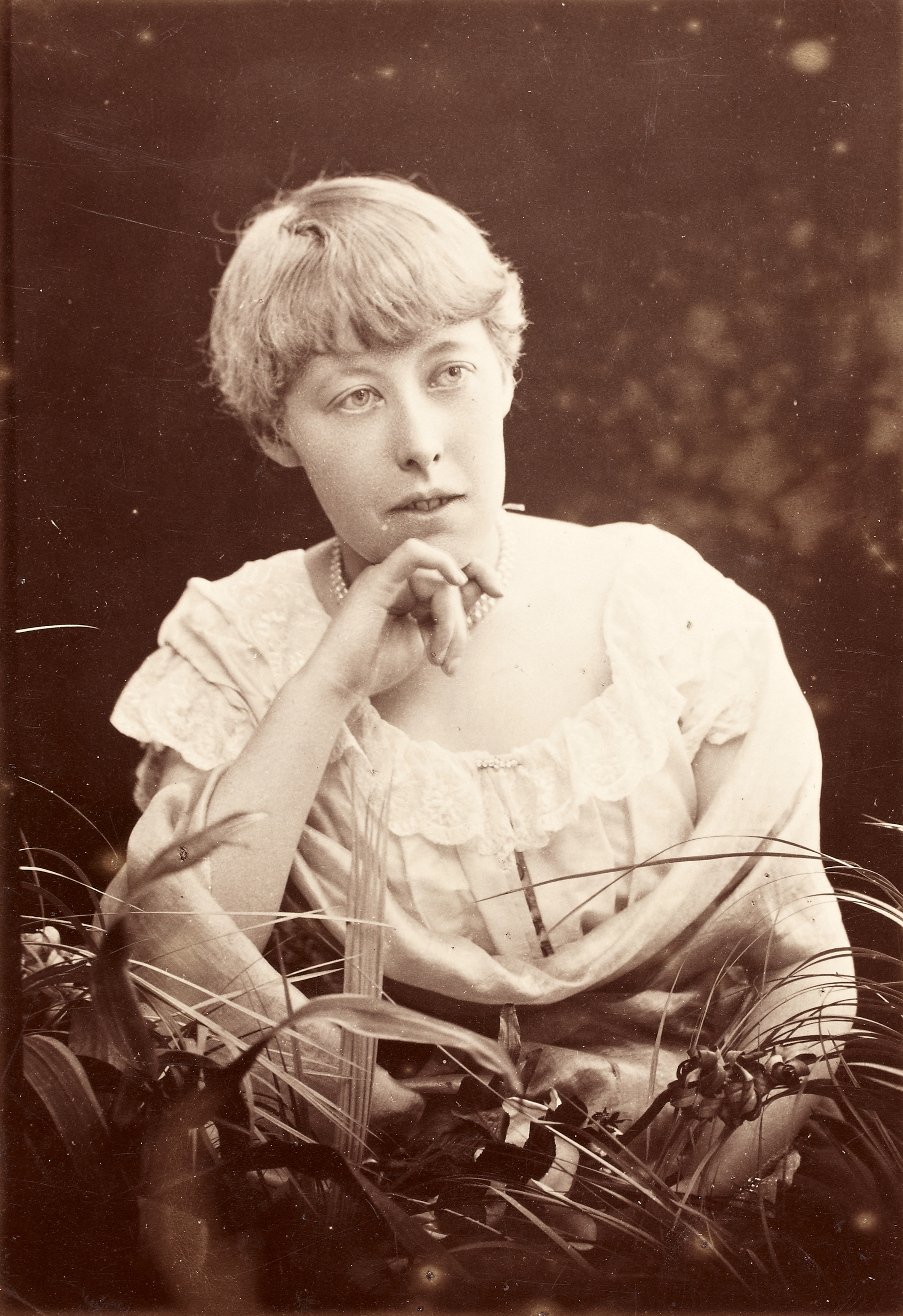
- Born: 23 January 1859; Dublin, Ireland
- Died: 2 April 1931 (aged 72); Wimbledon, London, England
- Occupations: Novelist, poet
- Writing career
- Pen name: Katharine Tynan Hinkson
- Language: English

Signature
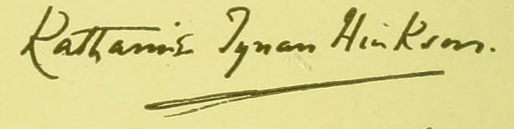

Katharine Tynan (23 January 1859 – 2 April 1931) was an Irish writer, known mainly for her novels and poetry. After her marriage in 1893 to the Trinity College scholar, writer and barrister Henry Albert Hinkson (1865–1919) she usually wrote under the name Katharine Tynan Hinkson, or variations thereof. Tynan's younger sister Nora Tynan O'Mahony (née Tynan, 1866–1954) was also a poet and one of her three children, Pamela Hinkson (1900–1982), was also known as a writer. Katharine Tynan Road (Bóthar Katharine Tynan) in Tallaght, which passes close to the ruins of her childhood home at Whitehall Farm, is named after her.

== Biography ==
Tynan was born the fifth of twelve children of Andrew Cullen Tynan, a prosperous farmer and cattle trader and later a Dublin alderman for the Irish Parliamentary Party, and Elizabeth Tynan (née Reilly). She grew up in Whitehall, Clondalkin and educated at the Dominican St Catherine's, a convent school in Drogheda.

Her poetry was first published in 1875. She met and became friendly with the poet Gerard Manley Hopkins in 1886. Tynan went on to play a major part in Dublin literary circles, until she married and moved to England; later she lived at Claremorris, County Mayo when her husband was a magistrate from 1914 until 1919.

She worked for the Ladies' Land League, run by Anna Parnell, before turning to journalism, expressing her ardent support of Charles Stewart Parnell and Ireland. Her first volume of poems, Louise de la Vallière and other poems was published in 1885 and is still in print.

From June 1885 when they first met until around the time of her marriage in 1893, Tynan was a close associate of and regular correspondent with William Butler Yeats (who may have proposed marriage and been rejected). Tynan was also later a correspondent of Francis Ledwidge. She is said to have written over 100 novels. Her Collected Poems appeared in 1930; she also wrote five autobiographical volumes.

In 1888 Tynan met Dublin-born lawyer and classical scholar Henry Hinkson, and they married in London in 1893. In England she became a prolific poet and journalist. Tynan contributed to many periodicals and magazines such as the Jesuit published Studies, the Dominican published Irish Rosary, Irish Monthly, Hibernia and Dublin University Review. She wrote on the treatment of shop girls, unmarried mothers, infanticide, capital punishment and the education of the poor. From 1895 to 1930 she wrote more than 102 novels.

In 1911 the Hinkson/Tynan family moved to Castlebar, Co Mayo with their two sons and daughter when her husband was appointed Resident Magistrate there. Her politics swung away from her native country and towards England, especially when both of her sons volunteered to fight in World War I. She returned to England in 1919 and continued to write prolifically, including the production of a five-volume autobiography, and travelled extensively in Europe. Her daughter was the novelist Pamela Hinkson, and her son Giles A. Hinckson was correspondent for The Times in Buenos Aires and Santiago.

Tynan died in Wimbledon, London aged 72, and is buried in Kensal Green Cemetery.

== Publications ==
=== Poetry ===
- Louise de la Vallière and Other Poems (1885)
- Shamrocks (1887)
- Ballads & Lyrics (1891)
- Irish Love-Songs (1892)
- Cuckoo Songs (1894)
- Poems (1901)
- Innocencies: A Book of Verse (1905)
- New Poems (1911)
- Irish Poems (1913)
- The Flower of Peace (1914)
- Flower of Youth (1915)
- The Holy War (1916)
- Late Songs (1917)
- Evensong (1922)
- Twilight Songs (1927)

=== Fiction ===
- A Cluster of Nuts, Being Sketches Among My Own People (1894)
- Miracle Plays - Our Lord’s Coming and Childhood (1895)
- The Land of Mist and Mountain (1895)
- The Way of a Maid (1895)
- Three Fair Maids, or the Burkes of Derrymore (c.1895) later Illustrated by G. Demain Hammond
- An Isle in the Water (1896)
- Any Woman (1896)
- Oh, What a Plague is Love! (1896)
- The Handsome Brandons: A Story for Girls (1899), illustrated by G. D. Hammond
- The Dear Irish Girl (1899)
- Her Father's Daughter (1900)
- A Daughter of the Fields (1900)
- The Adventures of Carlo (1900), illustrated by E. A. Cubitt
- A King's Woman (1902)
- Love of Sisters (1902)
- The Great Captain: A Story of the Days of Sir Walter Raleigh (1902)
- The Golden Lily (1902)
- A Girl of Galway (1902)
- The Handsome Quaker, and Other Stories (1902)
- A Red, Red Rose (1902)
- The Luck of the Fairfaxes (1904)
- A Daughter of Kings (1905)
- For the White Rose (1905)
- A Little Book for Mary Gill's Friends (1905)
- The Story of Bawn (1906)
- The Yellow Domino (1906)
- Book of Memory (1906)
- Dick Pentreath (1906)
- The Rhymed Life of St Patrick (1907), illustrated by Lyndsay Symington
- A Little Book of XXIV Carols (1907)
- Father Mathew (1908), biography of Theobald Mathew
- Experiences (1908)
- A Union of Hearts (1908)
- The House of the Crickets (1908)
- Ireland (1909)
- A Little Book for John O'Mahony's Friends (1909)
- The Book of Flowers (1909), with Frances Maitland
- Mary Gray (1909)
- The House of the Secret (1910)
- Betty Carew (1910)
- Freda (1910)
- The Story of Cecelia (1911)
- Princess Katharine (1911)
- Heart o’ Gold, or The Little Princess (1912)
- A Midsummer Rose (1913)
- A Mesalliance (1913)
- The Daughter of the Manor (1914), illustrated by John Campbell
- The Flower of Peace (1914)
- A Shameful Inheritance (1914)
- A Little Radiant Girl (1914), illustrated by John Campbell
- Mary Beaudesert, V. S. (1915)
- The Curse of Castle Eagle (1915)
- The House of the Foxes (1915)
- Lord Edward: A Study in Romance (1916)
- Maxims from the Writing of Katharine Tynan (1916), edited by Elsie E. Morton
- Margery Dawe (1916), illustrated by Frank E. Wiles
- The Sad Years (1918), tribute to Dora Sigerson
- Herb o’ Grace: Poems in War-Time (1918)
- The Honourable Molly (1919)
- The Man from Australia: A Passionate Pilgrim (1919)
- Denys the Dreamer (1920)
- The House (1920)
- Bitha's Wonderful Year (1922)
- A Mad Marriage (1922)
- White Ladies (1922)
- The House on the Bogs (1922)
- Pat, the Adventurer (1923)
- The House of Doom (1924)
- Life in the Occupied Area (1925)
- The Briar Bush Maid (1926)
- The Wild Adventure (1927)
- The Respectable Lady (1927)
- The Face in the Picture (1927)
- Haroun of London (1927)
- Castle Perilous (1928)
- The House in the Forest (1928)
- The Rich Man (1929)
- The River (1929)
- The Admirable Simmons (1930)
- The Squire's Sweetheart (1930)
- Denise the Daughter (1930)
- The Forbidden Way (1931)
- Philippa's Lover (1931)
- A Lonely Maid (1931)
- The Story of Our Lord (1932)
- The Other Man (1932)
- The Pitiful Lady (1932)
- An International Marriage (1933)
- The House of Dreams (1934)

=== Autobiography ===
- Twenty-Five Years: Reminiscences (1913)
- The Middle Years: A Memoir (1916)
- The Years of the Shadow (1919)
- The Wandering Years: A Memoir (1922)
- Memories (1924)

=== Anthologies ===
- The Cabinet of Irish Literature (1906), editor, expansion of work by Charles Read in four volumes
- Twenty-One Poems, selected by W. B. Yeats (Dun Emer Press, 1907)
- The Poems of Katharine Tynan (1963), edited by Monk Gibbon
- The Wild Harp (1913), poetry anthology, editor, illustrated by C. M. Watts
- Collected Poems (1930)

== Bibliography ==
- A. H. Miles (ed.): Christina G. Rossetti to Katharine Tynan (George Routledge, 1907)
- Patrick Braybrooke: Some Catholic Novelists: Their Art and Outlook (Bruce, 1931)
- Roger McHugh (ed.): W. B.Yeats, Letters to Katharine Tynan (Clonmore & Reynolds, 1953)
- Marilyn Gaddis Rose: Katharine Tynan (Bucknell University Press, 1974)
- Ann Connerton Fallon: Katharine Tynan (Twayne Publishers, 1979)
- Anne Ulry Colman, A Dictionary of Nineteenth-century Irish Women Poets (Kenny's Bookshop, 1996)
- Rolf Loeber and Magda Loeber, A Guide to Irish Fiction 1650–1900 (Four Courts Press, 2006), pp. 1315–1332
