= Alice Milligan =

Irish writer and activist

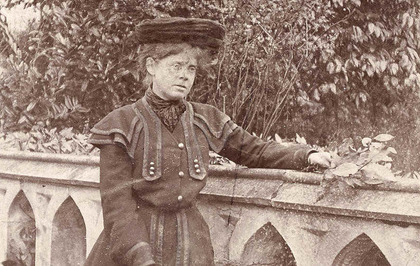
- Born: 4 September 1865; Gortmore, County Tyrone, Ireland
- Died: 13 April 1953 (aged 87); Trichur, County Tyrone, Northern Ireland
- Education: Methodist College Belfast
- Occupations: Writer, Poet, Dramatist
- Movement: Gaelic League, Irish Women's Association, Sinn Féin

Alice Letitia Milligan [pseud. Iris Olkyrn] (4 September 1865 – 13 April 1953) was an Irish writer and activist in Ireland's Celtic Revival; an advocate for the political and cultural participation of women; and a Protestant-unionist convert to the cause of Irish independence. She was at the height of her renown at the turn of the 20th century when in Belfast, with Anna Johnston, she produced the political and literary monthly The Shan Van Vocht (1896–1899), and when in Dublin the Irish Literary Theatre's performed "The Last Feast of the Fianna” (1900), Milligan's interpretation of Celtic legend as national drama.

== Early life and influences ==
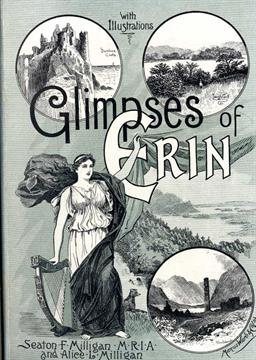

=== Family and education ===
Milligan was one of nine surviving children born to Charlotte Burns, a linen shop assistant, and Seaton Milligan, a commercial drapery salesman in a village outside Omagh, County Tyrone, in 1866. In 1879, promoted by his company to an executive position, her father moved the family to Belfast where Milligan was able to attend Methodist College, Belfast, an early pioneer of secondary mixed-sex education. Her first poems were published in the school magazine Eos.

Her father, a liberal unionist and well-known antiquarian, organized talks and lectures for the local workingmen's institute and drew his daughter into discussion of history, international affairs and literature. Alice also acknowledged the influence of a family servant, Jane, who conveyed the spirit of her previous mistress Mary Ann McCracken (1770–1866). McCracken was the devoted sister of Henry Joy McCracken, the United Irish leader executed in the wake of the 1798 Rebellion and, to the end of her days in Belfast, an advocate for women and for the poor.

As a by-product of their participation together in the Belfast Naturalists' Field Club, Milligan and her father wrote an ethnographic travelogue of Ireland, Glimpses of Erin (1888). In the book her father offered that "patriotism … far from being an irrational sentiment is entirely rational and desirable from a utilitarian point of view. It is as much so from a Christian standpoint. By living in our own land and doing our best to benefit it, we can best carry out the command 'Do unto others as you would that they should do to you'".

=== The Gaelic League ===
After a year studying in English history and literature at King's College, London, Milligan trained as a teacher and 1888 secured a position as a Latin instructor at the MacKillip's Ladies Collegiate School in Derry. It is here that she first became interested in Irish, the once majority language that as a child she had heard spoken only by farm hands. In 1891 she took a further position in Dublin. Unable, until the formation in 1893 of the Gaelic League, to find any school or group to teach Irish, she took lessons privately, while reading Irish literature and history in the National Library.

Milligan's command of Irish was never fluent, and on that basis Patrick Pearse was to object when, in 1904, the Gaelic League hired her as a travelling lecturer. With the help of costumed tableaux vivants evoking Irish historical or literary subjects (a skill she first acquired when commissioned to assist with the Irish exhibit at the 1893 Chicago World Fair), Milligan proved herself by establishing new branches throughout Ireland and raising funds along the way. In the north, in Ulster, she focused on the more difficult task of recruiting Protestants, working with, among other activists, League president Douglas Hyde, Ada McNeill, Roger Casement, Stephen Gwynn, and Seamus McManus.

== Political development ==
=== A Royal Democrat ===
In Dublin Milligan was witness both to the first stirrings of the Irish cultural renaissance and to the last act in the political career of Charles Stewart Parnell. In June 1891 she saw the beleaguered leader of Irish nationalism at a public meeting "beaten and ashamed" by the furore created by his being named in a divorce case (his affair with Kitty O'Shea). In the poem "At Maynooth" she scathingly contrasts the private life of George V, in 1911 rapturously received at the Catholic seminary by Cardinal Logue, to that of the man once hailed as Ireland's "uncrowned King".

Fascinated by Parnell and his non-denominational nationalism, Milligan followed his appearances across the city, sketching him as she went. This, she conceded, represented a sea-change in her political consciousness. Until then she described herself (despite her father's relative liberalism) as still very much a product of a "Tory and Protestant" upbringing, blinded to the literature and history of her native land by her formal education. In May 1891 she noted in her diary: "While in the tram going up O’Connell Street I turned into a Parnellite."

Writing as "Iris Olkyrn", Milligan's first novel, published the year before Parnell's death in October 1891, A Royal Democrat, had been a neo-Jacobite tale of a future Prince of Wales who, born to an Irish mother, leads "his" people in the struggle for land rights and a restored Irish Parliament. Assuming of the defeat of the existing Irish Home Rule movement, and attempting too many reconciliations, it was not well received in the nationalist press.

=== Commemorating 1798 ===
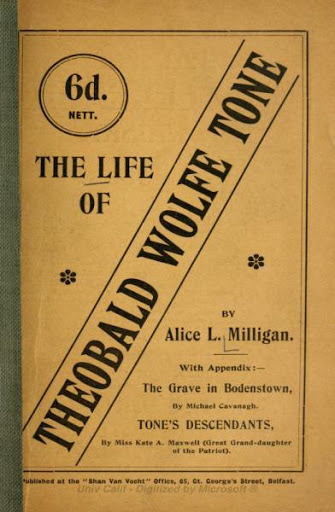

In 1893 Milligan returned to Belfast. She lived with Anna Johnston (later to write under the name, Ethna Carbery), the daughter of Robert Johnston, a leading member of the Irish Republican Brotherhood. Together with their next-door neighbour, the English-born suffragist Mary Ann Bulmer, they founded the Irish Women's Association (IWA) in Belfast both to spread "national ideas among the women" and to sustain the city's national and literary "prestige". Branches were also established in Moneyreagh (where the Presbyterian minister, Richard Lyttle, convened the Gaelic League), and in Portadown. In 1895 Milligan started writing a regular column for the Irish Weekly Independent entitled "Notes from the North" to remind a Dublin readership of these and other contributions of women, and of the North, to the national cause.

Together with Johnston and Bulmer (and her son Bulmer Hobson, later also of the IRB), Milligan was drawn into the orbit of Francis Joseph Bigger. Bigger was a wealthy Presbyterian solicitor; like her father an avid antiquarian (he co-edited the journal of the Irish Folklore Society with Milligan's sister Charlotte); and a celebrated host. To his house, Ard Righ, on the northern shore of Belfast Lough, Bigger attracted the poets and writers of the "Northern Revival" (among them Seumus McManus, Helen Waddell, Herbert Hughes, and Margaret Pender) as well other prominent culturati. It was at Ard Righ that Milligan first met, among the regular visitors, James Connolly, Roger Casement and W. B. Yeats. Walking with her on Cave Hill above Ard Righ ("holy" to Milligan as the site where Wolfe Tone and McCracken pledged themselves to Irish independence), Yeats disappointed Milligan. He failed “to warm to the least mention of '98".

Milligan's passion for the United Irishmen was shared by Bigger (he had a room in Ard Arigh dedicated to the rebellion). Together, Neal O'Boyle and Ethna Carbery, they sought to organise a Belfast commemoration of the 1798 centenary. Milligan produced a six-penny Life of Theobald Wolfe Tone (Belfast, 1898). However, the descendants of the "Protestant leaders and peasants" who, according to Milligan, had sealed Tone's union of creeds on "the battle field and scaffold", effectively restricted any commemorative display to Catholic districts. A processive outing (organised with help of Lyttle) to the grave of Betsy Gray, heroine of the Battle of Ballynahinch, ended in a fracas and the destruction by unionists of her memorial stone. Milligan's emphasis upon Belfast's republican past "served to highlight just how different the city was at the end of the nineteenth century".

Meanwhile, attitudes on the nationalist side persuaded Milligan to launch (through the IWA) a separate Women's Centenary Union. As a woman she found that she was being barred from Centenary meetings, and that these were being appropriated by local politicians to solicit Catholic votes. On April 6, 1897, she beseeched readers of The Shan Van Vocht: "Is it too much to ask [...] that the women of Ireland, who are not asked to have any opinion whatever as to who shall have the right to speak for Ireland in the British Parliament, should form the Union which an historic occasion demands".

== The Shan Van Vocht ==
=== The two-penny journal ===
Alice Milligan & Anna Johnston

The Shan Van Vocht (The "Poor Old Woman" in Irish, the metaphor for Ireland in a rebellion-era ballad) was produced by Milligan and Johnston in the offices of Robert Johnston's timber yard (and often edited at Ard Righ). They had been editing the paper of another commemorative circle, the Henry Joy McCracken Literary Society, the Northern Patriot, but in December 1895 they were dismissed possibly because in three of their four issues they had supported amnesty for Fenian prisoners.

In a short period, the two-penny monthly achieved a wide circulation. As touring lecturers for the Irish Women's Association, Milligan and Johnston promoted the magazine and the formation of reading circles. Agents were found in Dublin, Derry, Glasgow and New York. Within a year subscriptions were also coming in from the Irish diaspora in South Africa, Canada, Argentina and Australia. Maud Gonne, who described Milligan as "small, aggressive and full of observant curiosity", said that she and her friends were "full of almost envious admiration of some numbers of the Shan Van Vocht, a daring little paper".

The formula was similar to that which had launched the Gavan Duffy's Young Ireland paper in the 1840s. Like The Nation, The Shan Van Vocht offered a mixture of poetry, serialised fiction, Irish history, political analysis and announcements.

The second issue (Belfast, February 1896) contained the following:

"America ... Oh mighty foster land" (poem); "The Captain’s Daughter" (a serial written by Milligan under the name Iris Olkyrn); "The Lonely One" (poem); "The Rise and Fall of the Fenian Movement of ‘67" (serialised history); "Manus O’Mallaghan and the Fairies" (folklore); "Irish Football Victory"; "On Inisheer’" (poem); "Willie Kane of the “Northern Star”, How He Escaped the Scaffold" (United Irishman); "Irishmen in the Transvaal" (volunteers with the Boers against the British); "The Burial-Place of the Sheares" (United Irishmen); "Our National Language"; "James Clarence Mangan"; "Reviews – The life of Owen Roe O'Neill (the rebel Ulster chieftain), The Life and Writings of Fintan Lalor" (prophet of the Land War); "Our Notebook’" (diary and announcements); "The Moonlighters Hound" (poem); "For the Old Land" (review of different agencies advancing the national cause).

=== Unity above creed and class ===
The very first issue, January 1896, had given a platform to James Connolly: "Socialism and Nationalism", his argument that without a creed capable of challenging the rule of the capitalist, landlord and financier, the nationalism of "Irish Language movements, Literary Societies or Commemoration Committees" would achieve little. Connolly was allowed further submissions, and Milligan published appreciative letters from readers. Yet while expressing "full sympathy with Mr Connolly's views on the labour and social questions", Milligan opposed the formation of his Irish Socialist Republican Party and refused their invitation to lecture.

Milligan's editorials "sidestepped" Connolly's proposal to link socialism and nationalism. Instead she took issue with the suggestion that the new party would seek election to Westminster. If successful, she believed that the ISRP would be led into "an alliance with the English labour" no less debilitating than the courtship of English Liberals had proved for the Irish Parliamentary Party. "Freedom's boon" had to be won at home.

Milligan's ideal remained United Irishmen's appeal to nation above both creed and class. It suffused the journal's literary features and, not least, her own particular genre of "across-the-divide" romances. Her serialised "The Little Green Slippers" "melds patriotic and erotic desire". A young society woman in Protestant Belfast, forced in wake of the McCracken's execution to attend a British Red-Coat ball, secures the devotion of own her beloved rebel, a country Catholic on the run, by scandalously wearing green slippers and black (mourning) crepe.

The Donegal writer Seumas MacManus wrote that The Shan Van Vocht "revived Irish nationalism when it was perishing." Leading literary revivalist Padraic Colum credited "a freshness that came from its femininity" (Milligan and Johnston were joined as the leading contributors by Alice Furlong, Katherine Tynan, Margaret Pender and Nora Hopper) and a nationalism that was northern and never "parliamentarian".

Despite the acclaim, the journal's attempt to unify nationalists across region, class, sex and religion proved untenable: no faction or party was prepared to provide enough financial support to sustain it. In April 1899, Mark Ryan of the IRB persuaded Milligan and Johnston that after forty issues it was time to pass the project on. Shan Van Vocht's subscription list was passed to Arthur Griffith and his new weekly, the United Irishman, organ of Cumann na nGaedheal the forerunner of Sinn Féin.

== Irish Republican ==
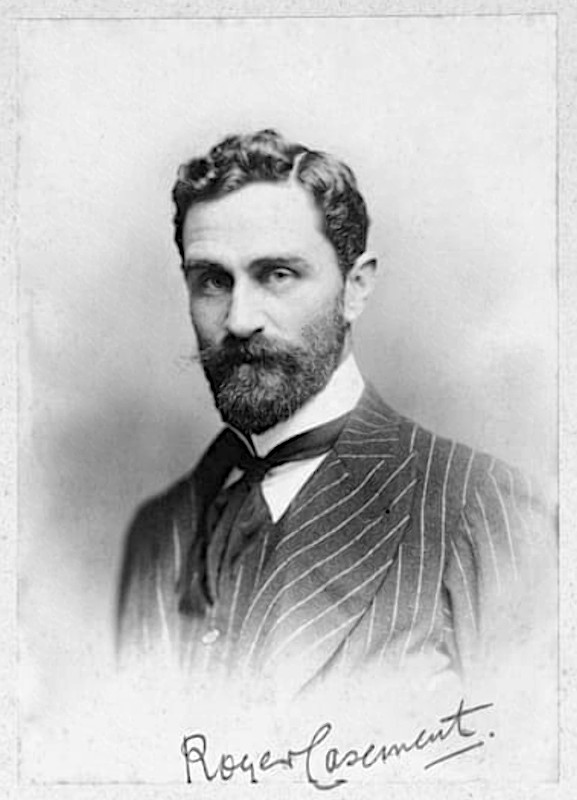

Milligan's "romantic visions were of marching soldiers and green flags flying". What others regarded as revolutionary violence, the Fenian dynamite campaign of the 1880s, she rejected. In the October 1896 issue of Shan Van Vocht, she had condemned the use of dynamite methods:

Those who would stoop to suggest, or organise, or carry out anything of the sort, degrade the name of their country, and in the eyes of the whole world render her less worthy of Nationhood. [...] Stern and terrible deeds are often done and may justly be done in such a strife as ours; but this method of bomb throwing and blowing up buildings, without aim or reason other than the mere desire for vengeance is imbecile and wrong.

This was not the light in which she saw the 1916 Easter Rising. Following close upon the death of her parents and her sister Charlotte (whom she had been nursing in London), the insurrection in Dublin, and the executions and loss of Connolly, Tomas MacDonagh and others she had known, affected her deeply. In London she visited Casement in detention. They had been together in Larne in April 1914 after unionists had run German guns through the port, a feat Casement told her nationalists would have to match. On August 3, 1916, she was holding vigil outside Pentonville Prison and heard the applause that signalled his execution. Back in Dublin, she contributed plays and poems to a fund-raising campaign for Irish political prisoners.

Milligan supported Sinn Féin in the 1918 general election, campaigning for the trade unionist and East Rising veteran Winifred Carney in Belfast. While aghast at the civil war that followed, she also sided with Éamon de Valera in rejecting the 1921 Anglo-Irish Treaty, refusing dominion status and Partition in lieu of the republic.

== Dramatist ==
=== Cultural activism ===
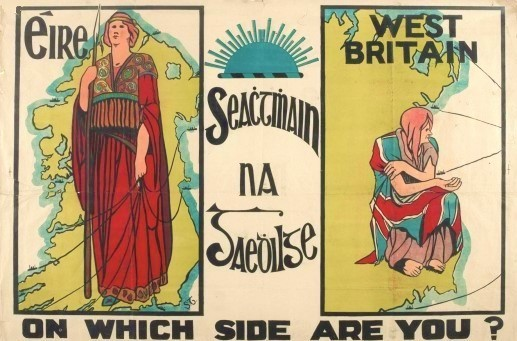
Gaelic League poster

While her parents were tolerant of her views, Milligan's childhood community excluded her. At the same time she found that in nationalist circles her Protestant background could count against her. What won over many over was her undeniable role in the cultural revival. Milligan's contemporary and fellow poet, Susan Langstaff Mitchell, wrote of her in 1919:

In almost every one of the national and intellectual activities in Ireland now known to everyone – the Gaelic Revival, the dramatic movement, the literary renaissance – this indefatigable Irish girl was there at the start of them. She was lecturing for the Gaelic League all over Ireland, she was writing plays and staging them [...] and she was [repeating the judgement of editor and critic, George Russell]. the most successful producer of plays before the Abbey Theatre started on its triumphant way.

Comparing her to the Young Irelander Thomas Davis, in the Irish Review in September 1914 Tomas MacDonagh described Milligan as "the most Irish of living poets and therefore the best". W.B. Yeats was less convinced. Not least because of the comparison with Davis's heavy-laden patriotic verse, he advised her to stick to drama.

=== “The Last Feast of the Fianna” ===
From 1898, in short succession Milligan wrote eleven plays staged by Maud Gonne's Inghinidhe na hÉireann (Daughters of Ireland), the Gaelic League and Irish Literary Theatre. In February 1901, the ILT performed “The Last Feast of the Fianna” in Dublin's Gaiety Theatre. Depicting an episode in the Oisin legend, it was a Greek stage invocation of the twilight of pre-Christian Ireland.

The play's lack of action and use of music (provided by her sister Charlotte) created moments of "picturesque stillness" on stage suggestive of the tableaux vivant which Milligan mounted on tour for the Gaelic League. At one such moment, John O'Leary, provided "an extraordinary uniting of past and present, legendary and historical.". The Freeman's Journal reported that the Fenian chief, veteran of the 1867 Rising, "favoured the authoress by appearing [on stage] amongst the band of warriors [Fianna] feasting at the banquet board".

The reviewer of the Dublin edition of the Daily Express concluded that "if the aim of the Irish Literary Theatre is to create a national drama", it was "obvious" that Miss Milligan's method was "the proper road" to follow. Yeats, who was working with George Moore on a comparable project (Diarmuid and Grania), did allow that the play "touched the heart as some greater drama on some foreign theme would not". But Augusta Gregory, with whom Yeats had established the ILT, was entirely dismissive. She found the language of the long soliloquies "intolerable" and the overall effect "tawdry".

=== National credo ===
In 1905 the Cork National Players performed Milligan's “The Daughter of Donagh”. The melodrama (which the ILT's successor, the Abbey Theatre had rejected) is based on her unpublished 1893 novel, "The Cromwellians". Characteristically for Milligan it combines the theme of Irish dispossession with a transgressive relationship: between a Cromwellian soldier and the daughter of the Irish family on which he has been quartered.

Milligan was unapologetic about the continuous nationalist thread in her writing. In 1893 she had written that Irish art could not exist "in some quiet paradise apart" but only "within the noisy field of political warfare". Invoking the memory of Young Ireland, Milligan criticised those in the Literary Revival who "proceeded on purely literary lines" and "lacked the national spirit that had fired the country in [18]48".

== Later years ==
On the eve of the Great War Milligan was living in Dublin with her younger brother William and his family. They collaborated on two works of fiction, an Irish-Norse saga Sons of the Sea King. and The Dynamite Drummer (an American tourist comments on the grim determination of Ulster Protestants in opposing Home Rule "not to rule themselves"). With the outbreak of war, William volunteered and when discharged by the British Army suffered from what might today be recognised as Post-traumatic stress disorder (PTSD). Late in 1921 he received notice that, as a former British officer, he had 24 hours to quit Dublin or be shot. Who sanctioned the republican order was not established. Leaving her business, an Irish bookshop in Dawson Street, and all her possessions, Milligan fled with her brother first to Belfast and then to England.

Milligan and her brother returned to Tyrone in what was now Unionist-controlled Northern Ireland in the 1931. She lived with William, who had secured a minor civil-service position, his wife and paralysed son in the village of Drumragh outside Omagh. Her nephew, of whom she was very fond, died in 1934 aged only 26. William died three years later.

Hindered by the regular interception of mail, and obliged to report daily to a police barracks, Milligan described herself to Áine Ceannt as an "interned prisoner". She spoke of the "hostile" "un-Irish" atmosphere of the North at Wexford's commemoration of the United Irishmen in July 1938. That year she was the only woman signatory of a pamphlet issued by the Northern Council for Unity protesting Partition.

During the Second World War, after the death of her sister-in-law, Milligan went to live on a farm in County Antrim with her lifelong friend, Eleanor Boyd. Relieved of the burden of caring for sick family members she again wrote poems for the Nationalist press, including The Irish Press edited by her friend, M.J. MacManus. In 1941, the National University of Ireland granted her an honorary doctorate.

Alice Milligan died in Trichur, County Tyrone, on 13 April 1953, aged 87. She had ended her life in poverty. Her Unionist relatives, she explained to Bigger, were disinclined to give her a helping hand "as they find that my political activities are constrained by financial embarrassment". Visiting her in the late 1940s, the Irish writer and broadcaster Benedict Kiely was saddened "to think that to be poor, lonely and smoke-dried should be the lot of a poet at the end of it all".

In 1914, acknowledging Milligan as "a northern Protestant woman who had denounced the unionist Anglo-centric doctrine of her upbringing", Tomas MacDonagh described hers as "a cultural practice that gave voice to those (like herself) who were so often confined to the footnotes of colonial history".

== Commemoration ==
During 2010/2011 Ulster History Circle mounted plaques for famous Ulster figures. Charlotte Milligan Fox and Alice Milligan have a plaque mounted on Omagh Library, 1 Spillar's Place, Omagh, Co Tyrone.

== Select works ==
First issue, January 1896

=== Plays (in order of journal publication) ===
- “The Last Feast of the Fianna”, Daily Express, Dublin (1899)
- "The Daughters of Donagh", United Irishmen (weekly, December 1903)
- “Brian of Banba”, in United Irishman (1904)
- “Oisin in Tir-nan-Og”, Daily Express, Dublin (1899); also as “Oisín in Tír nan Og", in a translation by Tadhg Ua Donnchadha, Sinn Féin (23 Jan. 1909)
- “Oisin and Padraic: One-Act Play”, Sinn Féin (20 Feb. 1909)

=== Plays (book publication) ===
- The Last Feast of the Fianna: A Dramatic Legend (London: David Nutt 1900), (Chicago: De Paul Univ. 1967), [first printed Daily Express, Dublin 1899]
- The Daughter of Donagh: A Cromwellian Drama in Four Acts (1905) (Dublin: Martin Lester 1920)

=== Poetry ===
- Hero Lays (Dublin: Maunsel, 1908)
- Two Poems (Dublin: Three Candles, 1943)
- with Ethna Carbery & Seumus MacManus, We Sang for Ireland (Dublin: Gill, 1950).
- Poems by Alice Milligan, ed. with biographical introduction by Henry Mangan (Dublin: Gill, 1954).
- The Harper of the Only God: A Selection of Poetry by Alice Milligan, Sheila Turner Johnston, ed. (Omagh: Colourpoint, 1993).

=== Novels ===
- A Royal Democrat (London: Simpkin, Marshall/Dublin: Gill, 1892).
- "The Cromwellians", (United Irishman, 5–26 Dec. 1903, weekly serialisation)
- with William Milligan, The Dynamite Drummer (Dublin: Lester, [1900] 1918)
- with William Milligan, Sons of the Sea King Dublin (Dublin: M. H. Gill & Son, 1914).

=== Non-fiction ===
- with Seaton F. Milligan, Glimpses of Erin: An Account of the Ancient Civilisation, Manners, Customs, and Antiquities of Ireland (London: Marcus Ward, 1890).
- The Life of Theobald Wolfe Tone (Belfast: J. W. Boyd, 1898).
- "Tribute to AE" [George Russell], Dublin Magazine (October 1935)
- Harper of the Only God, selected writing, Sheila Turner Johnston ed. (Newtownards: Colourpoint, 1993).

=== Journals edited with Anna Johnston ===
- The Northern Patriot (Belfast: October 1895 – December 1895)
- The Shan Van Vocht (Belfast: January 1896 – April 1899)

== See also ==
- List of Irish writers

== Sources ==
- Johnston, Sheila (1994). Alice: A Life of Alice Milligan. Colourpoint Books. ISBN 978-1-898392-01-9.
- Morris, Catherine (2012). Alice Milligan and the Irish Cultural Revival. Dublin: Four Courts Press. ISBN 978-1-84682-313-8.
- Harp, Richard (Spring 2000). "No Other Place But Ireland: Alice Milligan's Diaries and Letters". New Hibernia Review. 4 (1): 79–87.
