= Joseph Bigger =

Joseph Bigger may refer to:

- Joseph Biggar (c. 1828–1890), Irish nationalist MP
- Francis Joseph Bigger (1863–1926), Irish antiquarian, revivalist, solicitor, architect, author, editor
- Joseph Warwick Bigger (1891–1951), Irish senator and academic
