= Charlotte Milligan Fox =

Irish composer and author

- by Allison photographers (cropped)
- Born: Charlotte Olivia Milligan; 17 March 1864; Omagh, County Tyrone
- Died: 25 March 1916 (aged 52); London
- Occupation(s): composer, music collector

Charlotte Olivia Milligan Fox (17 March 1864 – 25 March 1916) was an Irish composer, folk music collector and writer.

== Life ==
Charlotte Milligan was born in Omagh, County Tyrone, on 17 March 1864 to Methodist parents, Seaton F. Milligan (1837–1916) and Charlotte Burns (1842–1916). She was the eldest of eleven children, with nine surviving including the poets Alice Milligan and Edith Wheeler. All nine children enrolled at the Methodist College, Belfast. She studied piano and composition at the Royal College of Music in London and the conservatories of Frankfurt and Milan.

In 1892, after her marriage to Charles Eliot Fox, she settled in London. She founded the Irish Folk Song Society in London in 1904, acting as the society's honorary secretary. As a musician she toured Ireland collecting Irish traditional songs and airs. Fox undertook a series of tours of County Antrim during 1909–1910 with her sisters Edith Wheeler and Alice Milligan. The sisters recorded and transcribed songs by Irish singers, then publishing articles and musical scores in The Journal of the Irish Folk Song Society.

In 1910, Fox visited the east coast of America where the New York branch of the Irish Folk Song Society was formed. The play The Bardic Recital was produced on 16 March at the National Theatre, Washington, fow which Fox collected and arranged the music.

Fox re-discovered Edward Bunting's papers, and under the provision of her will they came to Queen's University Belfast after her death in 1916. On the basis of these papers she wrote the book The Annals of the Irish Harpers (London, 1911). The publication stimulated a revival of interest in both the Irish harp and Edward Bunting. Alice Milligan nursed her sister prior to Fox's death in London on 25 March 1916.

An obituary of Charlotte Milligan Fox is in The Irish Booklover (1916). The Journal of the Irish Folk Song Society (1917) has a poem in remembrance of Charlotte Milligan Fox. The same issue has a memoir of Fox by Alice Milligan and an appreciation by Alfred Perceval Graves.

== Composer ==
Fox was a prolific composer of songs, with some which being based on Irish traditional songs. Both her sisters provided words for some of them. She also composed an orchestral score for The Last Feast of the Fianna by Alice Milligan.

== Irish Folk Song Society ==
In 1904, Fox co-founded with Alfred Perceval Graves the Irish Folk Song Society of London, an offshoot of the Folk Song Society formed in 1898. Its aim was to collect and publish Irish airs and ballads, in addition to holding lectures and concerts on the subject. In 1904, the President of the Society was the Earl of Shaftesbury and the Vice-Presidents included Patrick Weston Joyce, Francis Joseph Bigger, W. H. Grattan Flood, Alfred Perceval Graves, Rev. Richard Henebry and Lady Waterford. Committee members included Herbert Hughes and Edith Wheeler. The officers for 1905 had a publication committee comprising Claude Aveling, Charlotte Milligan Fox, Herbert Hughes, Rev. Michael Moloney and John Todhunter as chairman. And it established a journal the Journal of the Irish folk Song Society. The rules of the society are collected in volume 4 of the journal.

== Legacy ==
During 2010/2011, the Ulster History Circle mounted plaques for famous Ulster figures. Charlotte Milligan Fox and Alice Milligan have a plaque mounted on Omagh Library, 1 Spillar's Place, Omagh, County Tyrone.

== Published writings ==
=== Book ===
- Annals of the Irish Harpers (London: Smith, Elder & Co., 1911)

=== Articles in the Journal of the Irish Folk Song Society ===
Charlotte Milligan Fox jointly edited, with Herbert Hughes, the early issues of the Journal of the Irish Folk Song Society. Fox wrote several articles for each issue before she died:

- In vol. 1 no. 1, Fox contributed three airs: "A Kerry Caoine", "Lament of a Druid", and "Lament, on leaving Glendowan". Fox notes that "A Kerry Caoine" was sung to her by P. J. O'Shea of the Gaelic League. "Lament of a Druid" was piped to Fox by one Piper Kelly. "Lament, on leaving Glendowan" was sung to her in Gaelic by James Martin of Tannawilly in Donegal.
- In vol. 1 no. 2–3, she contributed examples of Irish versions of ballads including "The Dark-Eyed Gipsy O!", "The Old Man in the Wood", "Barbara Allen", "The Squire of Edinboro Town", "The Baliff's Daughter", and "Lord Robinson's Only Child". Fox also contributed to the double issue a "Portrait of Ann Carter with a note", a version of the ballad "Flower of Magherally O", and the ballad "Johnny Doyle".
- In vol. 2, Fox contributed the ballad "Moorlough Mary" and the air "Catherine Ogie". Fox received in the post a manuscript copy of "Moorlough Mary" from Francis Duggan of Altgoland, near Castlederg. This was in response to an inquiry Fox had placed in the Tyrone Constitution in 1904.
- In vol. 3, Fox contributed a version of the ballad "Sailor's Farewell", a sheaf of Irish dance tunes and a version of the "Baliff's Daughter of Isling-town", which was collected in Ulster.
- In vol. 4, Fox contributed ballads collected by her and Edith Wheeler: "The Deserter", "The Jolly Weaver", "The Inconstant Lover", and "Uncle Rat".
- In vol. 5, Fox contributed airs and ballads collected by her and Edith Wheeler: "Lamentation on the Death of a Fox", "Johnnie Taylor", "Peep of the Day", "The Maids of the Mourne Shore", "Easter Snow", and two versions of "The Blackbird". Included at the back of the journal is a review of Four Irish Songs, collected and arranged by her.
- In vol. 6, Fox contributed airs and ballads selected from the Bunting manuscripts by her and Alice Milligan. These had both Irish and English words. Fox also contributed an obituary of the tenor Denis O'Sullivan, a member of the Irish Folk Song Committee. A notice for the annual concert of the society is included at the back of the journal. Lady Maud Warrender sang "Ochannee", which was collected and arranged by Fox. Carmen Hill sang "The Heathery Hill", arranged and collected by Fox with words by Ethna Carbery. The Earl of Shaftesbury sang "Niamh" and "The Green Woods of Truagh" arranged by Fox.
- In vol. 7, Fox contributed more airs and ballads from the Bunting manuscripts. These had both Irish and English words. Fox also contributed various reviews: of Old Irish Folk Music and Songs by Patrick Weston Joyce, and O'Neill's Irish Music by Francis O'Neill. At the start of the volume is a reference list of available publications including vocal arrangements by Fox of the "Connacht Caoine."
- In vol. 8, Fox contributed the articles "Twelve Ulster Folk Songs from the Neighbourhood of Coleraine", "Folk Song in County Tyrone", and "Airs Taken Down in Co. Tyrone", which included an account of Aine Ni Threasaigh and her brother Éamonn. Vol. 8 also contains a review of Fox's Songs of the Irish Harpers. In addition, this volume contains an announcement and programme of a "bardic" concert in Londonderry House on Park Lane on Friday, 24 June 1910. At this event, Cecilia Kemp sang the harper's song "The Gates of Dreamland" arranged by Fox, Harry Alexander sang the harpers' songs "A Thousand Lays in a Thousand Days", "Men of Connaught", "The Red Haired Girl", "Pasteen Fionn", "The Thresher", "The Foggy Dew", and "Farewell, my Gentle Harp", all arranged by Fox. Fielding Roselle also sang "Lord Mayo", "Parting of Friends", and "Oh! Southern Breeze" arranged by Fox.
- In vol. 9, Fox contributed an article on "Irish Songs in America".
- In vol. 10, Fox contributed the two articles "Concerning the William Elliott Hudson Collection of Irish Folk Songs" and "Eleven Irish Folk Songs From the Hudson Collection". Also contained in this volume is the text of a lecture "The Last of the Irish Minstrels" delivered by Fox at the Dublin Arts Club, 4 August 1911. In addition, there is a review of Annals of the Irish Harpers.
- In vol. 11, Fox contributed the article "Airs from the Hudson Manuscripts in the Boston Library, USA" as taken down by her. In addition, there is the programme for an Irish folk song concert. At this event, Edith White and Fox played variations and fugue upon an Irish theme as collected by Fox and Lucie Johnstone sang "The Antrim Glen Song" and "Ochanee" both collected by Fox. Owen Colyer sang "The Foggy Dew" and "An Pasthew Fionn" by Fox.
- In vol. 12, Fox contributed articles on "Folk Song Collecting in Co. Waterford" and "Waterford Airs and Songs". Fox also reviewed A Cycle of Old Irish Melodies by Arthur Whiting and Part II: Gems of Melody by Carl Hardebeck. Fox also wrote an obituary notice for Lord Crofton and an account of Robert Bheldon.
- In vol. 13 Fox contributed articles on "Ancient Musical Manuscripts at University Library, Cambridge" and "More Waterford Airs" as well as contributing a review of "The Philadelphia Feis" and providing a notice for the Irish Folk Song Society's annual concert. Isobel Purdon was to play a violin suite of Waterford airs arranged and collected by Fox.
- In vol. 14, Fox provided a notice of an Irish Folk Song concert. A Mrs Rossiter sang "Lilt" and "Bonnie Lassie Oh", two Waterford airs by Isobel Purdon and Fox. She also contributed a list of Patrick Gregory's Ulster folk songs sent by him to the society and wrote an obituary for Mary Reavy, wife of Carl Hardebeck.
- In vol. 15, Fox contributed the article "Concerning Miss Colthurst's Collection of Folk Songs", which Fox had taken down on a phonograph. Fox also contribute articles on "Irish Marches", "Irish War Songs of Alfred Perceval Graves" as well as a review of the Feis Ceoil Collection of Irish Airs edited by Arthur Darley and P. J. McCall, a review of Folk Songs by Mrs Herbert Lewis and a review of Mélodies et chansons françaises by Lucien de Flagny.

== Selected compositions ==
=== Songs for voice and piano ===
- After Aughrim (G. Geoghegan) (London: Houghton & Co., 1898)
- Bridget Brady (W. Boyle) (London: Chappell & Co., 1898)
- My Prayer for You (E. Carbery) (London: J. B. Cramer & Co., 1898)
- The Flower of the Flock (Francis A. Fahy) (London: Boosey & Co., 1899)
- Erin's Lament (E. A. Gowing) (London: Weekes & Co., 1900)
- Kelly's Cat (A. P. Graves) (Cincinnati, etc.: John Church Co., 1901)
- That Lass of Donegal (A. C. Bunten) (London: J. B. Cramer & Co., 1901)
- The Cavan Recruit. A Jacobite Ballad (A. P. Graves) (London: Boosey & Co., 1901)
- The Ramblin' Irishman (E. Wheeler) (Cincinnati, etc.: J. Church Co., 1901)
- By the Short Cut to the Rosses (Nora Hopper) (London: Boosey & Co., 1902)
- Fairy Cobblers. Old Ulster Air (E. Wheeler) (London: Boosey & Co., 1902)
- The Lonely Road (F. Largesse) (London: Boosey & Co., c.1902)
- Ochanee. Ulster Folk Song (E. Wheeler) (London: Boosey & Co., 1903)
- The Courtship (E. Wheeler) (London: Boosey & Co., 1903)
- Spring's Ecstasy (C. M. Fox) (London: Boosey & Co., 1904)
- Down there in the Meadow. Ulster Lilt (E. Wheeler) (London: J. Williams, 1905)
- Pulse of my Heart. Old Gaelic Song (A. Milligan) (London: J. Williams, 1905)
- Three Irish Airs (W. Boyle, A. P. Graves) (Boston: Oliver Ditson Co., 1905): "Down in the Broom"; "Katie Kerrigan"; "With my Rureem Ra".
- Four Irish Songs (Edith Wheeler, Alice Milligan) (Dublin & London: Maunsel & Co., 1907)
- Songs from "The Four Winds of Eirinn" (E. Carbery) (Dublin: M. H. Gill & Son, 1907)
- Songs of the Irish Harpers (London & Glasgow: Bayley & Ferguson, 1910)
- Four Irish Songs. From "Songs of the Irish Harpers" (New York: G. Schirmer, 1910): "My Thousand Times Beloved" (A. Milligan); "The Red-Haired Girl" (Alice C. Bunten); "The Foggy Dew" (E. Milligan); "Dear Dark Heart" (Samuel Ferguson).
- Mary Bannan. Ballad of 98 (A. Milligan) (London: Vincent Music Co., 1912)
- Three Irish Folk-Songs (A. Milligan) (New York & London: G. Schirmer, 1913): "Dusk of Autumn"; "Green Banks of the Suir"; "The Curse of Cromwell".
- Two Old Irish War-time Ballads (A. P. Graves) (New York & London: G. Schirmer, 1915): "Mistress Magrath"; "Johnny, I hardly knew ye".

=== Chamber music ===
- Three Waterford Airs, for violin and piano (New York &, London: G. Schirmer, 1915): "Lilt: Brian the Brave"; "The Heathy Hill: Three Little Drummers"; "Bonnie Lassie, O: Beresford's Fancy".
