= Embassy Theatre (London) =

Theatre in Camden, London, England

- Eton Avenue Hall, Hampstead Conservatoire
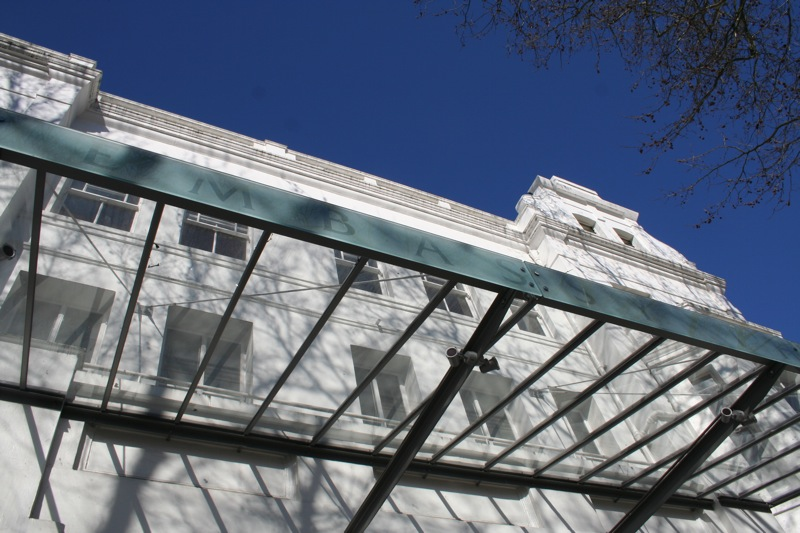
- Interactive map of Embassy Theatre
- Address: 64 Eton Avenue; London; United Kingdom
- Coordinates: 51.5442°N 0.1738°W
- Owner: Royal Central School of Speech and Drama
- Capacity: 234
- Public transit: Swiss Cottage (Jubilee line)

Construction
- Opened: 1890
- Rebuilt: 1928, 1945, 2003
- Architect: Andrew Mather

The Embassy Theatre is a theatre at 64 Eton Avenue, Swiss Cottage, in the London Borough of Camden, England.

== Early years ==
The Embassy Theatre was opened as a repertory company in September 1928 on the initiative of Sybil Arundale and Herbert Jay, when the premises of Hampstead Conservatoire of Music were adapted by architect Andrew Mather. The following were some of its productions:

- The Yellow Streak, September 1928. This was the opening production, featuring Jeanne de Casalis, Martita Hunt and Cecil Parker. The play was praised by the writer Dorothy Richardson.
- The Seventh Guest, October 1928, a mystery melodrama with Cecil Parker and Margaret Rawlings

From September 1930 to March 1932, the theatre was directed by Alec L. Rea and A. R. Whatmore. Productions included:

- Black Coffee (premiere), by Agatha Christie (her first play), December 1930, produced by André van Gyseghem, with Francis L. Sullivan as Poirot and also featuring Donald Wolfit.
- Carpet Slippers, December 1930, with Griffith Jones (his debut) and Sebastian Shaw
- Mary Broome, by Allan Monkhouse, December 1931, with Robert Donat and Herbert Lomas. This was a sudden and (still) unexplained substitution for the play originally announced, namely Chimneys by Agatha Christie
- Romeo and Juliet, February 1932, produced by A. R. Whatmore, with Sebastian Shaw as Romeo, Cecil Parker as Mercutio and George Coulouris as Tybalt

== Ronald Adam years ==
Control then passed to Ronald Adam (also known as Ronald Adams), who remained at the helm until 1939. During that time, he made over 150 new productions and revivals, of which over thirty were then transferred to various theatres in the West End. The Embassy school of acting was opened in the theatre in 1932. Some of the more notable productions at the theatre were:

- Miracle at Verdun by Hans Chlumberg (translated by Edward Crankshaw), September 1932, produced by André van Gyseghem, with Derrick de Marney, George Howe, Alan Wheatley. The production was then transferred to the Comedy.
- Ten Minute Alibi (premiere), by Anthony Armstrong, January 1933, with Robert Douglas and Celia Johnson. The production then transferred to the Haymarket.
- The Glass Wall (premiere), by E. M. Delafield, February 1933, produced by André van Gyseghem, with Max Adrian.
- All God's Chillun Got Wings, March 1933, produced by André van Gyseghem, with Paul Robeson and Flora Robson.
- Sometimes Even Now (premiere), by Warren Chetham-Strode, May 1933, with Jack Hawkins, Celia Johnson, Marie Lohr
- Napoleon, September 1934, produced by André van Gyseghem, with Edward Chapman, John Clements, Violet Farebrother, Eric Portman, Margaret Rawlings.
- The Dominant Sex (premiere), by Michael Egan, December 1934, with Diana Churchill, Richard Bird, René Ray. The production then transferred to the Shaftesbury.
- Stevedore, by Paul Peters and George Sklar, May 1935, produced by André van Gyseghem, with Paul Robeson, Robert Adams, Kathleen Davis.
- This Desirable Residence, by A. R. Rawlinson, May 1935, with Coral Browne
- Close Quarters (premiere), by W. O. Somin and Gilbert Lennox, June 1935, with Oskar Homolka (London debut), Flora Robson. The production then transferred to the Haymarket.
- Rivals! (premiere), by Herbert Hughes and John Robert Monsell, September 1935, with Winifred Campbell, Frederick Ranalow, Bruce Carfax, and Elsie French. Staged by Vladimir Rosing.
- Professor Bernhardi, June 1936, with Abraham Sofaer in the title role. and Max Adrian, Noel Howlett The production then transferred to the Phoenix.
- Judgment Day (London premiere), by Elmer Rice, May 1937, with Glynis Johns, Catherine Lacey, George Woodbridge The production then transferred to the Strand.
- Three Set Out, by Philip Leaver, June 1937, directed by Margaret Webster, with Constance Cummings and Michael Redgrave
- Profit and Loss, May 1938, produced by André van Gyseghem, with Mabel Love (final appearance)
- Julius Caesar, November 1939, in modern dress, with Joseph O'Conor (debut), Peter Copley, Hugh Griffith, Eric Portman

Ronald Adam's own list of significant transfers in that period was Ten Minute Alibi, Close Quarters, The Dominant Sex, Professor Bernhardi, Judgment Day.

== Post-war period ==
After war damage, the building was reopened in 1945, with a capacity of 678. It was then run until 1954 by Anthony Hawtrey. Notable productions included:

- Quality Street, February 1945, directed by Anthony Hawtrey, with Joyce Blair (making her debut, aged 13), Ursula Howells (making her London debut), Geoffrey Toone, Bryan Forbes, Gwendoline Watford, Linden Travers
- Myself a Stranger, August 1945, with Jack Allen, Hugh Burden, Cecil Ramage
- Fit for Heroes, September 1945, directed by Henry Kendall, with Irene Vanbrugh, Helen Cherry, Jack Allen, Raymond Lovell, Olaf Pooley.
- The Gambler, adapted by Norman Ginsbury from Dostoevsky, November 1945, directed by Sebastian Shaw, with Hugh Burden, Ferdy Mayne, Gwendoline Watford.
- Red Roses for Me, by Seán O'Casey, February 1946, with Kieron O'Hanrahan, Eddie Byrne
- National Velvet, 1946.
- Sense and Sensibility, 1946.
- Mrs Dane's Defence, 1946, with Mary Ellis.
- Hattie Stowe, February 1947
- Miranda, June 1947, directed by Richard Bird, with Nora Swinburne, Ronald Ward, Diane Hart
- Torwatletie, 1948, by Robert McLellan, with Roddy McMillan in the title role, production by Unity Players touring from Glasgow
- Portrait of Hickory, April 1948, with Judy Campbell.
- The Father (August Strindberg), November 1948, with Michael Redgrave
- A Woman in Love ("Amoureuse"), April 1949, adapted and directed by Michael Redgrave, with Margaret Rawlings
- On Monday Next (premiere), by Philip King, April 1949, with Henry Kendall, directed by him and Shaun Sutton, also with Leslie Phillips
- Othello, July 1949, produced by André van Gyseghem, with Michael Aldridge in the title role, and Peter Wyngarde, Maxine Audley.
- The Happy Family, March 1951, with Henry Kendall, Thora Hird and Tom Gill
- Caro William, premiere 1952, with Robert Shaw (London debut), Rachel Gurney.
- The Merchant of Yonkers, 1952, directed by André van Gyseghem, with Robert Eddison, Raymond Lovell, Sophie Stewart, Alfie Bass, Esma Cannon, Peter Baylis, Nigel Hawthorne
- Uranium 235, by Ewan MacColl, May 1952, produced by Joan Littlewood with Harry H. Corbett, George A. Cooper, Avis Bunnage.
- Hamlet, March 1953 with Laurence Payne in the title role, George Coulouris, Christine Finn
- Twelfth Night 1953 with George Coulouris, Christine Finn
- The Boy Friend (premiere for full version) 1953 with Hugh Paddick.

In 1953, it was sold to Sidney Bernstein, with management by screenwriter and playwright Wolf Mankowitz. Notable productions included:

- The Bespoke Overcoat, 1954
- The Lion in the Lighthouse, June 1955, with Henry Kendall (actor)
- The World of Sholem Aleichem, ca. 1955
- The Boychik, ca. 1956

== Central School ==
The theatre was sold to the Royal Central School of Speech and Drama, who continue as the resident company, in 1956.

Notable productions have included the premiere of Mad Forest in 1990.

== General references ==
- John Parker (1947). Who's Who in the Theatre (tenth ed.). London: Sir Isaac Pitman and Sons.
- Rob Wilton Theatricalia: Other Plays 1900-1939
- Rob Wilton Theatricalia: Other Plays 1940-1949
- Rob Wilton Theatricalia: Other Plays 1950-1959
