= Mary Hutton =

Mary Hutton may refer to:

- Mary Hutton (activist) (born 1939), Australian founder of the Free the Bears Fund
- Mary Hutton (poet) (1794–1859), English writer from Yorkshire
- Mary Hutton (principal) (1883–1964), Australian educator
- Mary Ann Hutton (1862–1953), Irish language scholar and writer
