= Rivals! =

1935 stage musical

- Written by: John Robert Monsell
- Music by: Herbert Hughes
- Original language: English
- Genre: Musical comedy
- Setting: Bath, Somerset, 1775

Premiere
- Date premiered: 16 September 1935
- Place premiered: Grand Theatre, Leeds

Rivals! is a British musical comedy. It is an adaptation of Richard Brinsley Sheridan's 1775 play The Rivals with music by Herbert Hughes and the book and lyrics by John Robert Monsell. It first appeared at the Grand Theatre in Leeds before making its London premiere at the Embassy Theatre in Hampstead. It then transferred to Kingsway Theatre in the West End where it ran for 86 performances from 23 October 1935 to 4 January 1936. The cast included Winifred Campbell as Lydlia Languish, Bruce Carfax as Captain Jack Absolute and Elsie French as Mrs Malaprop.

== Bibliography ==
- Quinn, Arianne Johnson. British and American Musical Theatre Exchanges in the West End (1924-1970. Springer International Publishing, 2023.
- Wearing, J. P. The London Stage 1930-1939: A Calendar of Productions, Performers, and Personnel. Rowman & Littlefield, 2014.
