= Neal O'Boyle =

Irish Republican leader

Neal John O'Boyle, also known as NJ O'Boyle, was president of the Irish Republican Brotherhood from 1907 to 1910, succeeding John O'Leary in the role. Seán Ó Faoláin later characterised O'Boyle in Belfast and Tom Clarke in Dublin as typical of the 'older realists' of the movement in the period prior to the Easter Rising.

His family owned a Public House near Toome, one of many in the southern half of Duneane Parish with strong Republican traditions and he was one of the main negotiators for the IRB when they met with Clan na Gael in America. He was a member of the Cargin Amnesty Association which campaigned for the release of Irish political prisoners in Ireland and America. He was a leading advocate of the 1798 Centenary commemorations in Ulster, using it as a vehicle to further Fenianism. A leading figure in the Cargin William Orr '98 Club, he was also heavily associated with the Cargin Emmet Republican Flute Band which he brought with him while travelling throughout Ireland.

Through the intervention of Bulmer Hobson, an ageing O'Boyle relinquished his position as Ulster representative on the Supreme Council in favour of Denis McCullough.

At times it was felt that O'Boyle was singlehandedly maintaining the IRB in Antrim, maintaining recruitment in his local area around Toome and in Belfast. As a businessman working in Belfast, he was a member of the National Literary Club, a clandestine IRB group, and the Henry Joy McCracken Literary Society alongside Alice Milligan and Anna Johnston (the poet Ethna Carbery). A prominent member of the '98 Centenary Clubs, he was also a devotee of the United Irishmen theology.

O'Boyle was born within Duneane Parish, near Toome in an area known as Cargin, Co Antrim in the townland of Staffordstown. A noted orator, and with excellent commercial acuity, he was also a committed Nationalist who travelled incessantly promoting the Fenian message and a large supporter of the Land League and Fishermen's Rights on Lough Neagh.

In a highly publicised event, he unveiled a Memorial Cross over his former comrade John O'Leary's grave in Glasnevin Cemetery, Dublin, May 1909

Following his death at his Staffordstown home in January 1912, he was buried at the Sacred Heart Church, Cargin in Toome, Co Antrim, with the Rev J McConnell delivering the Mass.
