= Charlotte Fox =

Charlotte Fox may refer to:

- Charlotte Fox (mountaineer) (1957–2018), American mountaineer
- Charlotte Kate Fox (born 1985), American actress and musician
- Charlotte Milligan Fox (1864–1916), Irish composer and music collector
- Charlotte Fox, see Bill Cosby sexual assault cases
