= The Rivals =

Play by Richard Brinsley Sheridan

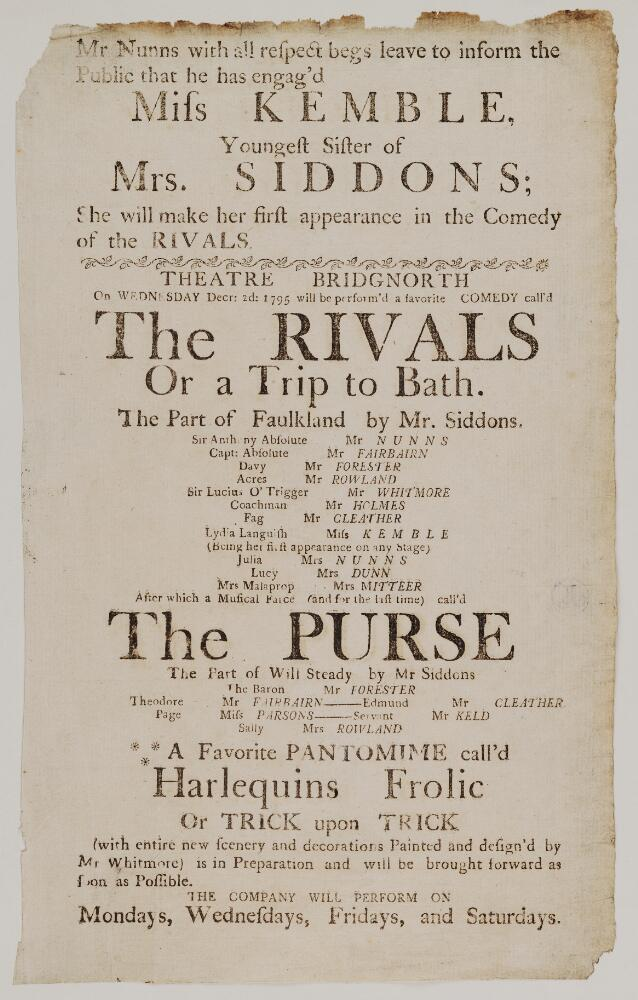
- 1795 playbill
- Written by: Richard Brinsley Sheridan
- Characters: Sir Anthony Absolute; Captain Jack Absolute; Faulkland; Bob Acres; Sir Lucius O'Trigger; Mrs Malaprop; Lydia Languish; Julia Melville; Lucy
- Genre: Comedy of manners
- Setting: Bath, 18th century

Premiere
- Date: 17 January 1775
- Place: Theatre Royal, Covent Garden

The Rivals is a five-act comedy of manners by Richard Brinsley Sheridan. first performed at the Theatre Royal, Covent Garden, London, on 17 January 1775. It was his first play.

The plot concerns a young couple, Jack Absolute and Lydia Languish, and the complications of their courtship. They are finally united despite the unhelpful interventions of Jack's father, Sir Anthony, and Lydia's aunt, Mrs Malaprop, as well as two further suitors of Lydia's – a bellicose Irishman and an English country bumpkin. A sub-plot depicts another young couple – Julia Melville and her fiancé, Jack's friend, Faulkland – whose romance is disrupted by Faulkland's obsessive jealousy, but has a similarly happy ending. The best-known character in the play is Mrs Malaprop, known for her ludicrous confusion of similar sounding words, who has given her name to malapropisms.

The play was not well received at its premiere and was taken off after a single performance. Sheridan thoroughly revised it and when it was staged shortly afterwards it became and has remained a success.

== Background ==
The Rivals was Sheridan's first play. At the time, he was a young newlywed living in Bath. After their marriage his wife, Eliza (born Elizabeth Linley), gave up her successful career as a singer. She could have continued to earn a substantial income but she disliked performing in public and Sheridan, who was class-conscious, thought it unbecoming for a gentleman's wife to sing for money. Thomas Harris, the manager of the Theatre Royal, Covent Garden, invited him to write a play, and having read Sheridan's script he predicted great success and at least £600 in royalties for the author. (Note: According to calculations based on the Consumer Price Index measure of inflation, £600 in 1775 is approximately £80,000 in 2025.)

The play, set in Bath, draws on works written by Sheridan's mother – a novel, Memoirs of Miss Sidney Bidulph, and an unfinished play, A Journey to Bath, in which the word-mangling Mrs Tryfort is a forerunner of Mrs Malaprop. Sir Anthony Absolute resembles Sir Sampson Legend in Congreve's Restoration comedy Love for Love, and according to the biographer A. Norman Jeffares has echoes of "a father as domineering and opinionated as Sheridan's own".

== Premiere ==
The Rivals was first performed at Covent Garden on 17 January 1775. The first night audience rejected the play. It was criticised for being derivative of earlier comedies, for its excessive length, for its crude comedy, for its excess of malapropisms and for the character of Sir Lucius O'Trigger, an unpalatably harsh caricature of an Irishman. The acting was not good: according to The Morning Post, Edward Shuter as Sir Anthony "did not know any two lines together, and wherever he was out, he tried to fill the interval with oaths and buffoonery", and John Lee as O'Trigger also did not know his lines, and his Irish accent was "a horrid mixture of discordant brogues, an uncouth dialect, neither Welch, English nor Irish".

In addition to the perceived faults of the play and the inadequacy of some of the acting, the performance was hampered by the presence in the audience of a vociferous anti-Sheridan claque, inspired by a rival playwright. The play was withdrawn immediately after the debacle of the premiere and Sheridan revised it in eleven days.

== Revised version ==
Sheridan's second version of the play opened at Covent Garden on 28 January 1775. The text differed substantially from that of the first night. Revising it, Sheridan strove to refine it. He removed all indelicate jokes and offensive terms such as "whore"; he confined malapropisms to Mrs Malaprop herself; and he softened the satire of the Irish, making O'Trigger a proud patriot rather than an unscrupulous fortune hunter. The Morning Chronicle commented that the original had "some imperfections" and had subsequently "undergone some alterations" with the result that "the play in its present state has received such marks of general approbation" that it called for a detailed account of the piece. David Garrick, who ran the rival Drury Lane theatre, was at the first night of the rewritten play and commented at the end, "I see this play will run".

Between the twenty-eight-night run of the revised version – viewed as a good run at the time – and the first revival, in April 1776, Sheridan collaborated with his father-in-law and brother-in-law, the composers Thomas Linley the elder and the younger, on the comic opera The Duenna. This was produced at Covent Garden in November 1775 and was an outstanding success, establishing Sheridan's position in the London theatre and for a while eclipsing The Rivals in popularity. The opera ran for seventy-four nights – a strikingly long run for the time. (Note: No theatrical piece lasted for over a hundred performances in London until well into the nineteenth century.) For the first revival of the revised version of the play, it was advertised as "Written by the Author of the Duenna". There were revivals of The Rivals at Drury Lane in 1777, the Haymarket in 1792, Covent Garden in 1795 and Drury Lane in 1796. The Internet Broadway Database (IBDB) records one New York production in the eighteenth century, in April 1778. August von Kotzebue staged the piece in Germany in the same year.

== Characters ==
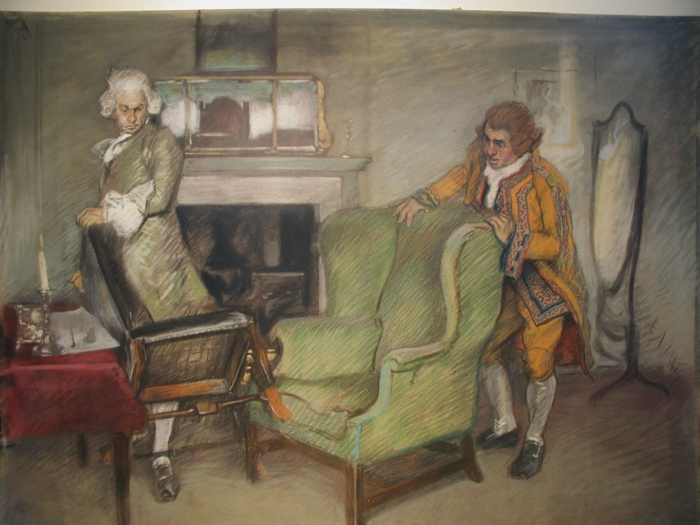
Bob Acres and His Servant, illustration by Edwin Austin Abbey, c. 1895

- Sir Anthony Absolute, a wealthy baronet
- Captain Jack Absolute, his son, disguised as Ensign Beverley
- Faulkland, friend of Jack Absolute
- Bob Acres, friend of Jack Absolute
- Sir Lucius O'Trigger, an Irish baronet
- Fag, Captain Absolute's servant
- David, Bob Acres's servant
- Thomas, Sir Anthony's servant
- Lydia Languish, a wealthy teenaged heiress, in love with "Ensign Beverley"
- Mrs Malaprop, Lydia's middle-aged guardian
- Julia Melville, a young relation of the Absolutes, in love with Faulkland
- Lucy, Lydia's conniving maid

== Plot ==
The play is set in 18th-century Bath, a fashionable spa town. The plot is about two young lovers, Lydia and Jack. Lydia, who is addicted to popular novels, wants a purely romantic love affair. To court her, Jack pretends to be "Ensign Beverley", a poor junior army officer. Lydia is enthralled with the idea of eloping with a penniless soldier in spite of the objections of her guardian, Mrs Malaprop, a moralistic widow. Mrs Malaprop is the chief comic figure of the play, thanks to her continual misuse of words that sound like the words she intends to use, but mean something different (the term malapropism, current from the early 19th century was coined in reference to the character).

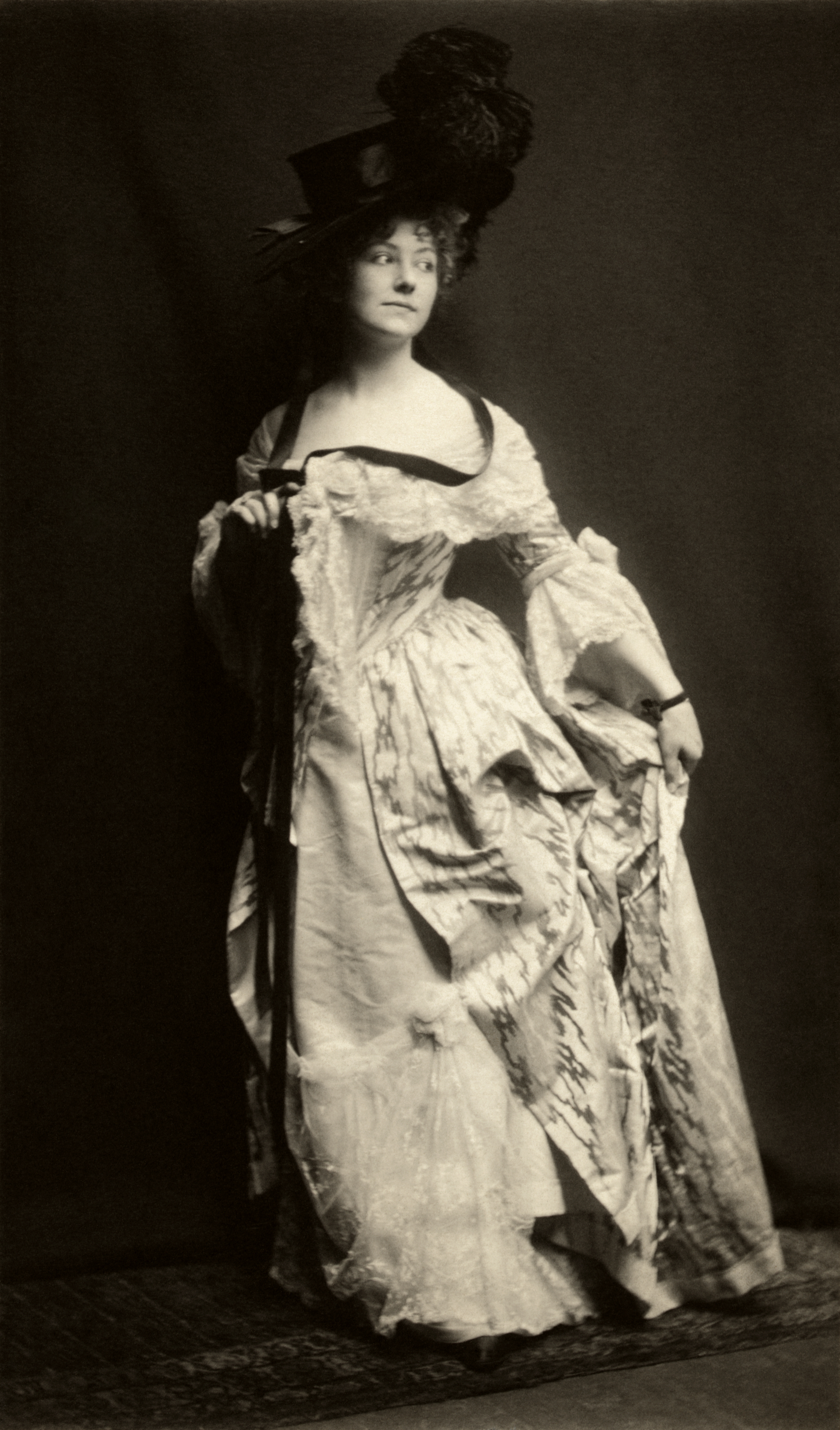
Elsie Leslie as Lydia Languish in The Rivals, 1899. Photograph by Zaida Ben-Yusuf.

Lydia has two other suitors, Bob Acres (a somewhat buffoonish country gentleman) and Sir Lucius O'Trigger, an impoverished and combative Irish baronet. Sir Lucius pays Lucy to carry love notes between him and Lydia (who uses the name "Delia"), but Lucy is deceiving him: "Delia" is in fact Mrs Malaprop.

As the play opens, Sir Anthony arrives suddenly in Bath. He has arranged a marriage for Jack but Jack demurs, saying he is in love already. They quarrel violently but Jack soon learns through the gossip of Lucy and Fag that the marriage arranged by Sir Anthony is, in fact, with Lydia. He makes a great show of submission to his father, and is presented to Lydia with Mrs Malaprop's blessing. Jack confides to Lydia that he is only posing as Sir Anthony's son. She annoys Mrs Malaprop by loudly professing her eternal devotion to "Beverley" while rejecting "Jack Absolute".

Jack's friend Faulkland is in love with Julia but he suffers from jealous suspicion; he constantly frets about her fidelity. Faulkland and Julia quarrel foolishly, making elaborate and high-flown speeches about true love that satirise the romantic dramas of the period.

Bob Acres tells Sir Lucius that another man ("Beverley") is courting the lady of Acres's choice (Lydia, though Sir Lucius does not know this). Sir Lucius immediately declares that Acres must challenge "Beverley" to a duel and kill him. Acres goes along, and writes out a challenge note – despite his rather less belligerent inclinations and the misgivings of his servant, David. Sir Lucius leaves, Jack arrives and Acres tells him of his intent. Jack agrees to deliver the note to "Beverley" but declines to be Acres's second.

Mrs Malaprop again presents Jack to Lydia but this time with Sir Anthony present, exposing Jack's pose as "Beverley". Lydia is enraged by the puncturing of her romantic dreams and spurns Jack contemptuously. Sir Lucius has also learned of the proposed marriage of Jack and Lydia and determines to challenge Jack. He meets Jack, who, smarting from Lydia's rejection, agrees to fight him without even knowing the reason. They will meet at the same time as Acres is scheduled to fight "Beverley".

At the duelling ground, Acres is reluctant to fight but Sir Lucius will have no shirking. Jack and Faulkland arrive. Acres learns that "Beverley" is actually his friend Jack and begs off from their duel. Jack is quite willing to fight Sir Lucius and they cross swords.

David informs Mrs Malaprop, Lydia, Julia and Sir Anthony of the duel and they all rush off to stop it. Sir Lucius explains the cause of his challenge but Lydia denies any connection to him and admits her love for Jack. Mrs Malaprop announces that she is Delia but Sir Lucius recoils in horror, realising that he has been hoaxed. Sir Anthony consoles Mrs Malaprop, Julia is reconciled to Faulkland and Acres invites everyone to a party.

== Revivals and adaptations ==
The play was revived on London stages fifty times during the nineteenth century and there were productions there in every decade of the twentieth. A West End production starring Ralph Richardson and Margaret Rutherford (later Isabel Jeans) ran for a record 363 performances from 6 October 1966. According to Les Archives du spectacle the first production in Paris (as Les Rivaux) was in 2019, although Sheridan's other well-known comedy, The School for Scandal (L'École du scandale) had been given there as early as 1824. IBDB records two productions in the nineteenth century, six in the twentieth and one in the twenty-first.

The BBC broadcast six radio adaptations of the play beginning in 1935. The casts included Athene Seyler, Fay Compton, Flora Robson and Patricia Routledge as Mrs Malaprop, Baliol Holloway, Peter Pratt and Geoffrey Palmer as Sir Anthony, and in other roles, Fenella Fielding, Hugh Burden, Sara Crowe and David Bamber.

The BBC's first television adaptation was in 1938, with further versions in 1948, 1970 and 1988. Among those taking part were Andrew Cruickshank and Donald Sinden as Sir Anthony, Beryl Reid and Sheila Hancock as Mrs Malaprop, and in other roles Jeremy Brett, Patrick Ryecart, T. P. McKenna and Ronald Pickup.

A musical adaptation – titled Rivals!, with songs by Herbert Hughes and lyrics by John Robert Monsell – was staged by Vladimir Rosing at the Kingsway Theatre, London, in October 1935. It ran for 86 performances. A later musical adaptation, called All in Love, was made by Jacques Urbont (music) and Bruce Geller (words). It opened at the May Fair Theatre, London in March 1964, with a cast including Ronnie Barker, James Fox, Peter Gilmore, Mary Millar, Peter Pratt and Annie Ross. It was not a success and closed within a month.

== Awards and nominations ==
=== 2004 Broadway revival ===
Year	Award	Category	Nominee	Result
2005	Tony Awards	Best Featured Actress in a Play	Dana Ivey	Nominated
2005	Tony Awards	Best Costume Design of a Play	Jess Goldstein	Won

== Notes, references and sources ==
=== Sources ===
- Adams, Joseph Quincy, Jr (June 1910). "The Text of Sheridan's The Rivals". Modern Language Notes. 25 (6): 171–173. doi:10.2307/2916916. JSTOR 2916916.
- Gaye, Freda, ed. (1967). Who's Who in the Theatre (fourteenth ed.). London: Sir Isaac Pitman and Sons. OCLC 5997224.
- Herbert, Ian, ed. (1977). Who's Who in the Theatre (sixteenth ed.). London and Detroit: Pitman Publishing and Gale Research. ISBN 978-0-273-00163-8.
- Parker, John, ed. (1925). Who's Who in the Theatre (fifth ed.). London: Sir Isaac Pitman and Sons. OCLC 10013159.
- Stern, Tiffany (2004). "Introduction". The Rivals. London: A. & C. Black. ISBN 978-0-71-366765-3.
- Wearing, J. P (2014). The London Stage 1930–1939: A Calendar of Productions, Performers, and Personnel. Lanham: Rowman & Littlefield. ISBN 978-0-81-089304-7.
