= Joseph Campbell (poet) =

Joseph Campbell or Seosamh Mac Cathmhaoil
- Born: 15 July 1879; Belfast, Ireland
- Died: 6 June 1944 (aged 64); Lacken Daragh, Enniskerry
- Occupations: Scholar and poet
- Notable work: My Lagan Love
- Spouse: Nancy Maude

Joseph Campbell (15 July 1879 – 6 June 1944) was an Irish poet and lyricist. He wrote under the Irish form of his name Seosamh Mac Cathmhaoil (also Seosamh MacCathmhaoil), Campbell being a common anglicization of the old Irish name MacCathmhaoil. He is now remembered best for words he supplied to traditional airs, such as My Lagan Love and Gartan Mother's Lullaby; his verse was also set to music by Arnold Bax and Ivor Gurney.

== Life ==
He was born in Belfast, into a Catholic and Irish nationalist family from County Down. He was one of ten children and his Catholic-Presbyterian parents gave him an life-long interest in politics and Gaelic culture. He was educated at St Malachy's College, Belfast. After working for his father he taught for a while.In 1900 he joined the Gaelic League and became fluent in the Irish language.

He travelled to Dublin in 1902, meeting leading nationalist figures. His literary activities began with songs, as a collector in Antrim and working with the composer Herbert Hughes. He was then a founder of the Ulster Literary Theatre in 1904. He contributed a play, The Little Cowherd of Slainge, and several articles to its journal Uladh edited by Bulmer Hobson. The Little Cowherd of Slainge was performed by the ULT at the Clarence Place Hall in Belfast on 4 May 1905, along with Lewis Purcell's The Enthusiast.

He moved to Dublin in 1905, failed to find work and the following year (1906) he moved to London where he was involved in Irish literary activities while working as a teacher. He married in 1910 Nancy Maude, and they moved shortly to Dublin, and then County Wicklow. His play Judgement was performed at the Abbey Theatre in April 1912.

He was one of the founders of the Irish Volunteers in 1913. He took part as a supporter in the Easter Rising of 1916, doing rescue work. The following year he published a translation from Irish of the short stories of Patrick Pearse, one of the leaders of the Rising.

He became a Sinn Féin Councillor in Wicklow in 1921. Later in the Irish Civil War he was on the Republican side, and was interned in 1922/3 for seventeen months. His prison diaries from this time were published in 2001.

His marriage broke up in 1924, and he emigrated to the United States in 1925. There he lived in New York City. He lectured at Fordham University, and worked in academic Irish studies, founding the university's School of Irish Studies in 1928, which lasted four years. He was the editor of The Irish Review, a short lived (April, May and July 1934) "magazine of Irish expression". The business manager was George G. Lennon, former Officer Commanding of the County Waterford Flying Column during the Irish War of Independence. The managing editor was Lennon's brother-in-law, George H. Sherwood.

Campbell returned to Ireland in 1939, settling at Glencree, County Wicklow. He wrote some poetry and made several programmes with Radio Éireann.

He died at Lacken Daragh, Enniskerry on 6 June 1944.

== Family ==
His brother John Patrick Campbell (1883–1962) was an illustrator and designer; the writer Ethna Carbery was his cousin.

== Works ==
- Songs of Uladh (1904) with Seaghan Campbell
- The Old Woman by Joseph Campbell
- The Little Cowherd of Slainge (1904) play
- The Garden of the Bees (1905) poems
- The Rush-Light (1906) poems (illustrated by his brother John)
- The Man-Child (1907) poems
- The Gilly of Christ (1907) poems
- The Mountainy Singer (1909) poems
- Mearing Stones (1911) travel writing
- Judgment: A Play (1912)
- Irishry (1913) poems
- Earth of Cualann (1917) poems
- Collected Poems of Joseph Campbell (1963)
- As I was Among the Captives: Joseph Campbell's Prison Diary (2001), edited by Eiléan Ní Chuilleanáin
- I Will Go with My Father A-Ploughing
- Four Irish Songs (n.d.) by Charlottr Milligan Fox, illustrations as Seaghan MacCathmhaiol.

== See also ==
- John Patrick Campbell, his brother
- List of Irish writers
