= The Shan Van Vocht =

First issue, January 1896

The Shan Van Vocht (a phonetic rendering in English spelling of the Irish phrase An tSean bhean Bhocht - "The Poor Old Woman") was the name of a song, dating to the period of the Irish rebellion of 1798 that, once printed, gained notoriety in nineteenth century Ireland as a seditious text. In the 1890s it was adopted as the title of a popular historical novel and of a nationalist magazine, both of which, in the face of the growing sectarian division over Irish Home rule, sought to vindicate the republican legacy of the United Irishmen.

== Political ballad ==
The earliest reference to the song dates from 1797, and is clearly contemporary: The Shan Van Vogt declares that the French are at hand, and will rescue Ireland. The troops are called together; they will wear green; they will free Ireland and proclaim liberty. Written versions (in which it was sometimes spelt Shan van Vough) appeared first in the 1820, and were employed in the campaigns Daniel O'Connell led, first for Catholic Emancipation, and then, in the 1830s and '40s, for the restoration of an Irish parliament through a repeal of the 1800 Acts of Union. The journalist and nationalist politician A. A. Sullivan observed that in thirty years he "never knew an Irish election poet that did not invoke the Shan Van Vocht".

== Novel by James Murphy (1888) ==
The public was reminded of the song's original association with the United Irishmen and the '98 rebellion when, in 1885, the Weekly News serialised James Murphy's novel The Shan Van Vocht: the story of the United Irishmen. Set to the background of the French expedition to Lough Swilly, County Donegal, in October 1798, it relates the circumstances that led to the death of the United Irish leader, Theobald Wolfe Tone. It went through several editions as a popular book.

== Nationalist journal (1896–1899) ==
In 1896 in Belfast, Alice Milligan and Anna Johnston (pseud. Ethna Carbery) chose The Shan Van Vocht as the title for their independent monthly. The two-penny journal followed the formula that in the 1840s had launched Gavan Duffy's Young Ireland paper The Nation: a mixture of poetry, serialised fiction, Irish history, political analysis and announcements.

The cover page of the January 1896 inaugural issue, featured "a version of the song that clarified for the modern reader that the title alluded to the female personification of the nation: 'for old Ireland is the name of the Shan Van Vocht'." The line that most clearly expressed the aspiration for republican separatism was adopted as the journal's motto: "Yes Ireland shall be free, from the centre to the sea, and hurrah for liberty says the Shan van Vocht".

After forty issues, in 1899 Milligan and Johnston passed their subscription list to Arthur Griffith's new Dublin-based weekly, the United Irishman, organ of Cumann na nGaedheal, the forerunner of Sinn Féin.

== See also ==
The Sean-Bhean bhocht
