= Edward Coey Bigger =

Irish politician and physician (1861–1942)

Senator
- In office 17 September 1925 – 29 May 1936

Personal details
- Born: 1861 Belfast, Ireland
- Died: 1 June 1942 (aged 80–81) County Kildare, Ireland
- Party: Independent
- Spouse: Maude Coulter Warwick (m. 1886; died 1926)
- Children: 2, including Joseph
- Relatives: Francis Joseph Bigger (brother)
- Education: Queen's University Belfast; London Hospital

Sir Edward Coey Bigger (1861 – 1 June 1942) was an Irish politician and physician. He was an independent member of Seanad Éireann from 1925 to 1936. He was first elected to the Seanad at the 1925 election for 9 years. He was re-elected at the 1934 election for 3 years.

He was chair of the Irish Public Health Council and Medical Member of Local Government Board, Ireland. In 1917 he was the author of a report to the Carnegie United Kingdom Trust on the physical welfare of mothers and children in Ireland.

Bigger was the Crown Representative for Ireland on the British General Medical Council from 1917 to 1927. He was chair of the Central Midwives Board for Ireland (1918–1942). He was the inaugural Chair of first the General Nursing Council for Ireland from 1920 and then the General Nursing Council for the Irish Free State from 1929. He was on the Joint Nursing and Midwives’ Council for Northern Ireland at the time of his death in 1942. He was on the Royal College of Nursing Council 1924-1932.

He was knighted in the 1921 New Year Honours for his contribution to public health.

One of his brothers was Francis Joseph Bigger. His son Joseph Warwick Bigger was a senator from 1947 to 1951.
