= Alice Furlong =

Irish writer, poet and political activist

- Born: 26 November 1866; Old Bawn, County Dublin
- Died: 1946
- Education: Dr Steevens' Hospital
- Occupations: Writer, poet, Political activist
- Writing career
- Language: Irish, English
- Movement: Inghinidhe na hÉireann

Alice Furlong (26 November 1866 – 1946) was an Irish writer, poet and political activist who also worked on Irish publications with Douglas Hyde (later President of Ireland).

== Life ==
She was born at Old Bawn, near Tallaght, County Dublin, the daughter of John Furlong, a sporting journalist. She trained as a nurse at Dr Steevens' Hospital. In the 1890s, her father was injured in a race-course accident and ended up in her ward, where he died shortly afterward, and her mother died two months later. Her first literary contributions were to the Irish Monthly at age 16.

In 1899, Furlong published Roses and Rue, favourably reviewed by Stopford Brooke and others, and in 1907 Tales of Fairy Folk and Queens and Heroes. Her verse appeared in several anthologies. She contributed to several journals, including the Irish Monthly, the Weekly Freeman, Chambers's Journal, and the nationalist Shan Van Vocht, run by Alice Milligan, and Anna Johnston (Ethna Carbery). After 1916 she started studying Irish, and in the 1920s published poems in Irish and translated from Irish, and added the Irish Press to the journals she contributed to.

In 1900 she was a founder-member of Inghinidhe na hÉireann, the revolutionary women's organisation led by Maud Gonne. Furlong was elected a vice-president of the association, along with Jennie Wyse Power, Annie Egan and Anna Johnston.

Two of her sisters, Katherine and Mary, also wrote poetry, but died young, while another sister, Margaret, married the songwriter P. J. McCall.
