= Francis Joseph Bigger =

Irish antiquarian (1863–1926)

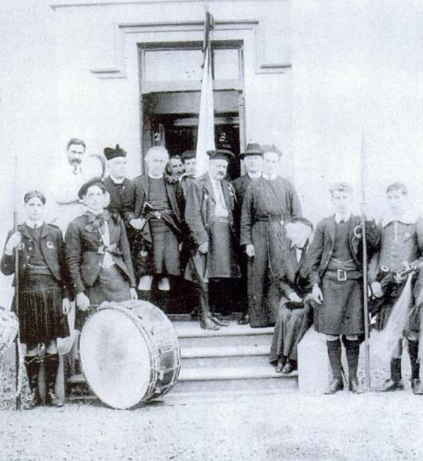
On the steps of Ard Righ c. 1914: Bigger (centre), Roger Casement (back row, left) and what may be a west Belfast troop of Na Fianna Éireann

Francis Joseph Bigger (1863 – 9 December 1926) was an Irish antiquarian, revivalist, solicitor, architect, author, editor, Member of the Royal Irish Academy, and Fellow of the Royal Society of Antiquaries of Ireland. His collected library, now distributed across several public institutions, comprised more than 18,000 books, journals, letters, photographs, sketches, maps, and other materials. His house in Belfast was a gathering place for Irish nationalist politicians, artists, scholars, and others. He was a prolific sponsor and promoter of Gaelic culture, authored many works of his own, founded (or co-founded) several institutions, and revived and edited the Ulster Journal of Archaeology.

== Namesake confusion ==
The Belfast politician Joseph Biggar changed the spelling of his surname from Bigger to Biggar (when he converted to Catholicism), which caused people some confusion in the spelling of Francis Joseph Bigger's surname.

== Life ==
Bigger was born in 1863, in Belfast on Little Donegall Street. The seventh son of Joseph Bigger, of Belfast, and his wife Mary Jane (née Ardery) of Ballyvalley. He was educated at the Royal Belfast Academical Institution, one of whose original governors at its foundation in 1810 was his grandfather David Bigger, and one of whose governors during his education there was his father. One of his brothers was Edward Coey Bigger.

Bigger joined the Belfast Naturalists' Field Club, and was later its secretary and its president. He became a solicitor in 1888, and was also a Freemason. He also helped to organize the Glens Feis, a feis at Cushendall, out of a desire to promote Gaelic culture that also saw him join, and become a member of the executive committee of, the Gaelic League.

With the support of the veteran Irish-language revivalist Robert Shipboy MacAdam, who had founded and edited the publication's original series (1853-1862), in 1894 Bigger revived the Ulster Journal of Archaeology and he was to edit it until 1914. His active interest in archeology is still recalled by archeologists a century later, with sites that he had dug being known informally as "well and truly Biggered".

In 1911, Bigger bought Jordan's Castle in Ardglass which he restored, and bequeathed to the state.

As an architect, Bigger wrote a complaint to the Irish Independent, published on 2 March 1907, about plans for some cottages, in response to which the Independent invited him to present his own plans. He drew these up and the Independent published them as Labourers' Cottages for Ireland (Bigger 1907). Writer Jonathan Bell characterized these as the plans of an "eccentric antiquarian", as they deliberately excluded sinks from the design, Bigger claiming that "washing up is usually done in a bucket".

Regular visitors to his home in Belfast, Ardrigh House number 737b on Antrim Road, were Douglas Hyde, Roger Casement, and Francis McPeake. Casement often stayed with him when in Belfast. Bigger arranged lessons for McPeake in Irish traditional pipe music from John O'Reilly of Galway, paying for the Belfast lodgings of McPeake and O'Reilly, and giving additional money to O'Reilly's family. There is a long list of such visitors most of them Republicans and early separatists, known as the "Ardrigh coterie", including Stephen Gwynn, Padraic Colum, Anna Johnston, and Alice Milligan, and Captain Jack White, who with Casement in 1913 addressed a unique Protestant Home Rule meeting in Ballymoney.

A description of Ardrigh House can be found in chapter 4 of Joseph Connolly's Memoirs, Connolly & Gaughan 1996, p. 76, listed in further reading. Bigger himself spelled the house's name "Airdrie" in correspondence; it was demolished in 1986 in order to build a block of flats.

Bigger was the patron, and first president, of the Ulster Literary Theatre that was founded by in 1902 by another Belfast Gaelic Leaguer, Bulmer Hobson. This patronage extended to financing the theatre's journal, which was named Uladh (the word for Ulster in Irish), and writing an article, "Art and Culture in Old Belfast", for its first issue in 1904.

Bigger financed Songs of Uladh by another of his visitors, Herbert Hughes. The book was published in 1904, the result of a holiday to County Donegal taken by Bigger, who brought along Hughes and the two brothers John Patrick Campbell and Joseph Campbell. Hughes noted down the melodies of various folk songs during the holiday, which were then published in the Songs with words by Joseph and illustrative woodcuts by John.

Bigger strove to improve the standards of public houses, founding the Ulster Public House Association (a.k.a. the Ulster Public House Trust or Ulster Public House Reform Association). For his contributions to local history and archeology, Queen's University Belfast awarded him a master's degree in 1926. He died at home in 1926.

Bigger had at least one venture in electoral politics. In the general election of 1906, he was the election agent for J. A. M. Carlisle standing as an Independent Liberal Unionist in Belfast West. With Bigger's help, Carlisle managed just 153 votes, enough to help the Home Ruler, Joseph Devlin slip past the (conservative) Irish Unionist with a majority of 16..

== Works ==
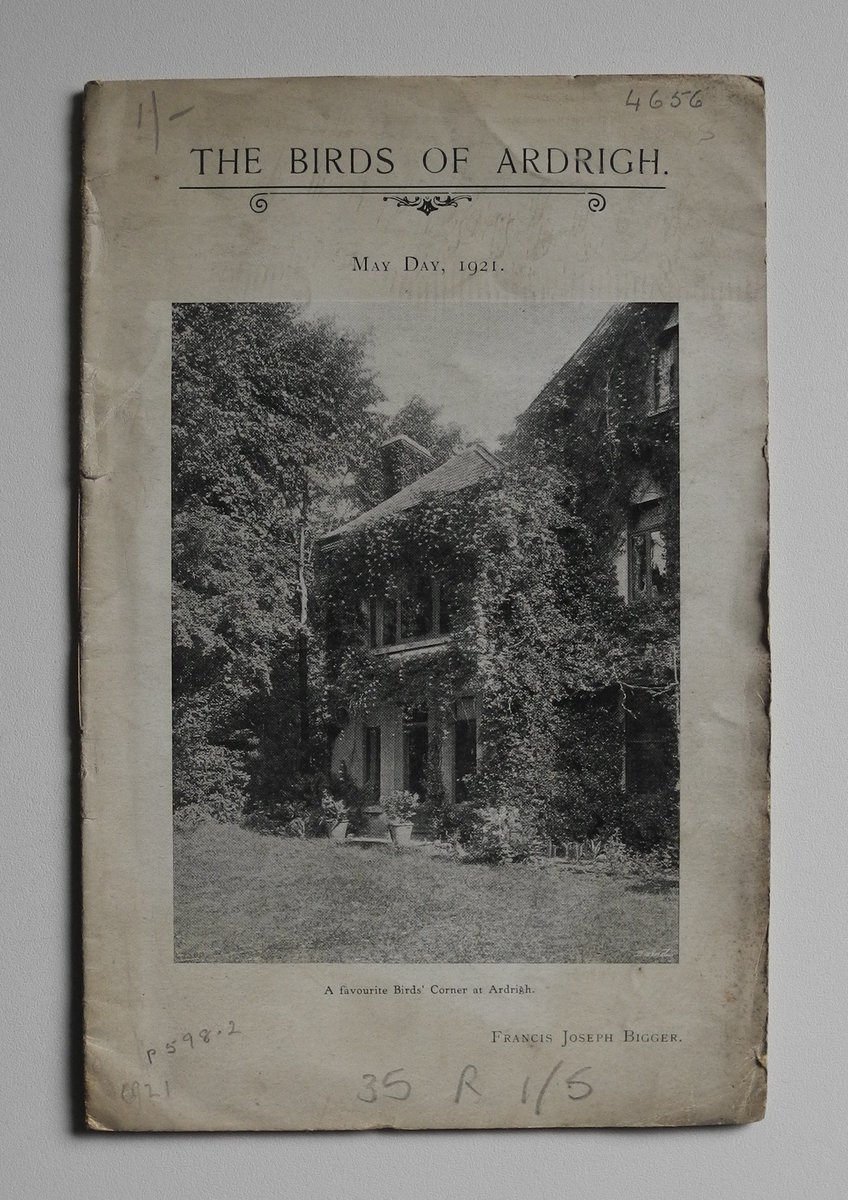
The front cover of Bigger's 1921 The Birds of Ardrigh has a photograph of Ardrigh, Bigger's house, taken from its south garden. This copy is in the University College Dublin's Special Collections.

A strong supporter of the revival of Irish language and culture, he wrote on those and many aspects of the archaeology of Northern Ireland. His best-known work is The Ulster Land War of 1770, and he also edited and contributed numerous articles to Ulster Journal of Archaeology.

Other works include his booklet The Hills of Holy Ireland, a diatribe against the British rule of Ireland that was based upon a lecture that Bigger gave in the Linen Hall Library, which was on display in the Belfast Central Library from 2007 to 2008 as part of an exhibition. He also wrote pamphlets entitled Irish Penal Crosses and The Northern Leaders of 98, a novel Aeneas O’Haughan, a collection of fireside stories Four Shots from Dawn.

With Herbert Hughes, Bigger also made a collection of just under 175 rubbings of the heraldic designs engraved on gravestones in County Antrim, which they published in the Ulster Journal of Archaeology in 1900 and 1901.

There is a partial list of Works by Francis Joseph Bigger at Open Library. Others not listed there and not aforementioned include:

- Bigger, Francis Joseph; Fennell, William J. "Antiquities". In Bigger, Francis Joseph; Praeger, R. Lloyd; Vinycomb, John (eds.). A guide to Belfast and the counties of Down & Antrim. (Antiquities at the Internet Archive)
- Bigger, Francis Joseph (1907). Labourers' Cottages for Ireland. Dublin: Independent Newspapers Limited.
- Bigger, Francis Joseph (1904). "Art and Culture in Old Belfast". Uladh. Vol. 1, no. 1. p. 12.

John Smyth Crone edited his Articles and Sketches (Bigger 1927), a selection of just some of his work, that was published after his death.

Other people's works that they dedicated to Bigger include Cathal O'Byrne's As I Roved Out and George A. Birmingham's The Northern Iron.

== Collections ==
A catalogue of his personal collection at his death is in Hackett, Moore & Lauder 1930, which runs to 302 pages. This comprised a significant fraction of the 1956 Catalogue of Belfast Central Library, the Bigger Collection having been presented to the Belfast Central Library by Bigger's brother (Lieutenant Colonel F.C. Bigger) a year after his death. The collection in the BCL runs to 10,000 books and journals, 3,500 letters of correspondence, and 180 boxes of scrapbooks, maps, and pamphlets. A further collection of 5,000 photographs is held separately at the Ulster Museum.

The bookplates that he used for his books have the motto: "Giving and Forgiving".

The curator of the 2007–2008 exhibition about him at the Belfast Central Library, Roger Dixon, described him as a "one man Irish Cultural Institute" in an accompanying pamphlet entitled Ireland's Cultural Visionary.

In the National Library of Ireland, photographs of his home, family, and associates are Ms. 21,543; and miscellaneous papers of his are Ms. 21,542. Other papers of his are held at the Linen Hall Library and at the Public Records Office of Northern Ireland.
