= Seumas MacManus =

Irish poet (1867 - 1960)

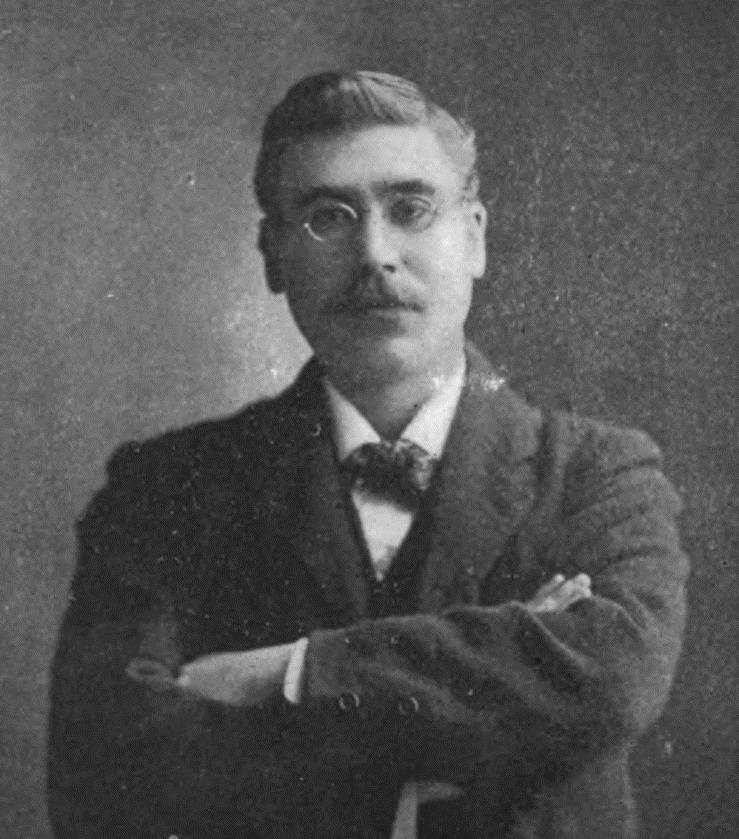
- Born: James McManus; 31 December 1867; Mountcharles, County Donegal
- Died: 23 October 1960 (aged 92); New York City, New York, U.S.
- Occupations: Author; poet
- Spouses: Ethna Carbery (m. 1901; died 1902) Catalina Violante Paez (m. 1911)

Seumas MacManus (31 December 1867 – 23 October 1960) was an Irish author, dramatist, and poet known for his ability to reinterpret Irish folktales for modern audiences.

== Biography ==
Born James McManus on 31 December 1867 in Mountcharles, County Donegal, he was the son of Patrick McManus, a merchant, and Mary Molloy.

He became a teacher, and in the 1890s began contributing articles and stories to newspapers in the US.

On 22 August 1901 he married the County Antrim poet, balladeer and publisher Ethna Carbery, daughter of a Fenian and one of the founders of the feminist nationalist organisation Inghinidhe na hÉireann, and they moved in together in Revlin House in Donegal. Carbery died the following year of gastritis, aged 37. MacManus published her hugely successful work for many years after her death.

On 9 March 1911 in Manhattan, New York, he married Catalina Violante Paez (died 1962), the granddaughter of a former Venezuelan president, General José Antonio Páez. The couple had two daughters: Mariquita Paez MacManus (1912–2011) and Patricia MacManus (1914–2005).

MacManus died on 23 October 1960 after falling from the seventh-floor window of the Mary Manning Walsh nursing home in New York City. He was 92.

== Evaluation ==
Seamus MacManus is considered by many to be the last great seanchaí, or storyteller of the ancient oral tradition. He wrote down and interpreted traditional stories so that they would not be lost to future generations. In one book, he encourages the reader to read the stories aloud and to others. "These tales were made not for reading, but for telling. They were made and told for the passing of long nights, for the shortening of weary journeys, for entertaining of traveler-guests, for brightening of cabin hearths. Be not content with reading them ... And grateful be to the shanachies who passed these tales to me, for you – Sean O'Hegarty, Mairghid Burns, Eoghain O'Cuinn, and the Bacach Ruadh. May God grant their souls rest." Archived recordings of MacManus reading his stories exist in Notre Dame and Seton Hall, and some of his books are available for download on the Internet Archive.

== Quotes ==
- Many a man's tongue broke his nose.
  - Heavy Hangs the Golden Grain (1950)

== Works ==
- The Bend of the Road (Dublin: M. H. Gill and Son, Ltd, 1898); 2nd ed, 1906
- Through the Turf Smoke: The Love, Lore, and Laughter of Old Ireland (New York: Doubleday & McClure Co, 1899)
- In Chimney Corners: Merry Tales of Irish Folk‐lore (1899)
- The Bewitched Fiddle and Other Irish Tales (1900)
- Donegal Fairy Stories (NY: McClure, Phillips & Co, 1900)
- A Lad of the O'Friels (1903; 1945)
- The Red Poocher (1903)
- Ballads of a Country Boy (1905)
- Lo, and Behold Ye (1905)
- Doctor Kilgannon (M. H. Gill and Son, 1907)
- Yourself and the Neighbors (1915)
- Top o' the Mornin' (1920)
- Tales that Were Told (1920)
- The Story of the Irish Race: A Popular History of Ireland (1921); 4th revised ed, 1944
- The Donegal Wonder Book (1926)
- The Well o' the World's End (1939)
- Dark Patrick (NY: Macmillan, 1939)
- The Rocky Road to Dublin (1947)
- Tales from Ireland (1949)
- We Sang for Ireland (1950)
- Heavy Hangs the Golden Grain (1950)
- The Bold Heroes of Hungry Hill, and Other Irish Folk Tales (1951)
- The Little Mistress of the Eskar Mor (1960)
- Hibernian Nights (1963)

Short stories

- "Sinn Fein" (North American Review, 16 August 1907)
- The Curse of the Heretic (1910)
- 5 Minutes a Millionaire (1911)
- A County Clare Angel (Cosmopolitan, vol. 33, May - October 1902)
