= Marcella Cosgrave =

Nationalist

- Born: 30 April 1873; Dublin, Ireland
- Died: 31 January 1938 (aged 64); Dublin, Ireland
- Other name: Marsála Ní Coisghraighe

Marcella Cosgrave (30 April 1873 – 31 January 1938) was an Irish nationalist. She was a founder member of Inghinidhe na hÉireann and Cumann na mBan and took part in the 1916 Easter Rising and Irish War of Independence.

== Background ==
Cosgrave was born at 4 Georges Quay, Dublin, to Patrick Cosgrave, a sail maker, and Mary Whittaker. In 1901 she was living with her younger brother and older sister, Thomas and (Mary) Anne, in Georges Quay and keeping house for them. In 1911 Cosgrave, now a milliner, was living at Tara Street and filled out her census form in Irish.

== Political activity ==
Cosgrave was present at the founding of Inghinidhe na hÉireann on Easter Sunday, 15 April 1900.

When Inghinidhe was dissolved and merged into Cumann na mBan in 1914, Cosgrave joined the latter organisation, serving in its Inghinidhe branch until her death.

== 1916 involvement ==
Along with 23 other women, Cosgrave served in the Easter Rising in the Marrowbone Lane garrison, which was based in Jameson's Distillery, as Cumann na mBan quartermaster. The garrison had the responsibility to protect the rear of the South Dublin Union. As quartermaster, Cosgrave succeeded in obtaining a cow and her calves, which they milked to help feed the garrison.

Once the volunteers surrendered, Cosgrave was arrested and was initially taken to Richmond Barracks. From there they were transferred to Kilmainham Gaol. She was kept there for 10 days. She was released on 8 May 1916.

== After the Rising ==
Between the Rising and the War of Independence, many Inghinidhe branch members of Cumann na mBan were also involved in supporting the families of the men who remained in prison or had been killed. Cosgrave was a member of the Irish National Aid Association and Volunteer Dependents' Fund. Other Cumann na mBan activities included first aid and military training. They also collected money, initially for the dependants' fund and then later to enable the purchase of weapons for the Irish Republican Army.

She also served in the War of Independence but very little information exists about her activities. However, her medal for that war is in the Kilmainham Gaol collection.

Cosgrave died on 31 January 1938 at 3 Georges Street, Dublin. She is buried in Glasnevin cemetery.
