= Mary Ann Hutton =

- Born: Mary Ann Drummond; 1862; Manchester, England
- Died: 29 August 1953 (aged 90–91); Dublin, Ireland
- Resting place: Deans Grange Cemetery

Mary Ann or Margaret Hutton (née Drummond; 1862 – 29 August 1953) was an Irish language scholar and writer.

== Early life and family ==
Mary Ann Hutton was born Mary Ann Drummond in Manchester, England in 1862. She was the eldest child of James Drummond and Frances (née Classon). She had two brothers and five sisters. Some secondary sources refer to her as Margaret, but in official records Hutton appears as Mary Ann. Her father was a Unitarian minister, initially at Cross Street Chapel but then at Manchester New College, London from 1869. Both her father and mother were prominent figures in the Unitarian community and amongst Irish dissenters. Her paternal grandfather was the poet William Hamilton Drummond and her uncle was the botanist and physician, James Lawson Drummond. Her father was an advocate for female suffrage. Hutton was well educated, and was one of the first women to attend the University of London, going on to be awarded the Hermann silver medal in German in 1882 and a Fielden scholarship. She married Arthur Hutton in Hampstead, London on 27 March 1890. He came from a prominent Unitarian family of Dublin coach-builders. He established a coach builders in Chichester Street, Belfast in 1886. The couple lived in Deramore Park, Belfast, with their one daughter, Margaret Bruce Hutton, born on 3 November 1893. Her husband, Arthur, died on 10 July 1908.

== Irish language activism ==
It was at the Hutton's home in Belfast that Patrick Pearse stayed when he visited Belfast in December 1904. Hutton had known Pearse for a number of years through the Gaelic League, and had stayed in Rosmuc, County Galway at Pearse's cottage to improve her fluency in Irish. It is not known exactly when Hutton became interested in Irish, but she was corresponding with the Celticist Kuno Meyer by 1901 and is marked as an Irish speaker in the 1901 census. She spent time in the Irish speaking community in Glens of Antrim with her friend Rose Maud Young. Hutton was also involved in the establishment of the 1904 Feis na nGleann. She wrote for An Claidheamh Soluis at the request of Pearse, and is thought to have lectured on Middle Irish in Coláiste Naomh Comhghaill and Ard Sgoil Uladh in Belfast. Hutton delivered the Margaret Stokes Memorial Lectures in Alexandra College in 1908, speaking on other worldly visions in early Irish literature.

Hutton gave £50 to the fund to establish Pearse's school, St. Enda's, and lent Pearse a further £100 in 1911 when the school was struggling financially. Hutton was widowed in 1908, and having moved to Dublin, living at 17 Appian Way. Around this time she decided to convert to Catholicism. She lived in Dublin for the rest of her life, supporting Conradh na Gaeilge and was heavily involved in the city's cultural activities. In 1937 she was the representative of the Royal Dublin Society at the Celtic Congress in Edinburgh.

Hutton's largest contribution of Irish scholarship was her 1907 edition of the Táin Bó Cúailnge legend, The Táin: an Irish epic told in English verse, with scholarly appendices of lexical names and terms. This is a re-working of the legend using numerous sources rather than a literal translation, and took 10 years to complete. The work was well received, going on to be re-published in 1924 with Celtic revival style illustrations by John Patrick Campbell as Seaghan MacCathmhaoil.

Eoin MacNeill, Douglas Hyde and Louis Claude Purser supported an unsuccessful proposal in 1910 that Hutton be elected to the membership of the Royal Irish Academy. This was the first time that a woman had been nominated. In 1914 she was appointed to the senate of Queen's University Belfast, and in 1933 was awarded an honorary degree of D.Litt. by the National University of Ireland.

== Death ==
Hutton died at her home at 30 William's Place Upper, Dublin on 29 August 1953. She is buried in Deans Grange Cemetery. The National Library of Ireland holds some of her correspondence. Hutton was one of the women that were the subject of the BBC Two Northern Ireland programme, Mná na nGlinntí (Women of the Glens).
