= Herbert Hughes (composer) =

Irish composer (1908–1987)

Herbert Hughes (16 May 1882 – 1 May 1937) was an Irish composer, music critic and a collector and arranger of Irish folksongs. He was the father of Spike Hughes.

== Biography ==
Hughes was born and brought up in Belfast, Ireland, but completed his formal music education at the Royal College of Music, London, where he studied with Charles Villiers Stanford and Charles Wood, graduating in 1901. Subsequently, he worked as a music critic, notably for The Daily Telegraph from 1911 to 1932.

Described as having an "ardent and self-confident manner", Hughes is first heard of in an Irish musical capacity (beyond being honorary organist at St Peter's Church on Antrim Road at the age of fourteen) collecting traditional airs and transcribing folksongs in North Donegal in August 1903 with his brother Fred, F.J. Bigger, and John Campbell. Dedicated to seeking out and recording such ancient melodies as were yet to be found in the more remote glens and valleys of Ulster, he produced Songs of Uladh (1904) with Joseph Campbell, illustrated by his brother John and paid for by Bigger. Throughout his career, he collected and arranged hundreds of traditional melodies and published many of them in his own unique arrangements. Three of his best-known works are the celebrated songs, My Lagan Love, She Moved Through the Fair, and Down by the Salley Gardens, which were published as part of his four collections of Irish Country Songs, his key achievement. These were written in collaborations with the poets Joseph Campbell and Padraic Colum, and Yeats himself. A dispute with Hamilton Harty over copyright on My Lagan Love was pursued on Bigger's advice, but failed.

Married to Lillian Florence (known as Meena) Meacham, Herbert had a son, the musician and author Patrick Cairns, known professionally as Spike Hughes. In 1922 he married his second wife Suzanne McKernan, a member of the Irish Players, and there were two daughters, Angela and Helena. Angela wrote the memoir Chelsea Footprints in 2008. Helena is an actress who appeared in the first production of Look Back in Anger. Herbert died in Brighton, England, at the relatively early age of fifty-four.

== Music ==
Hughes had a unique approach to arranging Irish traditional music. He called upon the influence of the French impressionist Claude Debussy in his approach to harmony: "Musical art is gradually releasing itself from the tyranny of the tempered scale. […] and if we examine the work of the modern French school, notably that of M. Claude Debussy, it will be seen that the tendency is to break the bonds of this old slave-driver and return to the freedom of primitive scales." He regarded arrangements as an independent art form on an equal level with original composition: "[…] under his [i.e. the arranger's] hands it is definitively transmuted into an art-song, an art-song of its own generation.". Hughes's folksong arrangements have been sung all across the English-speaking world; John McCormack and Kathleen Ferrier were the first to record them on gramophone records.

An admirer of James Joyce's poetry, Hughes in 1933 edited The Joyce-Book, a volume of settings of Joyce's poetry, with 13 pieces by 13 composers including, besides Hughes himself, Arnold Bax, Arthur Bliss, Herbert Howells, John Ireland, and non-British composers such as George Antheil, Edgardo Carducci-Agustini, and Albert Roussel. The large-format, blue-cloth covered volume has since become a collector's item.

Hughes also composed a limited amount of original chamber music (a violin sonata is mentioned in a letter to Hughes from Bernard van Dieren dated 4 April 1932), and some scores for the stage (like And So to Bed by John Bernard Fagan) and film. Hughes and John Robert Monsell also created songs for a musical version of Richard Brinsley Sheridan's The Rivals called Rivals!, which was staged at the Kingsway Theatre in London in October 1935 by Vladimir Rosing and ran for 86 performances.

== Selected works ==
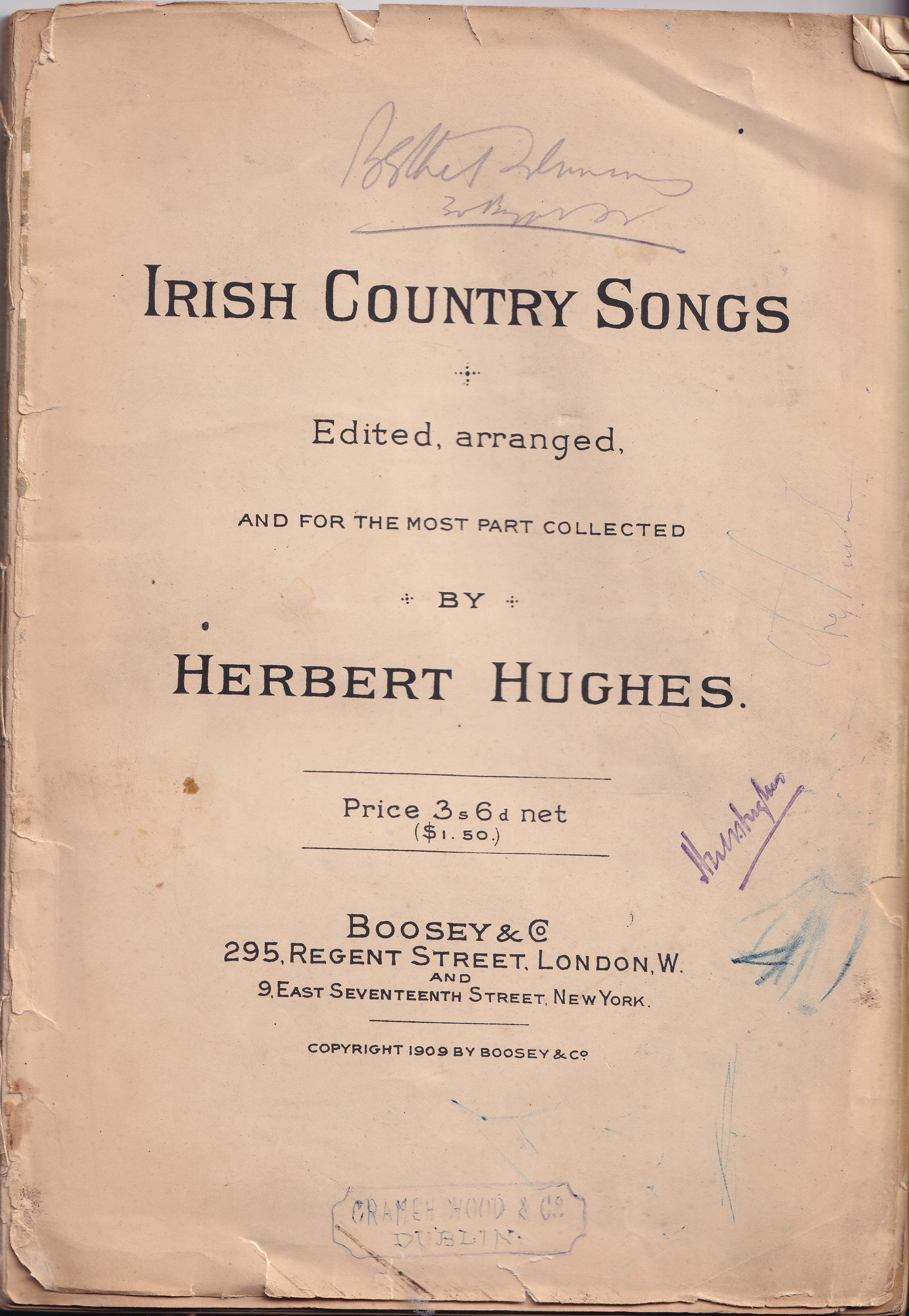
Front cover of Irish Country Songs (1909) by Herbert Hughes (signed by author)

=== Folksong arrangements ===
- Songs of Uladh (Belfast, 1904)
- Irish Country Songs, four volumes (London, 1909, 1915, 1934, 1936)
- Historical Songs and Ballads of Ireland (London, 1922)
- Old Irish Melodies (London, 1931)

=== Original compositions ===
Vocal

- She Weeps over Rahoon (James Joyce) for voice and piano (London, 1933, in The Joyce-Book)
- choral works such as Two Old Testament Spirituals, Boreens of Derry, Christmas Time, Doctor Foster

Instrumental

- Three Impressions for Wind Quintet (n.d.)
- Three Moods for Brass Quartet (n.d.)

== Selected recordings ==
- The Last Rose of Summer. Best Loved Songs of Ireland, performed by Ann Murray (mezzo) and Graham Johnson (piano), on: Hyperion CDA 66627 (1993); re-issued as CDH 55210 (2005). Contains: The Leprehaun; I Have a Bonnet Trimmed with Blue; A Young Maid Stood in her Father's Garden; The Next Market Day; The Bard of Armagh; Monday, Tuesday; The Stuttering Lovers; I Will Walk with my Love; The Cork Leg, besides song arrangements by John A. Stevenson, Charles V. Stanford, Benjamin Britten, etc.
- A Purse of Gold. Irish Songs by Herbert Hughes, performed by Ailish Tynan (soprano) and Iain Burnside (piano), on: Signum Classics SIG CD 106 (2007). Contains: Reynardine; The Fanaid Grove; The Leprehaun; When through Life unblest we Rove; Oh, Breath not his Name; I'm a Decent Good Irish Body; She Weeps over Rahoon; The Magpie's Nest; Johnny Doyle; Cruckhaun Finn; Johnny I Hardly Knew Ye; The Gartan Mother's Lullaby; You Couldn't Stop a Lover; I Will Walk with my Love; She Moved thro' the Fair; The Bard of Armagh; The Old Turf Fire; O Father, Father, Build me a Boat; B for Blarney; She Lived beside the Anner; The Stuttering Lovers; I Know where I'm Goin'; A Young Maid Stood in her Father's Garden; The Spanish Lady; Tigaree torum orum.
- The Leprechaun, with Frederica von Stade (mezzo-soprano) and Martin Katz (piano), CBS, 1982

== Bibliography ==
- David Byers: "Herbert Hughes – A Centenary Note", in: Soundpost 2 (1982) March-issue, p. 6.
- Axel Klein: Die Musik Irlands im 20. Jahrhundert (Hildesheim: Georg Olms Verlag, 1996), ISBN 3-487-10196-3.
