= Inghinidhe na hÉireann =

Irish nationalist women's organisation (1900–1914)

- Daughters of Ireland
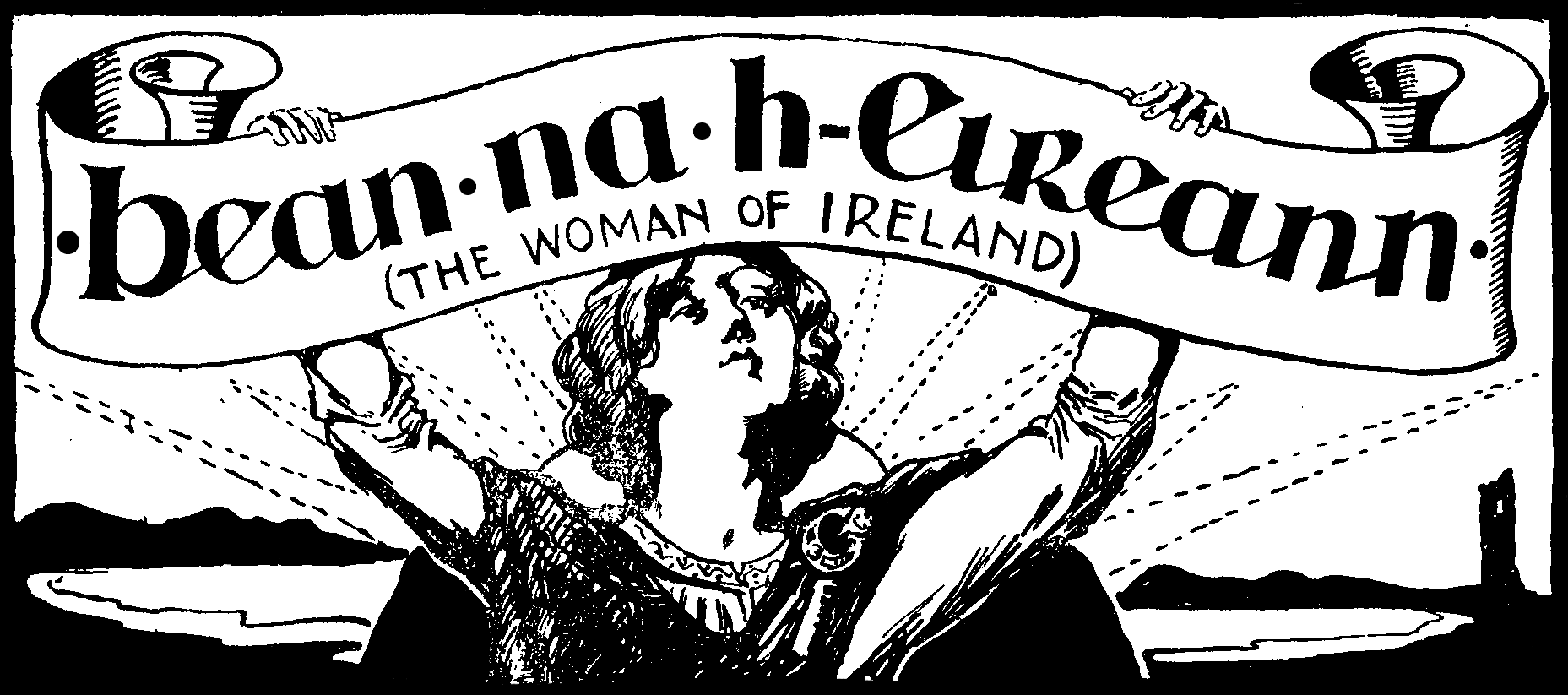
- Masthead of Bean na h-Éireann (The Woman of Ireland), the organisations' newspaper
- Merged into: Cumann na mBan
- Formation: 1900
- Dissolved: 1914
- President: Maud Gonne
- Vice-Presidents: Alice Furlong; Jennie Wyse Power; Annie Egan; Anna Johnston (Ethna Carbery)

Inghinidhe na hÉireann (Irish: [ˈɪnʲiːnʲiː n̪ˠə ˈheːɾʲən̪ˠ]; "Daughters of Ireland") was a radical Irish nationalist women's organisation led and founded by Maud Gonne from 1900 to 1914, when it merged with the new Cumann na mBan (The Irishwomen's Council).

== Patriotic Children's Treat ==
The Inghinidhe originated from a meeting of 15 women in the Celtic Literary Society Rooms in Dublin on Easter Sunday 1900 (April 15th). While the meeting's original purpose was to provide a gift for Arthur Griffith for defending Maud Gonne from an accusation that she was a British spy, it turned to planning a "Patriotic Children's Treat" in response to the Children's Treat in the Phoenix Park which had been part of Queen Victoria's April visit to Dublin. One aim of the royal visit was to encourage Irishmen to enlist in the British Army to fight in the Boer War, whereas Griffith, Gonne and others were sympathetic to the Boers. Over fifty women joined the organising committee for the Patriotic Children's Treat, which took place in July on the Sunday after the Wolfe Tone Commemoration. It involved 30,000 children parading from Beresford Place to Clonturk Park, followed by a picnic and anti-recruitment speeches. The funds left over after the Patriotic Children's Treat were used to establish Inghinidhe na hÉireann as a permanent organisation.

== Members ==
Most founders were middle-class Catholics, though Helena Molony wrote in its magazine, Bean na hÉireann (Woman of Ireland), "Now there were some young girls in Dublin, chiefly members of the Irish classes of Celtic Literary Society… They were (with one exception) all working girls.They had not much gold and silver to give to Ireland. Only willing hearts, earnestness and determination." They originally met on Easter Sunday after noon Mass, she wrote, with the intention of presenting an inscribed blackthorn stick to (an unnamed) Arthur Griffith, who had thrashed a newspaper editor for maligning Maud Gonne. They went on to plan a picnic for 30,000 children as an alternative to the planned celebrations of a recruiting visit of the British monarch to Ireland. As they had no money, they raised subscriptions all over Dublin, coming together in an association named Daughters of Ireland, or (in deliberately antiquated spelling) Inghinidhe na h-Éireann.

Maud Gonne was elected President of the association; Vice-Presidents were Alice Furlong, Jennie Wyse Power, Annie Egan, and Anna Johnston (Ethna Carbery). Among the founders were Helena Molony, Sinéad O'Flanagan (later wife of Éamon de Valera), actors Maire Quinn and Molly and Sara Allgood, physician Kathleen Lynn and Mary Macken, a leading member of the Catholic Women's Suffrage League. Later members included Mary MacSwiney, Máire Nic Shiubhlaigh, Constance Markievicz, Margaret Buckley, Ella Young, Máire Gill, writer Rosamond Jacob, Hanna Sheehy, Alice Milligan, and Marcella Cosgrave as well as many working-class women.

== Work ==
The Inghinidhe's objects were defined as follows:

- The re-establishment of the complete independence of Ireland
- To encourage the study of Gaelic, of Irish literature, history, music and art, especially among the young, by the organising and teaching of classes for the above subjects.
- To support and popularise Irish manufactures.
- To discourage the reading and circulation of low English literature, the singing of English songs, the attending of vulgar English entertainments at theatres and music halls, and to combat in every way English influence, which is doing so much injury to the artistic taste and refinement of the Irish people.
- To form a fund called the National Purposes Fund for the furtherance of the above objects.

They sponsored classes and entertainment for children and adults, and protested at the British army recruitment centre in O'Connell Street.

The Inghinidhe performed tableaux vivants on themes from Irish mythology and world history. It also produced Irish plays with male actors recruited from other nationalist groups.

In 1908, the Inghinidhe launched a monthly magazine, Bean na hÉireann, which was edited by Helena Molony. Among the contributors were Patrick Pearse, Thomas MacDonagh, Sidney Gifford (under her nom de plume John Brennan), Maud Gonne, Constance Markievicz, who wrote the gardening column and Molony herself who wrote the Labour Notes. There were articles on politics, the vote for women, nationalism, language – and regular columns on labour issues, fashion (stressing Irish-made clothes), gardening, articles in Irish in the cló Ghaelach (as Irish was always then written and printed), a children's section with competitions, etc. It was popular with both men and women.

== Superseding ==
In 1914, Inghinidhe na hÉireann was absorbed into Cumann na mBan, the women's arm of the Irish Volunteers. However, some trade unionist members opted instead to join the Irish Citizen Army.

== Bibliography ==
- Coxhead, Elizabeth, Daughters of Erin (Gerrard's Cross 1985)
- Fox, R.M, Rebel Irishwomen (Dublin 1935)
- Fox, R.M, How Women Helped', in Dublin's Fighting Story 1916–1921, Told by Men who Made it, Tralee, the Kerryman undated.
- Hayes, Alan (ed.) The Years Flew By, Recollections of Madame Sidney Gifford Czira, (Galway 2000)
- Markiewicz, Countess Constance, Women, Ideals and the Nation (Dublin 1909)
- Mulholland, Maria, The Politics and Relationships of Kathleen Lynn (Dublin 2002)
- Trotter, Mary (2001). "Women's Work and the Irish Nationalist Actress; Inghinidhe na hEireann". Ireland's National Theaters: Political Performance and the Origins of the Irish Dramatic Movement. Syracuse University Press. pp. 73–100. ISBN 9780815628880.
- "Maud Gonne MacBride and Inghinidhe na hÉireann" (PDF). The 1916 Rising: Personalities and Perspectives. National Library of Ireland. p. §3.2.3. Archived from the original (PDF) on 27 June 2013.
