= Margaret Pender =

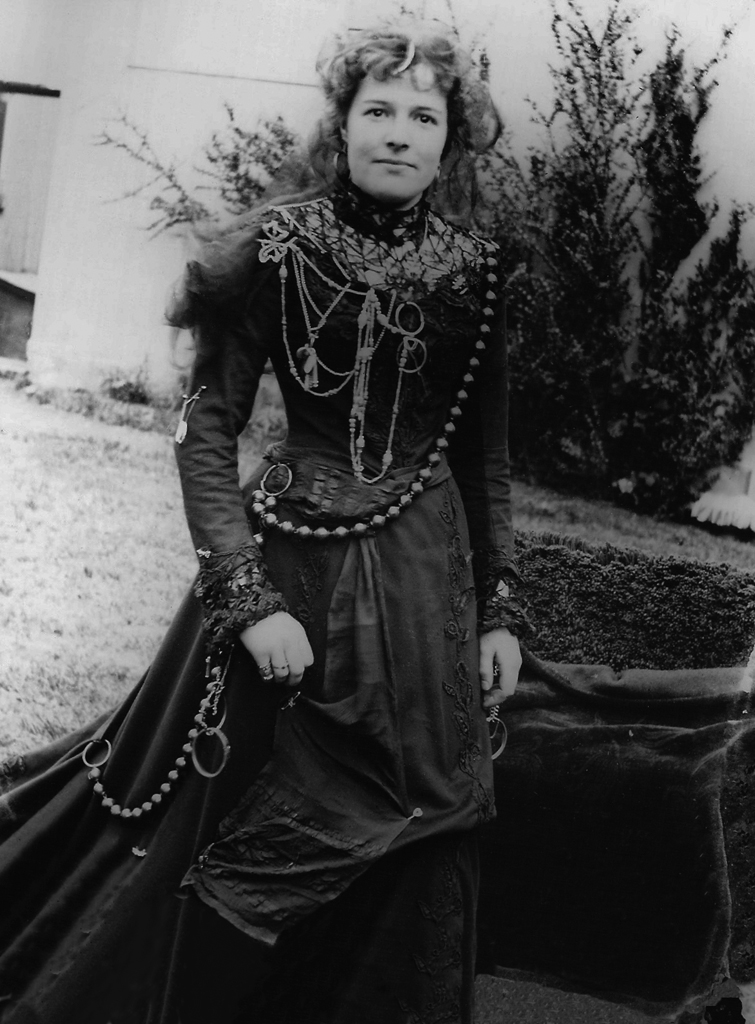
- Born: Margaret Teresa Doherty; 1848; Ballytweedy, County Antrim
- Died: 17 March 1920 (aged 71–72); Belfast
- Known for: Irish nationalist writing

Margaret Pender (1848 – 17 March 1920) was a Belfast-based Irish writer whose fiction and poetry appeared regularly in the nationalist press.

== Early life ==
Margaret Pender was born Margaret Teresa Doherty in 1848 or 1850 in the townland of Ballytweedy, near Templepatrick in County Antrim. Her parents were farmer, Daniel, and Margaret Doherty (née White). Her father was from a poor Catholic background, and her mother was a wealthier Presbyterian who disowned her after her marriage. She was the youngest daughter of the couple's 7 children. There was a literary and nationalist tradition in the family, her maternal grandfather, William White, and her mother were poets. Pender started to write verse from a young age. Pender was educated at home, as well as attending Ballyrobin national school and Convent of Mercy, Belfast. She trained to be a teacher, and taught for a short time in Aghagallon. She married Hugh Owen Pender, a printer, in 1869 and moved to Belfast.

== Writing ==
She was published in the Shamrock, the Belfast Morning News, The Shan van Vocht, The Nation and United Ireland, winning a number of poetry competitions. She wrote under the pseudonyms "Marguerite", "Colleen", and "M.T.P.". She also wrote serialised novels and short stories which usually had Irish nationalistic tones, that were published in Irish, American, and Australian press. Pender supported nationalist politics in her writing but also in activism. She was a prominent supporter of Joseph Devlin, and was elected president of the Belfast branch of the Irish Women's Association, succeeding Alice Milligan. She gave lectures to both Young Ireland and the Irish Women's Association, with her name "sufficient to bring a large audience together."

In 1916, her novel O’Neill of the Glen was the source material for the first indigenous Irish film, O’Neil of the Glen (1916). The film was the first work of the Film Company of Ireland, and was adapted for the screen by W. T. Lysaght. No prints survive of the film, but reviews note the film adaptation remained very close to Pender's novel.

== Death and legacy ==
Pender died at her home 7 Newington Street, Belfast, on 17 March 1920. She had three daughter and two sons, with one son, Justin (1870–1906), also a published poet. A portion of her letters are held in the British Library. Raidió Teilifís Éireann aired a radio adaptation of her Green Cockade in Irish as An Cnota Glas.

== Selected works ==
- O’Neill of the Glen (1891)
- Some Men and Episodes of ’98 (1897)
- Green Cockade: A Tale of Ulster in Ninety Eight (1898)
