= Joseph Warwick Bigger =

Irish politician and academic (1891–1951)

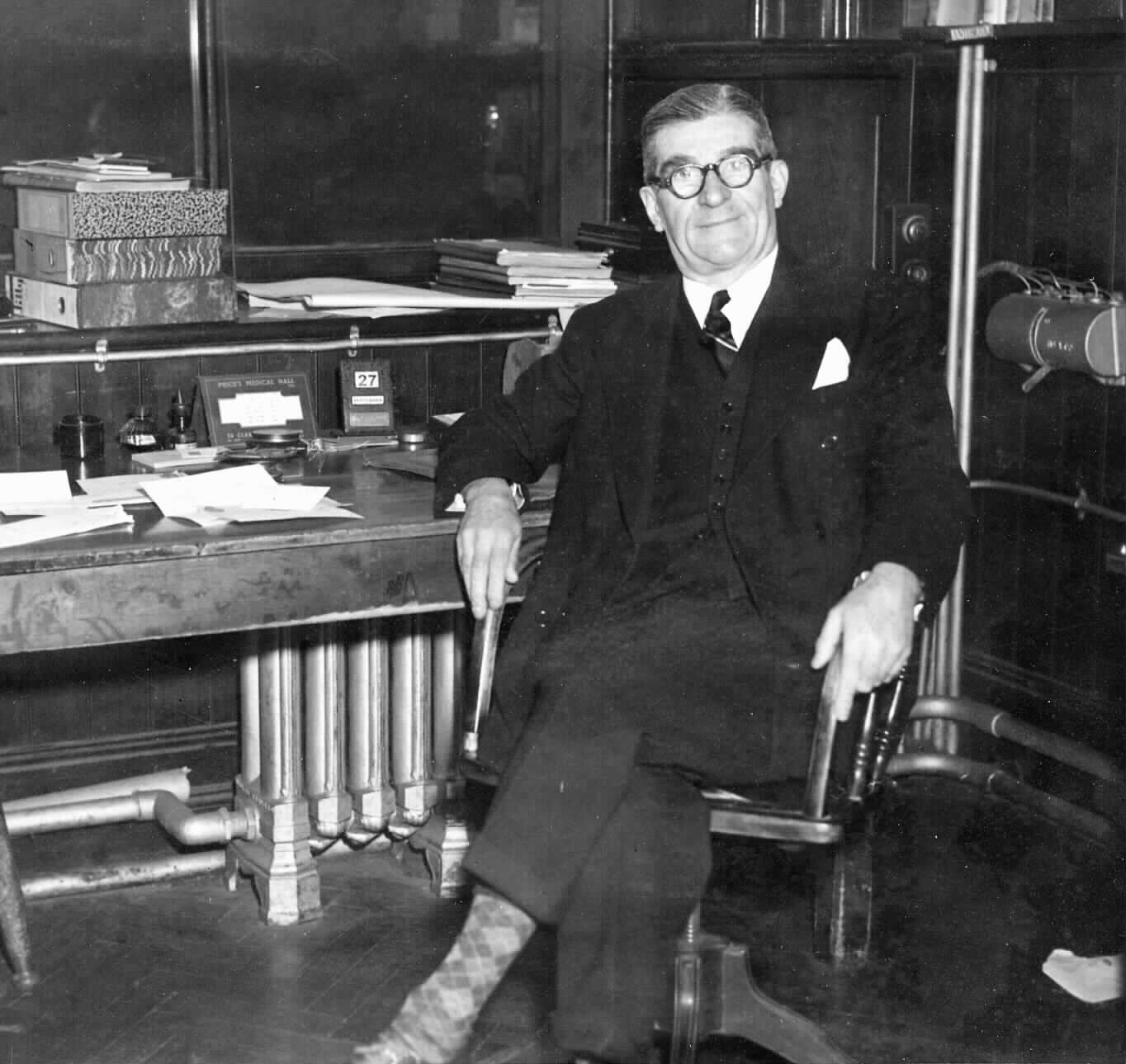
- Bigger at Trinity College, c. 1946

Senator
- In office 22 November 1947 – 17 August 1951
- Constituency: Dublin University

Personal details
- Born: 11 September 1891 Belfast, Ireland
- Died: 17 August 1951 (aged 59) County Dublin, Ireland
- Party: Independent
- Spouse: Patricia Curtin (m. 1916)
- Children: 2
- Parent: Edward Coey Bigger (father)
- Education: Trinity College Dublin
- Occupation: Politician, Academic

Joseph Warwick Bigger (11 September 1891 – 17 August 1951) was an Irish politician and academic. He was an independent member of Seanad Éireann from 1947 to 1951.

Bigger was born on 11 September 1891 in Belfast, Ireland. His parents were Sir Edward Coey Bigger and Maude Coulter Warwick. In 1900, his family moved to Dublin due to appointment of his father as medical inspector under the Local Government Board of Ireland. He attended Presbyterian College in North Carolina and later, Trinity College Dublin. Soon after his graduation from the Trinity College, he was appointed as a demonstrator in pathology and bacteriology at Sheffield University in South Yorkshire, England. However, in 1919 he returned to Dublin and became pathologist and medical inspector under the Local Government Board and the professor of forensic and preventive medicine at the Royal College of Surgeons in 1920. He served as the professor of preventive medicine and bacteriology at Trinity College from 1924 to 1950. In 1936, Bigger was appointed dean of the medical school at Trinity College where he served until 1939. In 1950 he was elected an honorary fellow of Trinity College Dublin.

He was first elected to the Seanad at a by-election on 22 November 1947 by the Dublin University constituency. The vacancy was caused by the appointment of T. C. Kingsmill Moore as a judge of the High Court. He was re-elected at the 1948 election. He did not contest the 1951 election.

It was in trying to replicate research carried out by Bigger at Trinity College Dublin that the Scottish scientist Alexander Fleming accidentally discovered penicillin.

He is credited with being the first to report the phenomenon of bacterial antibiotic persistence.

He married Patricia Mai Curtin in 1916; and they had one son and one daughter. Bigger died on 17 August 1951, aged 59.

== Bibliography ==
- 1935 – Handbook of bacteriology for students and practitioners of medicine
- 1941 – Man Against Microbe
