= John Patrick Campbell =

- Born: 1883
- Died: 1962 (aged 78–79)
- Other names: Seaghan MacCathmhaoil
- Occupation: Artist

John Patrick Campbell (1883–1962) was a Belfast-born artist known for his illustrations in publications by members of the Gaelic League published under the name Seaghan MacCathmhaoil. (Note: In some works, such as Mary Ann Hutton's The Táin, rendered as Seagan macCathamoil.) He was also involved in theatre and related productions. He emigrated to the United States in the early 1910s, and directed the 1913 "Irish Historic Pageant" in New York. His work as a published illustrator or artist seems to have ended by the 1920s.

== Biography ==
John Campbell was born in Belfast on 7 March 1883 one of ten children of William and Catherine. He trained at the Belfast School of Art. Their family were Catholic and Nationalist, and their father a Parnellite, whilst their mother was of a Presbyterian background.

His skill was recognised early on and in 1904 whilst still at the School of Art sent one of his works to the 1904 St. Louis World's Fair. Together with his brother Joseph Campbell he was involved in the production of the first Festival of the Glens (Glen Feis) in 1904 under Francis Joseph Bigger.

His early published works included illustrations for authors of the Gaelic League, including a series for Mary A. Hutton's translation of The Táin (1924), made c.1907. He also illustrated for a number of Irish nationalist journals including Bulmer Hobson's The Republic, as well as cultural journals. He also illustrated his brother Joseph Campbell's folk poetry, in The Rushlight, under the pseudonym 'Ceann-Maor' (Big Head).

His work was influenced by Art Nouveau, Art Deco, and Celtic art styles, whilst also being similar in style to that produced by traditional wood engraving.

In 1911/2 he emigrated to the United States of America, continuing to illustrate. In America he also became known for his work with the Irish Theatre of America, as well as for directing the 1913 "Irish Historic Pageant", a large scale production held at the 69th Regiment Armory in New York.

After around 1927 his career in the arts and illustration seems to have ended, with no recorded works. He died 19 August 1962.

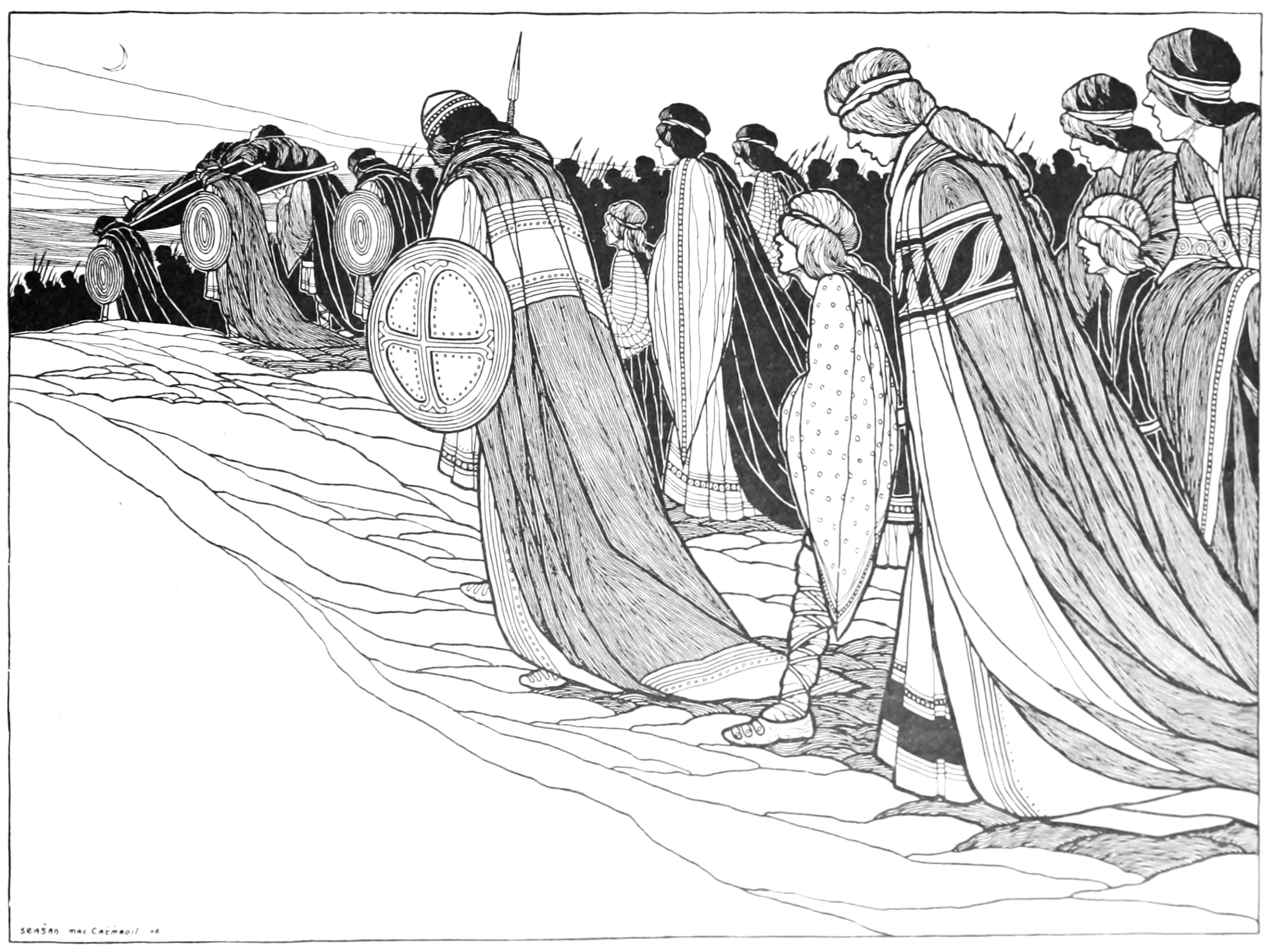
John P. Campbell, The Connacht Caoine, 1909, reproduced in The International Studio.

== See also ==
- Joseph Campbell (poet), his brother
