= Ethna Carbery =

Irish writer, journalist, and poet

Anna Johnston McManus (pseud. Ethna Carbery)
- Born: Anna Bella Johnston; 3 December 1864; Ballymena, County Antrim, Ireland
- Died: 2 April 1902 (aged 37); Donegal, Ireland
- Occupation: Journalist
- Spouse: Seumas MacManus (m. 1901)
- Writing career
- Language: English
- Period: Victorian era
- Notable works: The Four Winds of Eirinn, In the Celtic Past
- Movement: Irish Literary Revival

Ethna Carbery, born Anna Bella Johnston, (3 December 1864 – 2 April 1902) was an Irish journalist, writer and poet. She is best known for writing the poem and song "Roddy McCorley", and the "Song of Ciabhán"; the latter was set to music by Ivor Gurney. In Belfast in the late 1890s, with Alice Milligan she produced The Shan Van Vocht, a nationalist monthly of literature, history and comment that gained a wide circulation in Ireland and in the Irish diaspora. Her poetry was collected and published after her death under the pen name Ethna Carbery, adopted following her marriage to the poet Seumas MacManus in 1901.

== Life ==
She was born Anna Bella Johnston on 3 December 1864 in the townland of Kirkinriola, Ballymena, County Antrim, the daughter of Robert Johnston, a timber merchant and a leading member of the Irish Republican Brotherhood, and Marjorie (Mage) Magee, who came from County Donegal.

Born in 1839 her father had grown up hearing stories from the last veteran United Irishmen who had fought at the Battle of Antrim and personally knew a number of Young Irelanders from the 1840s before himself becoming involved in the 1867 Fenian Rising. He later oversaw the re-organisation of the IRB in the 1880s and had hosted many of the future readers of the Easter Rising in his Antrim Road home in Belfast. Carbery's husband, the poet and folklorist Seumus MacManus, called Robert Johnston the "…connecting link that kept the spirit of freedom alive throughout more than a century."

From the age of fifteen, when she had her first piece published, Carbery contributed poems and short stories to a number of Irish periodicals, including United Ireland, Young Ireland, the Nation and the Catholic Fireside.

She participated in the nationalist commemorations of the 1798 Rising and with Alice Milligan, Maud Gonne and others toured the country delivering lectures on the United Irishmen. In 1900 she was a founder-member of Inghinidhe na hÉireann, the revolutionary women's organisation led by Maud Gonne. She was elected a vice-president of the association, along with Jennie Wyse Power, Annie Egan and Alice Furlong. She and Milligan wrote and produced plays as part of its cultural activities.

In October 1895, with Alice Milligan, she produced the Northern Patriot, the journal of the commemorative Henry Joy McCracken Literary Society. But after just four issues, she was dismissed. The sponsors were wary of an association with her father, an active "Fenian". Milligan resigned in solidarity and, working out of the offices of Robert-Johnston's timber yard, they launched their own independent monthly The Shan Van Vocht, producing forty issues. Leading literary revivalist Padraic Colum attributed its comparative success to "a freshness that came from its femininity". Carbery (still Johnston) and Milligan were joined as prominent contributors by Alice Furlong, Katherine Tynan, Margaret Pender and Nora Hopper. The first issue, January 1896, gave an early platform to socialist republican James Connolly.

On 22 August 1901 she married Seumas MacManus (1867–1960), a contributor and moved with him to Revlin House, just outside Donegal Town in County Donegal in the west of Ulster. It was then that she began writing under the pen name of Ethna Carbery because once she took the last name of MacManus she didn't want to be confused with her husband (also a writer).

Carbery died in Revlin House of gastritis on 2 April 1902, aged 37. Her husband, who was three years her junior, outlived her by 58 years. Although MacManus and Johnston were only married for one year her impact on his life ran deep.

Her poetry was published by her husband after her death in The Four Winds of Eirinn, which was phenomenally successful over the next few years. Some further volumes followed. He also wrote a memoir dedicated to her.

At the fiftieth anniversary of her death, a public address was given by Sinead de Valera in which she stated that "Among women poets Ethna Carbery would always hold the foremost place and, even though her life was short, it was full of devotion and idealism" (Irish Press 2/4/1952).

== Family ==
The artist John Patrick Campbell and the poet Joseph Campbell were her cousins.

== Works ==
- The Four Winds of Eirinn (1902) - poems
- The Passionate Hearts (1903) - stories
- In the Celtic Past (1904) - hero tales
- We Sang for Ireland: Poems of Ethna Carbery, Séamus MacManus, Alice Milligan (1950) - poetry
- The Love-Talker - poetry
- Death of Sweet Roses - poetry

== See also ==
- List of Irish writers
