= J. R. Monsell =

John Robert Monsell (15 August 1877 – 20 March 1952) was an Irish illustrator.

Monsell was born at Cahirciveen, County Kerry, to a wealthy Anglo-Irish family. His father, William Thomas Monsell (1843–1887), was a magistrate and inspector of facturers; his wife, Elinor Vere, was daughter of Hon. Robert O'Brien, of Old Church, Limerick (son of Sir Edward O'Brien, 4th Baronet). William Thomas Monsell's father, Rev. John Samuel Bewley Monsell (1811–1875), vicar of Egham, Surrey, was first cousin to William Monsell, 1st Baron Emly; William Thomas served as Lord Emly's private secretary during his time as Postmaster General.

Monsell's great uncles were Sir Aubrey de Vere and Sir Stephen de Vere. In 1902 the family moved to Chelsea.

He served as a lieutenant in the 12th Battalion (The Rangers), London Regiment of the British Army during the First World War, having trained with the Inns of Court Officers' Training Corps; he married the novelist Margaret Irwin in 1927.

Monsell's edition of The Rose and the Ring by William Makepeace Thackeray was largely successful. His sister Elinor Monsell, married to Bernard Darwin, was also an illustrator.
