= Pleasure Gardens Theatre =

Historic theatre in Folkestone

Coordinates: 51.077°N 1.170°E

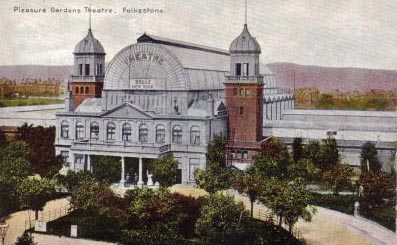
A view of the theatre in 1907

The Pleasure Gardens Theatre was a theatre in Folkestone in Kent. It was opened in 1886 in a building that had previously been constructed as an Exhibition Hall in 1851. It was later converted into a cinema before closing in 1964.

In the interwar years several plays premiered there prior to West End runs including Dorothy Brandon's 1923 play The Outsider. The following year Sutton Vane's Falling Leaves was first staged at Folkestone.

== Bibliography ==
- Wearing, J. P. The London Stage 1920-1929: A Calendar of Productions, Performers, and Personnel. Rowman & Littlefield, 2014.
