= Sutton Vane =

British playwright

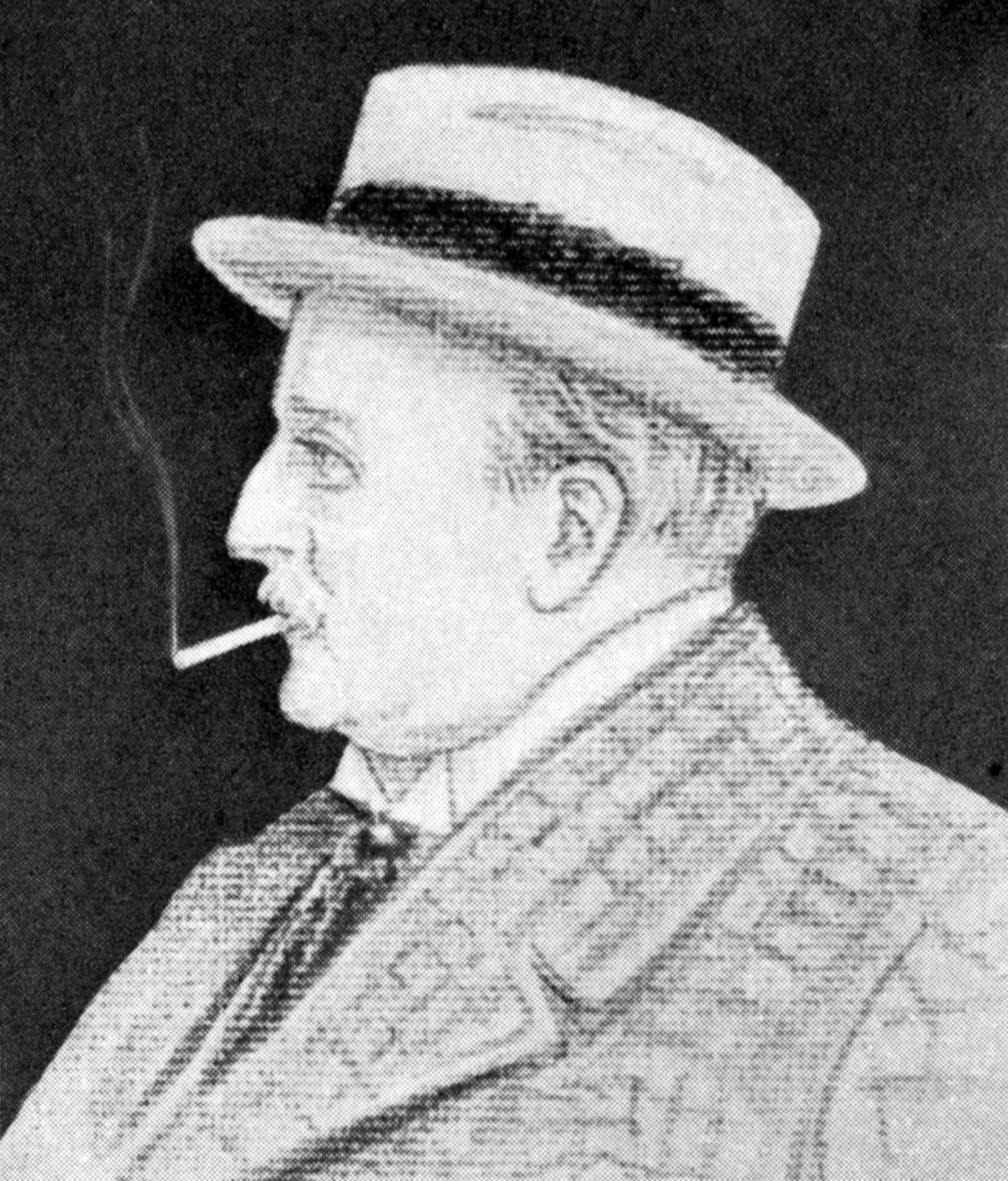
Illustration of Sutton Vane in the April 1924 issue of Theatre Magazine

Sutton Vane (born Vane Hunt Sutton-Vane; 9 November 1888 – 15 June 1963) was a British playwright best known work for Outward Bound (1923), which was filmed twice and was still being performed eight decades after its premiere.

== Actor ==
Born Vane Hunt Sutton-Vane in England in 1888, he was the eldest son of author and playwright Frank Sutton-Vane (1847–1913), who published as Sutton Vane. The author of plays including The Cotton King and The Span of Life, which were adapted for film in the teens, Sutton Vane and his son were sometimes confused in the public mind at the outset of the younger Sutton Vane's career.

Sutton Vane the younger started out professionally as an actor, and might have made his mark in that field if not for the outbreak of the First World War. He joined the British army in 1914, at age 26, and served until he was invalided out due to malaria and shell-shock. Vane was haunted by guilt over this event, and once he sufficiently recovered, he returned to the combat area as a civilian, appearing for the entertainment of troops near the front lines during the later phase of the war—he made a particular impression in performances of Bayard Veiller's 1916 hit The Thirteenth Chair, which he did on many stages with artillery bursting well within earshot. None of this would have been terribly important, but for the seriousness which the experience—of living on what felt like the edge of eternity—imparted to the young actor.

== Playwright ==
After the Armistice, Vane turned to writing plays, and authored two conventional works that caused little stir. Then came Outward Bound, which was so unusual in its subject matter as a fantasy-drama that no producer would go near it. Instead, Vane produced it himself, renting a theatre in London, painting his own backdrops, building his own sets, and bringing together a company of actors, all for a reported total of $600. Outward Bound is about a small, motley group of eight passengers who meet in the lounge of an ocean liner at sea and realize that they have no idea why they are there, or where they are bound. Each of them eventually discovers that they are dead, and that they're about to face judgment from an Examiner about whether they are to go to Heaven or Hell. In post-World War I England, with its reflective, pacifist mood—many hundreds of thousands of families were still mourning the loss of loved ones, and the nation collectively mourned the decimation of a generation of students, artists, writers, and musicians—the play struck a responsive chord and was an immediate success. Outward Bound was moved to a large theatre in London and became the biggest hit of the 1923 season.

The play came to Broadway in 1924, where it was a similarly huge success in a production starring Alfred Lunt, Leslie Howard, Margalo Gillmore, Beryl Mercer, and Dudley Digges (as the Examiner). Critics were taken with the play's mix of serious drama and fantasy, interspersed with moments of comedy, and it seemed to hold audiences spellbound—at the time, America was nursing its own psychic wounds coming out of the First World War, and the play seemed to allow a surprisingly wide swathe of people to address issues in their lives. Outward Bound was the kind of work that, once seen, provoked endless discussion and arguments about its meaning, all of which translated into irresistible word-of-mouth for the production for many months after the rave reviews.

The play was revived in London during 1928, and made into a 1930 film in Hollywood by Warner Bros. under director Robert Milton, with Howard playing Lunt's stage role this time instead of the one he created onstage, Mercer and Digges repeating their Broadway roles, and Douglas Fairbanks, Jr., Helen Chandler — who would appear in the 1938 Broadway revival — Montagu Love, and Alison Skipworth in the cast; the movie set Leslie Howard on the path to screen stardom. Outward Bound was the most popular play of its kind, in an era filled with philosophical fantasy works for the stage and screen, including Death Takes a Holiday (which was filmed in 1934, and subsequently remade as Meet Joe Black); and The Scoundrel; in the years preceding the Great Depression, the play seemed to define the zeitgeist of the period, and it endured in popularity right up through the advent of World War II. Warner Bros. made a partly successful attempt at updating the play to the Second World War in the form of Between Two Worlds (1944), directed by Edward A. Blatt and starring John Garfield, Eleanor Parker, and Sydney Greenstreet (as the Examiner).

None of Vane's other works, including Time Gentlemen, Please!, Marine Parade, Falling Leaves, Overture, and Man Overboard, ever found the popularity of Outward Bound. This play remained popular with college theatre groups into the 1960s, well past Vane's death in Hastings in 1963 at age 75, and thanks to television showings of Between Two Worlds, it remained out there in some form before the general public. Outward Bound also served as the unofficial inspiration for the made-for-TV movie Haunts of the Very Rich (1972), directed by Paul Wendkos, and it was still being revived by professional regional theatre companies throughout the 1990s and into the 21st century.

== Marriage ==
In 1922 he married the actress Diana Hamilton who starred in a number of his plays including Outward Bound. She was the sister of the writer Patrick Hamilton, and Vane helped to boost the young writer's career with a letter of recommendation.

== Sources ==
- Merriam-Webster's Encyclopedia of Literature
