= Falling Leaves (play) =

British writer Sutton Van

- Written by: Sutton Vane
- Original language: English
- Genre: Drama

Premiere
- Date premiered: 2 June 1924
- Place premiered: Pleasure Gardens Theatre, Folkestone

Falling Leaves is a 1924 play by the British writer Sutton Vane. It features a love triangle between three characters.

It premiered at the Pleasure Gardens Theatre in Folkestone before transferring to the Little Theatre in the West End where it ran for 15 performances, failing to recapture the success of his play of the previous year Outward Bound despite the fact it starred Diana Hamilton who had also appeared in the earlier hit. The cast also included Allan Jeayes and Frank Vosper

== Bibliography ==
- Wearing, J. P. The London Stage 1920-1929: A Calendar of Productions, Performers, and Personnel. Rowman & Littlefield, 2014.
