= Outward Bound (play) =

1925 fantasy play by Sutton Vane

- Written by: Sutton Vane
- Original language: English
- Setting: On board ship, the present

Premiere
- Date premiered: September 27, 1923
- Place premiered: Everyman Theatre, London

Outward Bound is a 1923 play written by Sutton Vane.

== Synopsis ==
A group of seven passengers meet in the lounge of an ocean liner at sea and realise that they have no idea why they are there, or where they are bound. Each of them eventually discovers that they are dead, and that they have to face judgment from an Examiner, who will determine whether they are to go to Heaven or Hell.

== Production ==
Producers stayed away from such an unusual combination of fantasy and drama, so Vane staged it himself, painting his own backdrops and building his own sets, at a reported cost of $600. The play proved to be a huge success, becoming the hit of the 1923 London season, transferring from the small Everyman Cinema in Hampstead to the West End.

=== London cast ===
Everyman Theatre, Hampstead, 17 September 1923

- Scrubby – Stanley Lathbury
- Ann – Diana Hamilton
- Henry – William Stack
- Mr Prior – Frederick Cooper
- Mrs Cliveden-Banks – Gladys ffoliott
- The Rev William Duke – Frederick Leister
- Mrs Midgett – Clare Greet
- Mr Lingley – Arthur Page
- The Rev Frank Thomson – Roy Byford

Source: "Outward Bound", The Times, 18 September 1923, p. 10

Garrick Theatre, 15 October 1923

- Scrubby – Stanley Lathbury
- Ann – Diana Hamilton
- Henry – William Stack
- Mr Prior – Leslie Faber
- Mrs Cliveden-Banks – Gladys ffoliott
- The Rev William Duke – John Howell
- Mrs Midgett – Clare Greet
- Mr Lingley – Arthur Page
- The Rev Frank Thomson – E Lyall Swete

Source: "Outward Bound", The Times, 16 October 1923, p. 10

=== Broadway production ===
Such was the initial response to Outward Bound that theatrical producer William Harris Jr. purchased the American rights before the play even opened in the West End. Directed by Robert Milton, the Broadway production premiered January 7, 1924, at the Ritz Theatre, running for 144 performances until May 1924. The original Broadcast cast is recorded at the Internet Broadway Database:

- Dudley Digges as Rev. Frank Thomson
- Margalo Gillmore as Ann
- Charlotte Granville as Mrs. Cliveden-Banks
- Leslie Howard as Henry
- J. M. Kerrigan as Scrubby
- Alfred Lunt as Mr. Prior
- Beryl Mercer as Mrs. Midget
- Eugene Powers as Mr. Lingley
- Lyonel Watts as Rev. William Duke

== Revivals ==
There were London revivals in 1926, 1928 and 1940. In the last of these, the original player of Scrubby, the Charon-like barman, was played by its creator, Stanley Lathbury, with Cathleen Nesbitt, Sarah Churchill, Louise Hampton, Terence De Marney and Anthony Hawtrey.

The play was revived on Broadway at the Playhouse Theatre, from 22 December 1938 to 22 July 1939, running for 255 performances. This production was directed by Otto Preminger, and featured Laurette Taylor, Helen Chandler, and Vincent Price.

The play was revived in London at the Finborough Theatre in 2012, with a cast comprising David Brett, Natalie Walter, Tom Davey, Nicholas Karimi, Carmen Rodriguez, Paul Westwood, Ursula Mohan, Derek Howard and Martin Wimbush.

== Adaptations ==
Vane wrote a novelization of his play, Outward Bound: A Novel, published in 1929.

A film adaptation titled Outward Bound (1930) was produced by Warner Bros. The studio engaged Robert Milton, director of the Broadway production, to direct the motion picture. Dudley Digges, Beryl Mercer and Lyonel Watts reprised their Broadway roles; Leslie Howard, who had played Henry in the stage production, starred in the role that had been played by Alfred Lunt.

The film was remade as Between Two Worlds (1944), with some changes reflecting World War II. John Garfield, Paul Henreid, Sydney Greenstreet, and Eleanor Parker starred.
