= Jungle Menace =

1937 film by George Melford, Harry L. Fraser

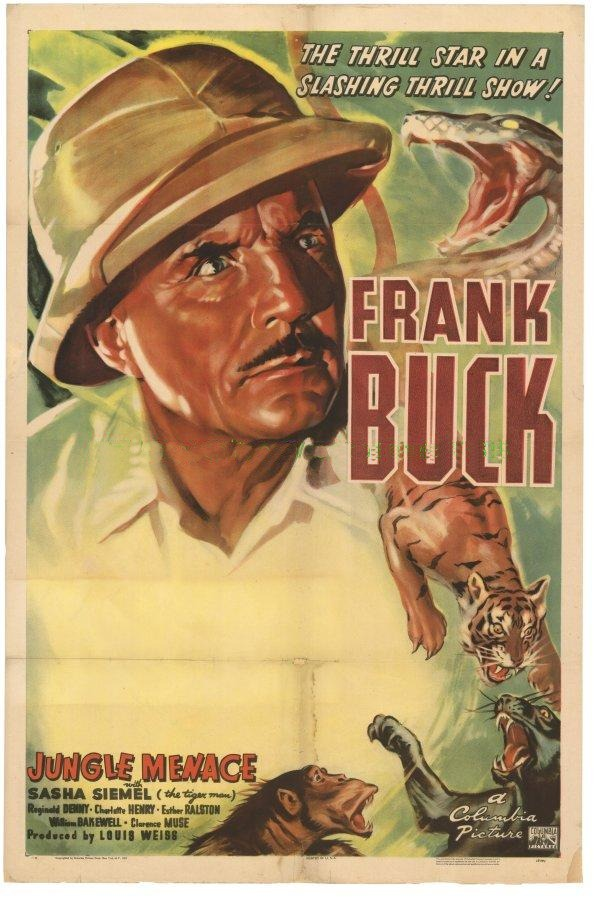
- Original lobby card
- Directed by: Harry L. Fraser; George Melford
- Written by: George M. Merrick; Sherman L. Lowe; Harry Hoyt; George Melford; George Rosener; Arthur Hoerl; Dallas M. Fitzgerald; Gordon Griffith
- Produced by: Robert Mintz (executive); Louis Weiss
- Starring: Frank Buck; Reginald Denny; LeRoy Mason
- Cinematography: Edward Linden; Herman Schopp
- Edited by: Earl Turner
- Music by: Lee Zahler
- Color process: Black and white
- Distributed by: Columbia Pictures
- Release date: October 26, 1937
- Running time: 15 chapters (308 min)
- Country: United States
- Language: English

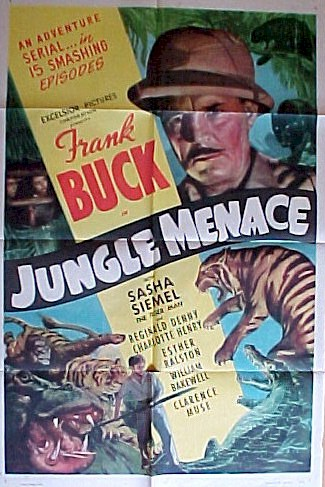
1937 lobby card

Jungle Menace (1937) is the first serial released by Columbia Pictures.

Based on the success of Republic Pictures's 1936 serial Darkest Africa, starring real-life animal trainer Clyde Beatty, Columbia made this exotic jungle serial starring real-life animal collector Frank "Bring 'Em Back Alive" Buck. Set in the fictional land of Seemang in Asia, Buck plays the role of Frank Hardy, a soldier of fortune who intervenes in and investigates attempts to run a rubber plantation owner and his daughter off their land.

It was directed by Harry L. Fraser and George Melford, and filmed in black and white in Stockton, California, USA.

In 1946, material from this serial was re-edited into the 70-minute feature film adaptation called Jungle Terror.

== Plot ==
In the Asian province of Seemang, where the Bay of Bengal meets the jungle, Chandler Elliott (John St. Polis) owns a large and prosperous rubber plantation. His attractive daughter, Dorothy (Charlotte Henry), is engaged to neighboring planter Tom Banning (William Bakewell), but troubles are brewing for both plantations. They ship a cargo of rubber on a riverboat to be taken to an ocean port, but the boat is hi-jacked by river pirates. They kill the crew and steal the shipment. This is part of a plot by Jim Murphy (LeRoy Mason), Elliott's plantation manager, and others to force Elliott to sell his plantation. Local explorer Frank Hardy (Frank Buck) determines to find out who is behind the plot.

== Cast ==
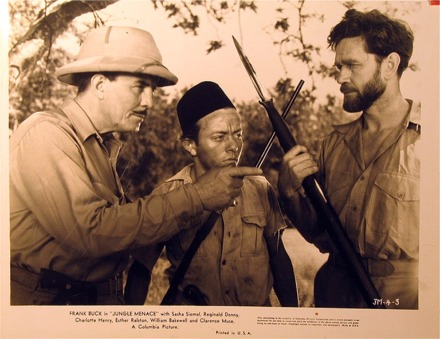
Promotional photo for Jungle Menace, showing Frank Buck (left) and Sasha Siemel (right)

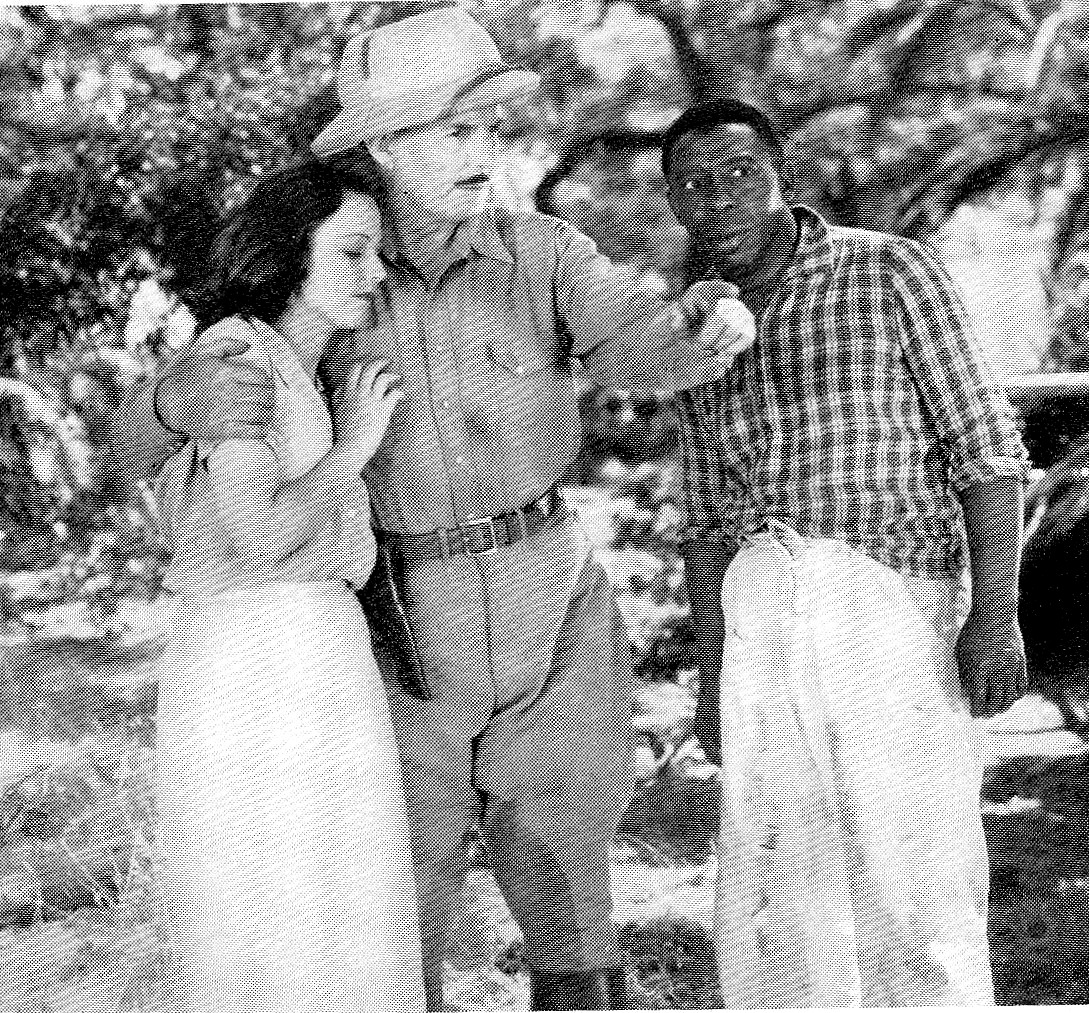
Left to right: Charlotte Henry, Frank Buck, and Clarence Muse in Jungle Menace

- Frank Buck as Frank Hardy
- Reginald Denny as Ralph Marshall
- LeRoy Mason as Murphy
- Richard Tucker as Robert Banning
- Duncan Renaldo as Roget
- William Bakewell as Tom Banning
- Charlotte Henry as Dorothy Elliott
- Matthew Betz as Det. Lt. Starrett
- Sasha Siemel as 'Tiger' Van Dorn
- George Rosener as The Professor
- John Davidson as Dr. Coleman
- Robert Warwick as DCI Angus MacLeod

== Production ==
In his autobiography, director Harry L. Fraser described filming the scene in Jungle Menace during which a boa constrictor attacks the heroine Dorothy (Charlotte Henry). The villain has tied Dorothy hand and foot and she thrashes wildly, terrified when she suddenly sees the huge snake:

"The snake was in no hurry. Slowly he slithered across the girl's body, while she screamed and struggled. He turned, looking for a spot to slip under her to make his first wrap. I motioned to the reptile crew to get ready, and a split-second later gave them the signal to move in. But now, the maddened snake fought them and did its best to coil around one of the men. Before that happened, however, I had cut, and we had a good cliff-hanger with our terror-stricken heroine to close the episode."

Buck drank heavily on set and was not always sober during filming. Fraser recounts Buck justified it saying “I’d die in the jungle just drinking coffee. I drink martinis, Harry. Keep me going. Now, my problem is where can I get a thermos filled with martinis at six o’clock in the morning?”

== Chapters ==
Each of the fifteen chapters was 20 minutes long and contained plenty of action: "One man defying a thousand deaths in a green hell of creeping horror! The fearless Frank Buck in his most hair-raising role! Merciless killers...a beautiful hostage...a cargo of wild animals run loose when the typhoon strikes! Terrifying adventures torn out of the heart of cruelest Asia!" The chapter titles are:

1. River Pirates
2. Deadly Enemies
3. Flames of Hate
4. One-way Ride
5. Man of Mystery
6. Shanghaied
7. Tiger Eyes
8. The Frame-up
9. The Cave of Mystery
10. Flirting with Death
11. Ship of Doom
12. Mystery Island
13. The Typhoon
14. Murder at Sea
15. Give 'em Rope

_{Source:}

== Critical reception ==
Film critics enjoyed the show: "Kids will love Jungle Menace for its harem-scarum adventure and for the presence of Frank Buck, with his Wild Animals Associates, Inc. Frank Buck plays the hero, Frank Hardy, when gangdom invades the rubber business and river pirates grab off plantation cargo. Plenty of old-time names are in the cast: Reginald Denny is a plantation foreman, Esther Ralston an owner, Charlotte Henry and William Bakewell play young lovers; also featured are Clarence Muse, Willie Fung, Leroy Mason, Richard Tucker, and Duncan Renaldo."

Later critics would question the treatment of animals in the film: "Shifts in public perception of the increasingly threatened wild and the growing controversy over the practice of keeping wild animals in captivity have recast many of these former heroes into villains." Joanne Carol Joys said that a kind of Orientalism was implicit in the film's display of "masculine superiority and dominance over the wilderness with the capability of rendering it submissive and orderly".
