= God's Country and the Man (1937 film) =

- Theatrical release poster
- Directed by: Robert North Bradbury
- Screenplay by: Robert Emmett Tansey
- Produced by: Robert North Bradbury
- Starring: Tom Keene; Betty Compson; Charlotte Henry; Charles King; Billy Bletcher; James Sheridan
- Cinematography: Bert Longenecker
- Edited by: Howard Dillinger
- Music by: Frank Sanucci
- Production company: Monogram Pictures
- Distributed by: Monogram Pictures
- Release date: September 2, 1937
- Running time: 56 minutes
- Country: United States
- Language: English

God's Country and the Man is a 1937 American Western film directed by Robert North Bradbury and written by Robert Emmett Tansey. The film stars Tom Keene, Betty Compson, Charlotte Henry, Charles King, Billy Bletcher and James Sheridan. The film was released on September 2, 1937, by Monogram Pictures.

== Plot ==
Cowboy Jim Reid and his friends go investigate the murder of Jim's father, however while doing that they find a vein of gold. The killer also finds about the vein and comes back to take it.

== Cast ==
- Tom Keene as Jim Reid
- Betty Compson as Roxey Moore
- Charlotte Henry as Betty Briggs
- Charles King as Red Gentry
- Billy Bletcher as Sandy Briggs
- James Sheridan as Pete
- Eddie Parker as Bill Briggs
- Bob McKenzie as Ed
- Merrill McCormick as Brokaw
