= Between Two Worlds (1944 film) =

American World War II fantasy drama film

- Australian film poster
- Directed by: Edward A. Blatt
- Screenplay by: Daniel Fuchs
- Based on: Outward Bound; 1923 play by Sutton Vane
- Produced by: Mark Hellinger; Jack L. Warner (uncredited)
- Starring: John Garfield; Paul Henreid; Sydney Greenstreet; Eleanor Parker
- Cinematography: Carl E. Guthrie
- Edited by: Rudi Fehr
- Music by: Erich Wolfgang Korngold
- Distributed by: Warner Bros. Pictures
- Release date: May 20, 1944
- Running time: 112 minutes
- Language: English

Between Two Worlds is a 1944 American World War II fantasy drama film starring John Garfield, Paul Henreid, Sydney Greenstreet, and Eleanor Parker. It is a remake of the film Outward Bound (1930), itself based on the 1923 play Outward Bound by Sutton Vane. It is not, as is sometimes claimed, a remake of Fritz Lang's Destiny (original title Der müde Tod).

== Plot ==
During World War II, a diverse group of people in war-ravaged London book passage for the United States, but Austrian pianist-turned-soldier in the Résistance Henry Bergner is unable to join them, for want of an exit permit. Searching the streets for him during a German air raid, his wife Ann witnesses a bomb obliterate a car full of passengers on their way to the docks. She returns to their apartment to find that Henry has turned on the gas to commit suicide. Despite his opposition, she joins him.

Suddenly, the pair find themselves on board a fog-shrouded ocean liner. Ann recognizes the other passengers as those killed in the bombing. The steward, Scrubby, asks them not to tell the others they are dead; it is better that they come to the realization themselves.

At first, the couple is delighted to be together eternally, but they find their situation unbearable as they become acquainted with the others. Timid Anglican priest Reverend William Duke yearns to more actively help others, while American merchant sailor Pete Musick looks forward to seeing his infant child for the first time. A kind-hearted older woman, Mrs. Midget, tells Thomas Prior, a newspaperman, that she would be content with a little place of her own.

Prior is the first to learn the truth when he eavesdrops on Henry and Ann, and, spurned by his wealth-seeking actress companion, Maxine Russell, in favor of unscrupulous war profiteer Mr. Lingley, reveals all to the other passengers.

Scrubby reveals that they are to be judged by the Examiner. When the Examiner arrives, he is revealed to be the deceased Reverend Tim Thompson, someone Duke knew well in life. Duke is given another opportunity in Heaven, as an Examiner-in-training. One by one, the other passengers are judged and sent ashore to their fates.

Wealthy Mr. Lingley discovers he can neither bribe nor browbeat his way into Heaven and must pay for the suffering he inflicted. Genevieve and Benjamin Cliveden-Banks are a mismatched couple. She is a shallow, mercenary social climber who married him for his wealth and position and was unfaithful. She is at first delighted to learn that she will reside in a castle, but then the Examiner tells her she will live alone. Her husband suffered his wife's infidelities because he loved her and hoped she would reciprocate, but his love wore out and, when given the choice, he declines to join her. Instead, he is to be reunited with his old chums.

Prior then barges in, followed by Russell. He is defiant, but she regrets her life choices. She leaves with the hope of redemption. Prior tries to gamble his way into Heaven by rigging a deck of cards, but when his sleight of hand is trumped by the Examiner's powers, he demands oblivion. Instead, he is told that the afterlife will be no different from his life, with one exception: he will no longer be able to hide behind his deceptions; he will not be able to delude himself as to who and what he really is. Mrs. Midget offers to accompany Prior, giving up her cottage and garden in Heaven. The Examiner reveals, after Prior leaves the room, that Mrs. Midget is Prior's mother. She gave him up when he was very young so he could have a better chance in America; being reunited with him is her idea of Heaven.

Musick the sailor bemoans not being able to see his family again but is consoled when told he will be reunited with them eventually.

Finally, there is the special case of Henry Bergner. Because he committed suicide, he is doomed to remain on the ship for eternity while Ann goes to Heaven. Ann protests that her suicide was voluntary and that nothing will separate her from Henry. She refuses to go ashore with the Examiner. Scrubby—who is doomed to remain on the ship because he, too, was a suicide—pleads the matter with the Examiner. Returned to their apartment, Henry finds a window shattered by a bomb blast, letting in fresh air and thwarting their suicide attempt. He revives Ann, and they rejoice at being given back the gift of life.

== Cast ==
- John Garfield as Tom Prior
- Paul Henreid as Henry Bergner
- Sydney Greenstreet as Reverend Tim Thompson
- Eleanor Parker as Ann Bergner
- Edmund Gwenn as Scrubby
- George Tobias as Pete Musick
- George Coulouris as Mr. Lingley
- Faye Emerson as Miss Maxine Russell
- Sara Allgood as Mrs. Midget
- Dennis King as Reverend William Duke
- Isobel Elsom as Genevieve Cliveden-Banks
- Gilbert Emery as Benjamin Cliveden-Banks

== Differences between versions ==
Neither the original play, Outward Bound, nor its 1930 film version have a war setting. There are fewer characters in the play and the earlier film, and no one is killed by a bomb, but the plot is essentially the same, as is much of the dialogue. However, because there is no bomb explosion, neither the audience nor the ship passengers are aware that the passengers are dead until well into the play, not even Henry and Ann. The play and earlier film also share a number of other differences from Between Two Worlds, one of them being that Henry and Ann are lovers and Ann cannot obtain a divorce from her husband. When they board the ship, the audience is led to believe that they are running away to be together, and it is not until the end that it is revealed that they tried to commit suicide. The Hays Code, which was not in effect in 1930, when Outward Bound was filmed, prevented Ann and Henry from being depicted as illicit lovers, and instead demanded that they be turned into husband and wife. However, the suicide aspect of the story went unchanged from the original.

Paul Henreid wrote in his memoirs that he felt the film was hurt by revealing the characters were dead at the beginning, which "took away from the eerie quality of the play." He says director Blatt was "a pleasant fellow but inexperienced."

== Home media ==
Between Two Worlds was released by Warner Archive on DVD.

== See also ==
- List of American films of 1944

== See films with similar subjects ==
- A Guy Named Joe
- A Matter of Life and Death
- Here Comes Mr. Jordan
- The Halfway House
