= Fanny Foley Herself =

1931 film

- Theatrical poster for film
- Directed by: Melville W. Brown
- Written by: Juliet Wilbor Tompkins (story); Carey Wilson (adaptation & dialogue); Bernard Schubert (add'l dialogue)
- Produced by: John E. Burch (supervisor)
- Starring: Edna May Oliver; Helen Chandler; John Darrow
- Cinematography: Ray Rennahan
- Music by: Max Steiner
- Production company: RKO Radio Pictures
- Distributed by: RKO Radio Pictures
- Release date: October 10, 1931
- Running time: 73 minutes
- Country: United States
- Language: English

Fanny Foley Herself is a 1931 American pre-Code comedy-drama film shot entirely in Technicolor. The film was the second feature to be filmed using a new Technicolor process, which removed grain and resulted in improved color. It was released under the title Top of the Bill in Britain. It survives in a complete Technicolor copy under that title at the BFI.

== Plot ==
Fanny Foley, a widowed woman with two daughters Lenore and Carmen, attempts to revive her career as a vaudeville performer. Her wealthy father-in-law, Seely, believes that a vaudeville performer is not fit to bring up children properly, forces Fanny to choose between her daughters or her career. In the end, all is forgiven and the father-in-law asks Fanny to sing one of her songs.

== Cast ==
- Edna May Oliver as Fanny Foley
- Hobart Bosworth as Seely
- Florence Roberts as Lucy
- Rochelle Hudson as Carmen
- Helen Chandler as Lenore
- John Darrow as Teddy
- Robert Emmett O'Connor as Burns
- Harry Stubbs as Crosby

(cast list as per AFI database)

== Production background ==
- As a result of the quality of the color work in The Runaround (1931), Radio Pictures decided to produce three more pictures in the improved Technicolor process. Only Fanny Foley Herself was completed and released in Technicolor. The titles of the two other features were Marcheta and Bird of Paradise. Marcheta seems to have been abandoned, while Bird of Paradise was changed into a black-and-white production starring Dolores del Río and Joel McCrea.
- This was Edna May Oliver's first appearance in color. She appeared in color only once more, in the 1939 film Drums Along the Mohawk. She did not appear in the Technicolor sequences of The American Venus (1926).
- This was Helen Chandler's only appearance in a color film. She did not appear in the color sequences of Radio Parade of 1935 (1934). She may have appeared in the color sequences of the silent film The Joy Girl (1927). This film, rumored to exist at the Museum of Modern Art, is unavailable for inspection.

== Reception ==
In October 1931, The New York Times said, "There are greenish skies, steel-tinted nights, amber lights, frocks and gowns of pastel shades, most of this prismatic work being quite well done. But whether it is, on the whole, more effective than black and white is a matter of opinion."

== Preservation status ==
A complete copy of the film (with the British title) survives in the BFI archive. A trailer of 200 ft also survives.

== See also ==
- List of early color feature films
