= Diana Hamilton (actress) =

British stage actress and playwright (1898–1951)

Diana Hamilton (1898–1951) was a British stage actress and playwright. Born Helen (Lalla) Hamilton. she married the actor and playwright Sutton Vane in 1922, and the following year starred in his breakthrough play Outward Bound in the West End. The following year she starred in Vane's Falling Leaves. Other West End appearances included Edward Knoblock's Mumsie and Somerset Maugham's For Services Rendered in 1932. In 1933 she acted in Before Sunset, Miles Malleson's English-language version of the German play Vor Sonnenaufgang by Gerhart Hauptmann. She later wrote or co-wrote several stage plays.

Her brothers were the writers Patrick Hamilton, whose career was boosted by an early recommendation by his brother-in-law Sutton Vane, and Bruce Hamilton.

== Bibliography ==
- Harding, John. Patrick Hamilton: His Life and Work : a Critical Study. Greenwich Exchange, 2007.
- Wearing, J. P. The London Stage 1920-1929: A Calendar of Productions, Performers, and Personnel. Rowman & Littlefield, 2014.
