= Young Dynamite =

1937 film directed by Leslie Goodwins

- Directed by: Leslie Goodwins
- Screenplay by: Joseph O'Donnell; Stanley Roberts; Arthur G. Durlam (adaptation)
- Produced by: Maurice Conn
- Starring: Frankie Darro; Kane Richmond; Charlotte Henry
- Cinematography: John Kline
- Edited by: Richard G. Wray
- Production company: Conn Productions
- Distributed by: Ambassador Pictures
- Release date: September 15, 1937 (US)
- Running time: 57 minutes
- Country: United States
- Language: English

Young Dynamite is a 1937 American crime film directed by Leslie Goodwins from a screenplay by Joseph O'Donnell and Stanley Roberts, adaptation by Arthur G. Durlam. The film stars Frankie Darro, Kane Richmond, and Charlotte Henry.

== Cast ==
- Frankie Darro as Freddie Shields
- Kane Richmond as Tom Marlin
- Charlotte Henry as Jane Shields
- William Castello as Flash Slavin
- David Sharpe as John Shields
- Carleton Young as Spike
- Pat Gleason (actor)|Pat Gleason]] as Butch Barker
- Frank Austin as Doc Clark/Endeberry
- Frank Sarasino as Tony Rankin
