= Robert Mintz =

American film producer

- Born: April 4, 1897; New York City, U.S.
- Died: May 9, 1971 (aged 74); New York City, U.S.
- Occupation: film producer
- Known for: work with Frank Buck
- Spouse: Hannah Mintz

Robert Mintz (April 4, 1897 – May 9, 1971) was a producer of the Frank Buck film serial Jungle Menace.

== Early years ==
Robert Mintz was the son of Aaron Mintz, a men's clothing merchant, and Ray Mintz, Russian immigrants. He was born and grew up in New York City.

== Career ==
In 1934, Mintz's company, Exploitation Pictures, produced the Exploitation film Enlighten Thy Daughter (alternate title Blind Fools), starring Claire Whitney and Charles Eaton. At the same time, Mintz formed a partnership with Louis Weiss to film direct adaptations of Broadway productions. Two of their films were Drums O' Voodoo (1934) and Before Morning.

== Work with Frank Buck ==
In 1937, Mintz and Weiss produced the Frank Buck serial Jungle Menace.

== Later life ==
Mintz worked as a theater manager, according to the 1940 US Census. He died in New York City aged 74.
