= Outward Bound (film) =

1930 film

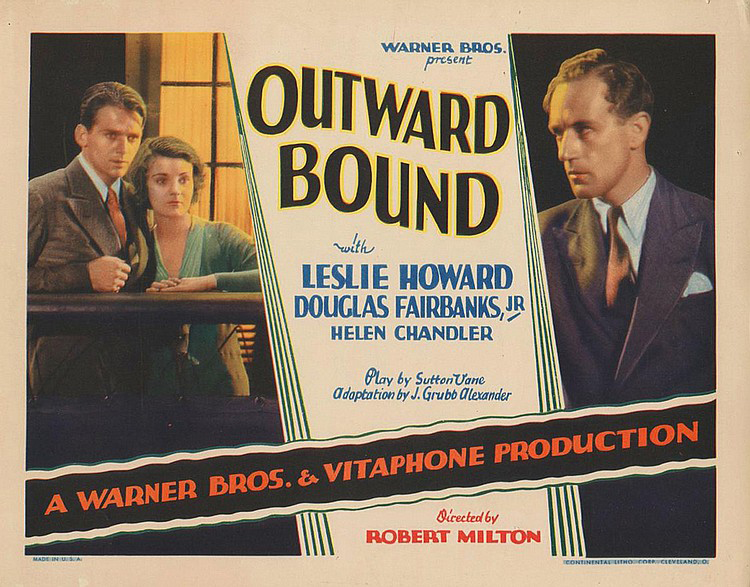
- Lobby card
- Directed by: Robert Milton
- Screenplay by: J. Grubb Alexander
- Based on: Outward Bound; 1923 play by Sutton Vane
- Starring: Leslie Howard; Douglas Fairbanks Jr. Helen Chandler; Beryl Mercer; Dudley Digges; Alec B. Francis
- Cinematography: Hal Mohr
- Edited by: Ralph Dawson
- Music by: Erno Rapee
- Production company: Warner Bros. Pictures
- Distributed by: Warner Bros. Pictures
- Release date: November 29, 1930
- Running time: 83 minutes
- Country: United States
- Language: English

Outward Bound is a 1930 American pre-Code drama film based on the 1923 hit play of the same name by Sutton Vane. It stars Leslie Howard, Douglas Fairbanks Jr., Helen Chandler, Beryl Mercer, Montagu Love, Alison Skipworth, Alec B. Francis, and Dudley Digges. The film was later remade, with some changes, as Between Two Worlds (1944).

== Plot ==
Outward Bound (1930)

Henry and Ann, a pair of young lovers, are planning to commit suicide and are worried about what will happen to their dog when they are gone. The scene then changes to a disparate group of passengers who find themselves aboard a darkened, fog-enshrouded crewless ship, sailing to an unknown destination.

Their stories are revealed one by one. Tom Prior, a prodigal son, discovers that he's traveling with his ex-boss, Mr. Lingley, a captain of industry; his mother, Mrs. Midget, whose identity is unknown to him, is curious about how her son is doing; Mrs. Cliveden-Banks, an affected socialite, chats with Scrubby the steward; Rev. William Duke, a clergyman, is keen about his missionary work in the London slums; and the young couple, Henry and Ann, who are facing an impossible love affair and have decided that they cannot live without each other. They now wonder if they will be together forever.

In time, the passengers slowly realize what is going on—they are all dead. They will be judged during the course of the voyage, and go either to Heaven, or to Hell. Arriving at their destination, they await judgment by Thompson, the "examiner."

Henry and Ann, who made a suicide attempt, now hover in a sort of limbo between life and death, have not quite crossed over. Scrubby, the ship's steward, has already been condemned to sail the ship for eternity, having previously committed suicide himself. Henry is eventually saved from asphyxiation by gas poisoning when his dog breaks a window pane. He calls to Ann, she revives, and together they are rescued by neighbors and taken away in an ambulance.

== Cast ==
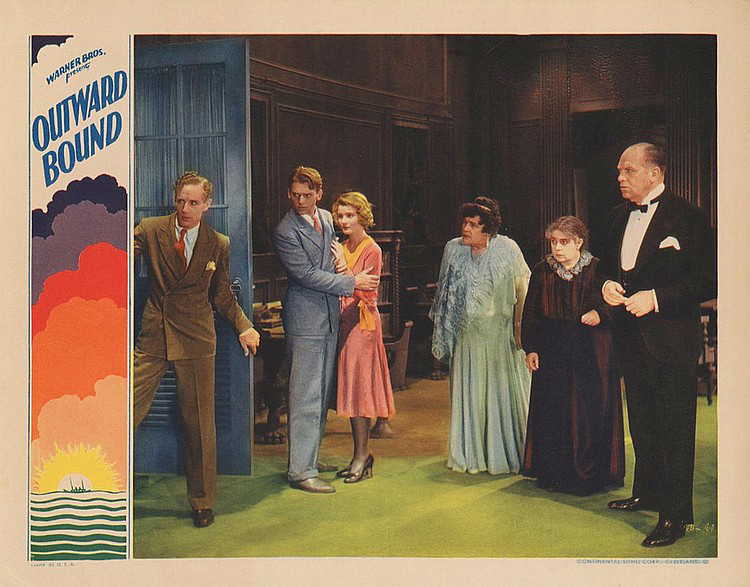
Lobby card featuring (from left) Leslie Howard, Douglas Fairbanks Jr., Helen Chandler, Alison Skipworth, Beryl Mercer and Montagu Love

- Leslie Howard as Tom Prior
- Douglas Fairbanks Jr. as Henry
- Beryl Mercer as Mrs Midget
- Dudley Digges as Thompson
- Helen Chandler as Ann
- Alec B. Francis as Scrubby
- Montagu Love as Mr Lingley
- Lyonel Watts as Reverend William Duke
- Alison Skipworth as Mrs Cliveden-Banks
- Walter Kingsford as The Policeman (uncredited)

== Production ==
Leslie Howard played the role of Henry in the stage production of Outward Bound which ran at the Ritz Theatre in New York City January 7 – May 10, 1924. Dudley Digges, Beryl Mercer and Lyonel Watts all reprised their roles for the film. Alfred Lunt played Tom Prior and Margalo Gillmore played Ann. In the film, Howard took Lunt's part and Douglas Fairbanks Jr. played the role originally performed by Howard.

"I never saw all of it," said Fairbanks about the film. "It gave me the creeps. Still does, just thinking about it. It was a prestige picture, never made a cent."

== Preservation ==
The film survives intact and has been broadcast on television and cable (Turner Classic Movies) from United Artists Associated. It is preserved in the Library of Congress collection.
