= Bruce Hamilton (writer) =

English novelist

Arthur Douglas Bruce Hamilton CMG (3 July 1900, Regent's Park, London – 24 March 1974, Brighton, Sussex) was an English novelist.

== Family ==
Bruce Hamilton's younger brother Patrick was a successful novelist and playwright, and his sister was the actress and playwright Diana Hamilton. Their father, Bernard Hamilton (1863–1930), a barrister, also wrote fiction.

== Writing ==
A godson of Arthur Conan Doyle, Bruce Hamilton wrote six crime novels in the 1930s, then four more novels over the next 30 years. Unlike many crime fiction writers, he preferred to try something different with each novel, rather than use a successful formula. He also wrote a biography of his brother Patrick in 1972.

His 1946 novel Pro: An English Tragedy, which was not a crime novel, is particularly admired in cricket circles for its realistic and poignant portrayal of the life of a professional county cricketer in England either side of the First World War.

A collection of his manuscripts and correspondence is held at the Harry Ransom Center at the University of Texas at Austin.

== Life ==
Hamilton moved to Barbados in 1938 to take up a teaching post. Soon afterwards, he began writing on international matters for The Barbados Advocate. He stayed in Barbados, working in the education service. In 1964 he was awarded the CMG for his service.

In December 1933 he married Marie Aileen Lorna Laurie (1907–1987), who was born in Barbados.

== Bibliography ==
=== Novels ===
- To Be Hanged: A Story of Murder (1930)
- Hue and Cry (1931)
- The Spring Term, etc. (1933)
- Middle Class Murder (1936)
- The Brighton Murder Trial: Rex v Rhodes (1937)
- Traitor's Way (1939)
- Pro: An English Tragedy (1946)
- So Sad, So Fresh (1952)
- Too Much of Water (1958)
- Let Him Have Judgment (1970)

=== Non-fiction ===
- Cricket in Barbados (1947)
- Barbados & the Confederation Question, 1871–1885 (1956)
- The Light Went Out: The Life of Patrick Hamilton (1972)
