= The Old Lady Shows Her Medals =

Play by J. M. Barrie

The Old Lady Shows Her Medals is a play by J. M. Barrie. It was first published in his collection Echoes of the War in 1918, which also included the stories The New Word, Barbara's Wedding and A Well-Remembered Voice. It is set on the home front of World War I.

It was adapted as the film Seven Days' Leave (1930), starring Gary Cooper, whilst elements from it also appeared in the film Lady for a Day (1933). It was later adapted for television under its original title in 1937 by Moultrie Kelsall.

David Rogers, with composer Mark Bucci, adapted the play into a one-act musical that was published in 1960 by Samuel French.

== Radio adaptations ==
The Old Lady Shows Her Medals was presented on Theatre Guild on the Air 3 February 1952. The 30-minute adaptation starred Alfred Lunt and Lynn Fontanne. It was also presented on Screen Guild Players 7 October 1946. Ethel Barrymore, Lionel Barrymore, and Douglas Fairbanks, Jr. starred in the adaptation.
