= Helen Chandler =

American actress (1908–1965)

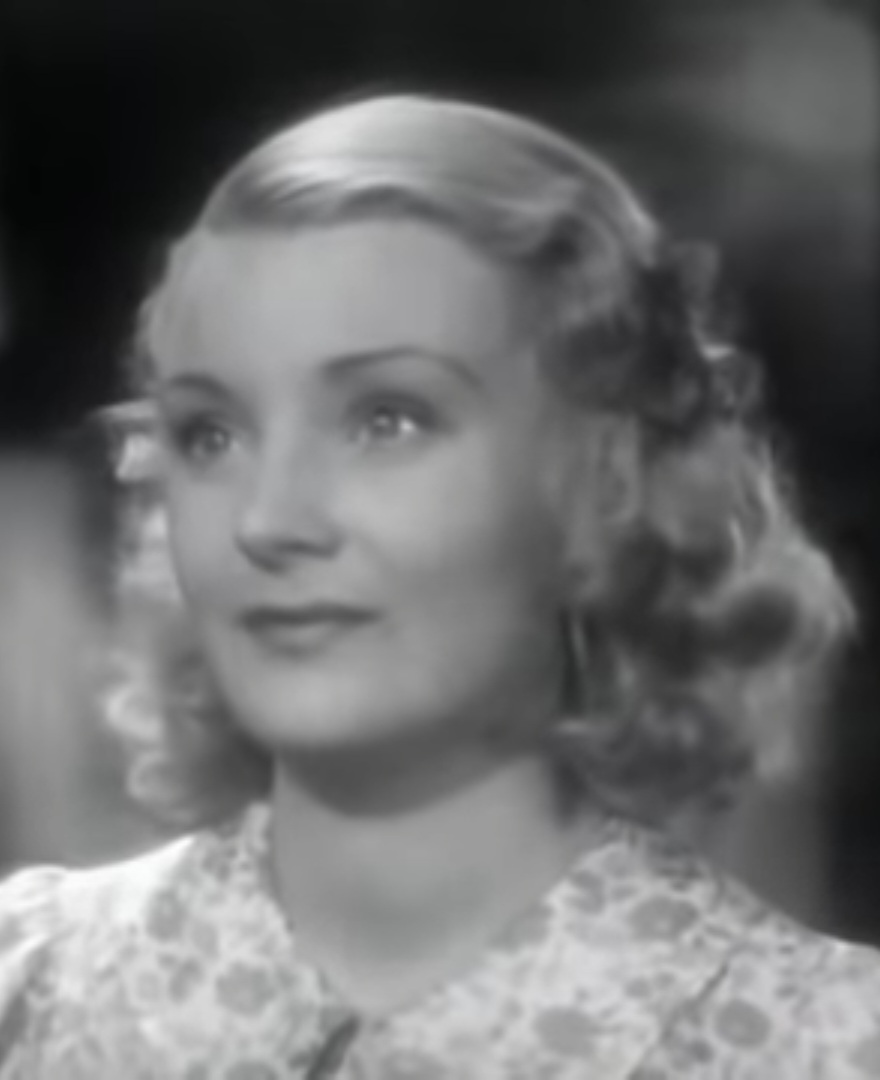
- Chandler in Mr. Boggs Steps Out (1938)
- Born: February 1, 1908; New York City, New York U.S.
- Died: April 30, 1965 (aged 57); Hollywood, Los Angeles, California, U.S.
- Resting place: Hollywood Forever Cemetery
- Occupation: Actress
- Years active: 1927–1938
- Spouses: Cyril Hume (m. 1930; div. 1934) Bramwell Fletcher (m. 1935; div. 1940) Walter S. Piascik (m. 1943)

Helen Chandler (February 1, 1908 – April 30, 1965) was an American film and theatre actress, best known for playing Mina Harker in the 1931 horror film Dracula.

== Career ==
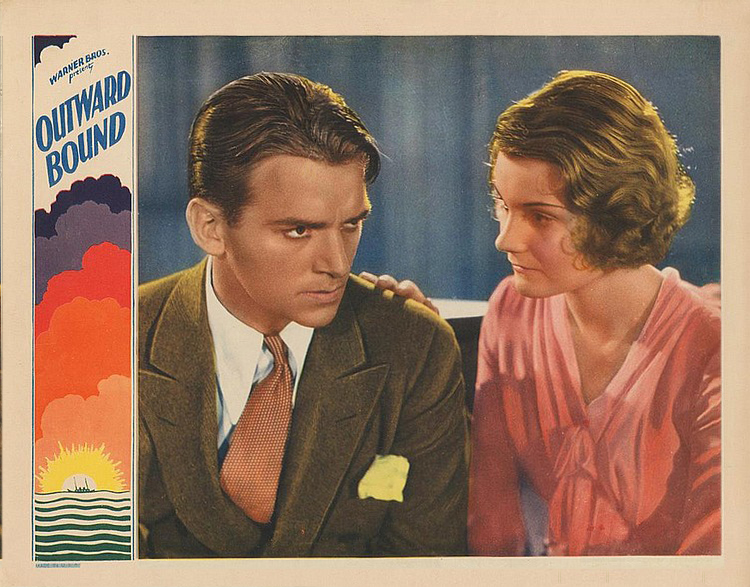
Douglas Fairbanks Jr. and Helen Chandler in Outward Bound (1930)

Chandler attended the Professional Children's School in New York and made her Broadway debut on September 2, 1918 at the Globe Theatre in Penrod, Edward E. Rose's adaptation of the like-named Booth Tarkington series of stories. Her early performances include Arthur Hopkins' 1920 production of Richard III, which starred John Barrymore, Macbeth in 1921 with Lionel Barrymore; Hedvig in Henrik Ibsen's The Wild Duck in 1925 and Ophelia in the 1925 modern dress version of Hamlet starring Basil Sydney. By the time of her first film she had been in over twenty Broadway productions.

She made her film debut in 1927 in the silent film The Music Master and in 1930 joined Leslie Howard, Douglas Fairbanks Jr., and Beryl Mercer for Outward Bound, the film version of the stage success. The unusual story told of a group of passengers on an ocean liner who gradually realize that they are all dead and will soon face the Last Judgment. Chandler, with her blonde hair and ethereal quality, was considered to be perfectly cast, and she received critical praise for her performance.

Chandler joined David Manners and Bela Lugosi in 1931's Dracula, which became one of the most successful movies made at that time. Chandler appeared with Manners that same year in the Lost Generation celebration of alcohol in Paris, The Last Flight, also starring Richard Barthelmess and John Mack Brown. She achieved more successes in A House Divided (1931) and Christopher Strong (1933), all the while dividing her time among films, radio work, and theater roles in Los Angeles, New York and London.

She starred in British actor Will Hay's 1934 movie, Radio Parade of 1935 and played a role on Lux Radio in Alibi Ike with Joe E. Brown (1937). Among her later stage successes were Within The Gates in 1934, Pride and Prejudice in 1935, Lady Precious Stream in 1936 with then-husband Bramwell Fletcher, a reprise of her film role in Outward Bound in 1938 and various productions of Boy Meets Girl and Noël Coward's Tonight at 8.30

== Personal life ==
Helen Frances Chandler was born February 1, 1908, in New York, according to family, although the date and place have been reported as 1906 in Charleston, South Carolina and New York in 1909. Her parents were Leland S. and Frances (née Murray) Chandler. Her family did live in Charleston for a time, where her younger brother Leland M. Chandler was born. She and her brother were raised by their mother as stage children, although her brother rebelled and quit. Chandler would later live off and on with her brother and his family in the Los Angeles area from the 1930s to 1950s.

Chandler's first marriage was to writer Cyril Hume in 1930, and they divorced in 1934. She subsequently married actor Bramwell Fletcher on February 14, 1935, at Riverside Church in New York, but they divorced in 1940. From February 3, 1943, until her death, Chandler was married to Walter S. Piascik, a merchant seaman.

By the late 1930s she was battling alcoholism and her acting career declined. She was hospitalized several times but was unable to gain control over her life. In 1950, Chandler was severely burned in an apartment fire, caused by her falling asleep while smoking. She survived but her body was badly disfigured. Her alcoholism continued unabated after the accident.

== Death ==
Chandler died on April 30, 1965, following surgery in Hollywood, California and was cremated according to her wishes. She was survived by her husband, Walter Piascik. Chandler's original interment site was the private vault at the Chapel of the Pines Crematory in Los Angeles. After an online fundraising effort led by researcher Jessica Wahl and Hollywood Graveyard YouTube channel creator Arthur Dark and with the permission of her surviving family, Chandler's ashes were reinterred in the Cathedral Mausoleum of Hollywood Forever Cemetery on July 13, 2023.

== Filmography ==
- The Music Master (1927) as Jenny
- The Joy Girl (1927) as Flora
- Mother's Boy (1929) as Rose Lyndon
- Salute (1929) as Nancy Wayne
- The Sky Hawk (1929) as Joan Allan
- Rough Romance (1930) as Marna Reynolds
- Outward Bound (1930) as Ann
- Mothers Cry (1930) as Beattie Williams
- Dracula (1931) as Mina Seward
- Daybreak (1931) as Laura Taub
- Salvation Nell (1931) as Nell Saunders
- The Last Flight (1931) as Nikki
- Fanny Foley Herself (1931) as Lenore
- A House Divided (1931) as Ruth Evans
- Vanity Street (1932) as Jeanie Gregg
- Behind Jury Doors (1932) as Elsa Lanfield
- Christopher Strong (1933) as Monica Strong
- Alimony Madness (1933) as Joan Armstrong
- Dance Hall Hostess (1933) as Nora Marsh
- Goodbye Again (1933) as Elizabeth Clochessy
- The Worst Woman in Paris? (1933) as Mary Dunbar
- Long Lost Father (1934) as Lindsey Lane
- Midnight Alibi (1934) as Abigail 'Abbie' Ardsley as a Girl
- Unfinished Symphony (1934) as Emmie Passeuter
- Radio Parade of 1935 (1934) as Joan Garland
- It's a Bet (1935) as Clare
- Mr. Boggs Steps Out (1938) as Oleander Tubbs (final film role)
- Renfield (2023) as Mina Seward (posthumous; archive footage)
