= Man Hunt (1933 film) =

1933 film by Irving Cummings

- Directed by: Irving Cummings
- Written by: Sam Mintz; Leonard Praskins
- Produced by: J. G. Bachmann
- Starring: Junior Durkin; Charlotte Henry; Dorothy Davenport; Arthur Vinton; Edward LeSaint
- Cinematography: Joseph A. Valentine
- Edited by: William Morgan
- Music by: Howard Jackson
- Production company: J. G. Bachmann Productions
- Distributed by: RKO Pictures
- Release date: May 24, 1933
- Running time: 65 minutes
- Country: United States
- Language: English

Man Hunt is a 1933 American pre-Code mystery film directed by Irving Cummings and written by Sam Mintz and Leonard Praskins. The film stars Junior Durkin, Charlotte Henry, Dorothy Davenport, Arthur Vinton and Edward LeSaint. The film was released on May 24, 1933, by RKO Pictures.

== Plot ==
Teenager Junior Scott has a passion for mysteries and detective stories and he has been fired from many jobs because of it. One day, he is given the chance to live his passion when one of his neighbors, who has a daughter about his age, is murdered in an unexplained situation. The victim's secret is that he was a fugitive, charged for a heist he didn't commit. The detective in charge of the investigation allows Junior to help out, but it is soon clear that he has sinister motives.

== Cast ==
- Junior Durkin as William 'Junior' Scott, Jr.
- Charlotte Henry as Josie Woodward
- Dorothy Davenport as Mrs. Scott
- Arthur Vinton as James J. Wilkie
- Edward LeSaint as Henry Woodward
- Richard Carle as Sheriff Bascom
- Carl Gross as Abraham Jones
