= Seven Days Leave (1930 film) =

1930 film

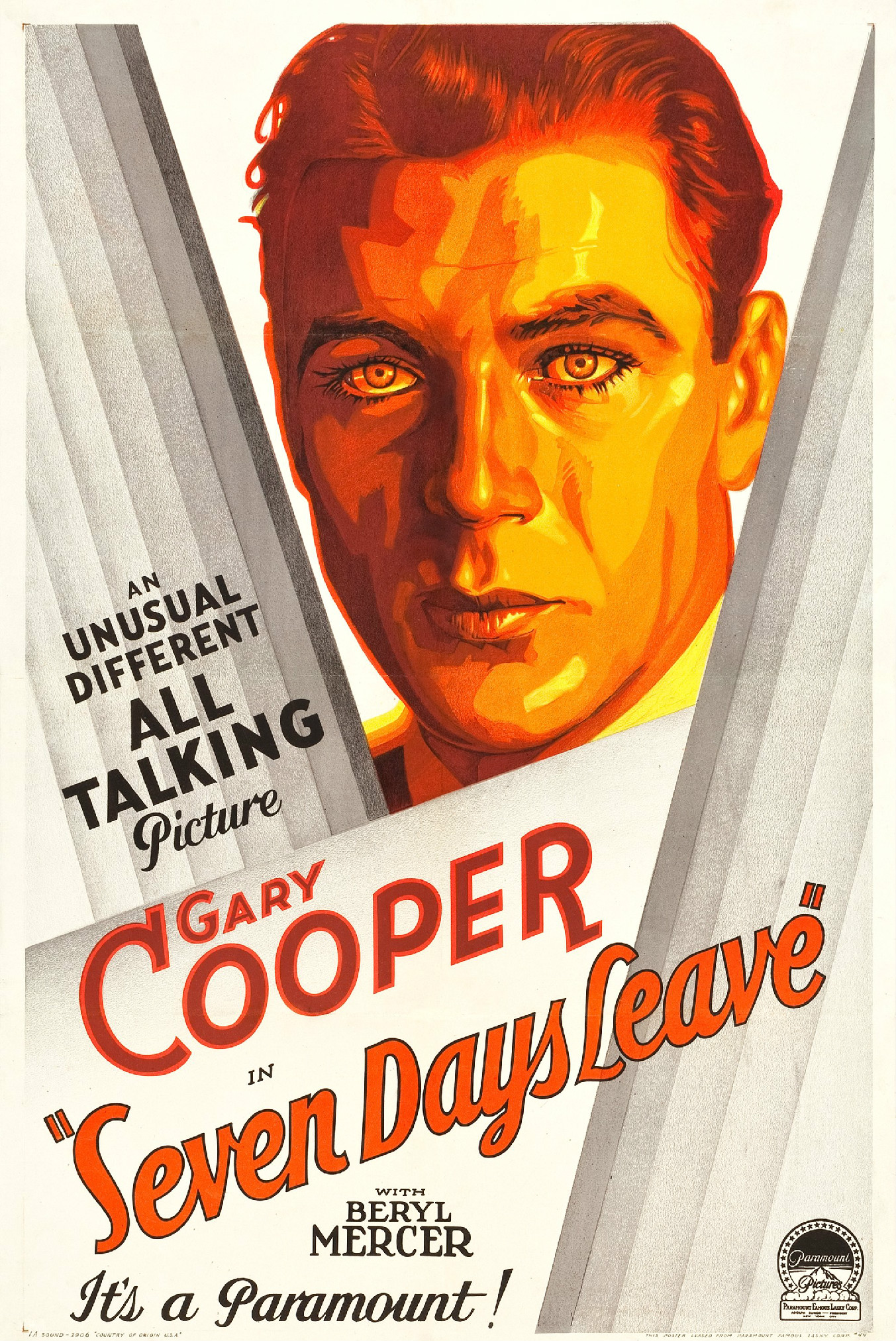
- Theatrical release poster
- Directed by: Richard Wallace
- Written by: Richard H. Digges Jr. (titles); John Farrow; Dan Totheroh
- Based on: The Old Lady Shows Her Medals; 1917 play by J. M. Barrie
- Produced by: Louis D. Lighton; Richard Wallace
- Starring: Gary Cooper; Beryl Mercer; Daisy Belmore
- Cinematography: Charles Lang
- Edited by: George Nichols Jr.
- Music by: Frank Terry
- Production company: Paramount Pictures
- Distributed by: Paramount Pictures
- Release date: January 25, 1930 (USA)
- Running time: 80 minutes 9 reels, 7,534 ft
- Country: United States
- Language: English

Seven Days Leave is a 1930 American Pre-Code drama film produced and directed by Richard Wallace and starring Gary Cooper, Beryl Mercer, and Daisy Belmore.

The film is based on the 1918 play The Old Lady Shows Her Medals by J.M. Barrie. Produced by Louis D. Lighton and Richard Wallace for Paramount Pictures, the film was released on January 25, 1930, in the United States.

== Plot ==
Seven Days Leave (1930)

A young Canadian soldier is wounded while fighting in World War I. While recovering from his wounds in London, a YMCA worker tells him that a Scottish widow without a son believes that he is in fact her son. To comfort the widow, the soldier agrees to pretend to be her Scottish son. After fighting with British sailors who make fun of his kilts, he wants to desert, but moved by his mother's patriotism he returns to the war front and is killed in battle. Later the proud Scottish widow receives the medals that her "son" was awarded for bravery.

== Cast ==
- Gary Cooper as Kenneth
- Beryl Mercer as Sarah Ann Dowey
- Daisy Belmore as Emma Mickelham
- Nora Cecil as Amelia Twymley
- Tempe Pigott as Mrs. Haggerty
- Arthur Hoyt as Mr. Willings
- Arthur Metcalfe as Colonel
- Basil Radford as Corporal
- Larry Steers as Aide-de-Camp

== Critical response ==
In his review for The New York Times, critic Mordaunt Hall described the film as a "sensitive production" that was "intensely interesting" and "tender, charming and whimsical". Hall credits the film's success to the direction of Richard Wallace and the performances of Beryl Mercer—reprising her role as the elderly charwoman in the original 1917 New York stage production—and the young Gary Cooper.

Richard Wallace ... shares the credit for this worthy adaptation of Sir James's work with Miss Mercer and Mr. Cooper, and while he is the guiding spirit of the film, there's no denying that he is fortunate in having these two players. Miss Mercer's performance is faultless. It is an achievement of the audible screen. She wins one's heart by her restrained and natural acting. She arouses smiles by Mrs. Dowey's guileless speech and by her timidity as she casts an eye on the brawny fighter, who towers above her. And there is no failing to find with Mr. Cooper's impersonation, for, as in his other films, he lends a life-like quality to the rôle. Physically, he is just the man for Private Dowey.

Hall praised Wallace's realistic depictions of London and the charwomen, and noted the Paramount audience's response of laughter and applause to several scenes. Hall also described the screen adaptation by John Farrow and Dan Totheroh as "a capital piece of work in blending the Barrie lines with scenes that were left to the imagination in the play".

== Production ==
The screenplay is based on the play The Old Lady Shows Her Medals by J. M. Barrie, which premiered in New York on May 14, 1917.

== See also ==
- List of early sound feature films (1926–1929)
