= Lena Rivers (1932 film) =

1932 film by Phil Rosen

- Directed by: Phil Rosen
- Written by: Stuart Anthony; Warren B. Duff
- Based on: Lena Rivers by Mary Jane Holmes
- Produced by: Samuel Bischoff
- Starring: Charlotte Henry
- Cinematography: Ira H. Morgan
- Edited by: Maurice Wright; Martin G. Cohn
- Distributed by: Tiffany Pictures
- Release dates: March 28, 1932; October 3, 1932 (UK)
- Running time: 67 minutes
- Country: United States
- Language: English

Lena Rivers, aka The Sin of Lena Rivers, is a 1932 American pre-Code drama film directed by Phil Rosen based on the 1856 novel by Mary Jane Holmes, which had been filmed on several occasions throughout the silent era.

== Plot ==
Lena's mother dies at her birth, and she is raised by her grandparents, Mr. and Mrs. Nichols. Lena has never known her father. When she is a teenager, Mr. Nichols dies and Lena and her grandmother go to live with her uncle and the son of the grandmother in Kentucky. John's wife, Matilda, is not at all happy about their coming, and holds it against Lena that she was born out of wedlock. John's daughter, Caroline, thinks Lena is "common" and doesn't include her socially. Upon their arrival, they meet a neighbor, Mr. Graham, who takes an obvious interest in Lena.

Mr. Graham, while showing Lena his horses, explains to her that she reminds him of a girl he was in love with a long time ago. But he lost that girl, while he was away, because she thought he had left her. Lena discovers she has a natural affinity with horses when she is able to calm a frisky horse, Brimstone. Mr. Graham gives Brimstone to Lena. Lena becomes friends with Mr. Graham's ward, Durrie.

Mr. Graham and Lena become good friends, and it turns out that Mr. Graham is Lena's father. He is afraid to tell her, because Lena has learned to hate the father whom she has never known. In order to help her financially, Mr. Graham fixes a race so that Brimstone wins. Lena's grandmother dies, leaving Lena to feel all alone. With the help of a family friend, Graham finally tells Lena the truth, and she forgives him.

== Cast ==
- Charlotte Henry as Lena Rivers
- Morgan Galloway as Durrie Belmont
- Beryl Mercer as Grandmother Nichols
- James Kirkwood as Henry R. Graham
- John St. Polis as John Nichols
- Betty Blythe as Mrs. Matilda Nichols
- Joyce Compton as Caroline Nichols
- Russell Simpson as Grandfather Nichols
- Clarence Muse as Curfew
- John Larkin as Lucifer 'Lucy' Jones
- The Kentucky Singers (the Kentucky Jubilee Singers) as choir singers
