= Charlotte Henry =

American actress (1914–1980)

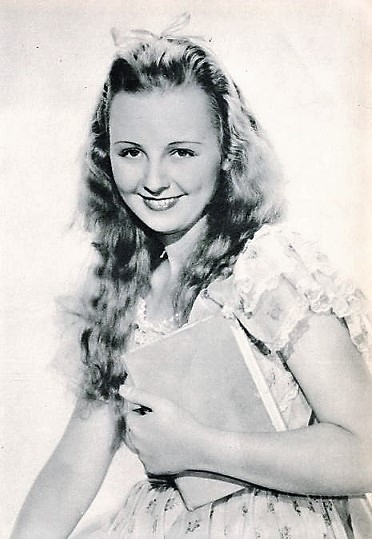
- Henry in 1934
- Born: Charlotte Virginia Henry; March 3, 1914; Brooklyn, New York, U.S.
- Died: April 11, 1980 (aged 66); La Jolla, California, U.S.
- Resting place: Holy Cross Cemetery, San Diego, California
- Occupation: Actress
- Years active: 1930–1942
- Spouse: Dr. James J. Dempsey

Charlotte Virginia Henry (March 3, 1914 – April 11, 1980) was an American actress who is best remembered for her roles in Alice in Wonderland (1933) and Babes in Toyland (1934). She also starred in the Frank Buck serial Jungle Menace (1937).

== Early years ==
Henry was born in Brooklyn, New York, to Robert Emmett Henry and Charlotte Ann Sayers Henry. She began modelling at a very young age, and was always fascinated by the theatre. At age 14, she was cast in an important role in Courage, a hit Broadway play, in 1928.

== Hollywood ==
The following year, Henry's mother brought her to Hollywood. She repeated her part in the movie version of Courage (1930) and enrolled at Lawlors, the school for professional children. Some of her classmates were Jackie Cooper, Frankie Darro, Mickey Rooney, Anita Louise, and Betty Grable. Junior Durkin, who had worked with her in Courage, suggested Henry for a play in which he was appearing at the Pasadena Playhouse. By then, she had appeared in two more feature films: Huckleberry Finn in 1931 and Lena Rivers in 1932.

Alice in Wonderland garnered unanimous praise for Henry. In 1933, she appeared in the film Man Hunt as Josie Woodward.

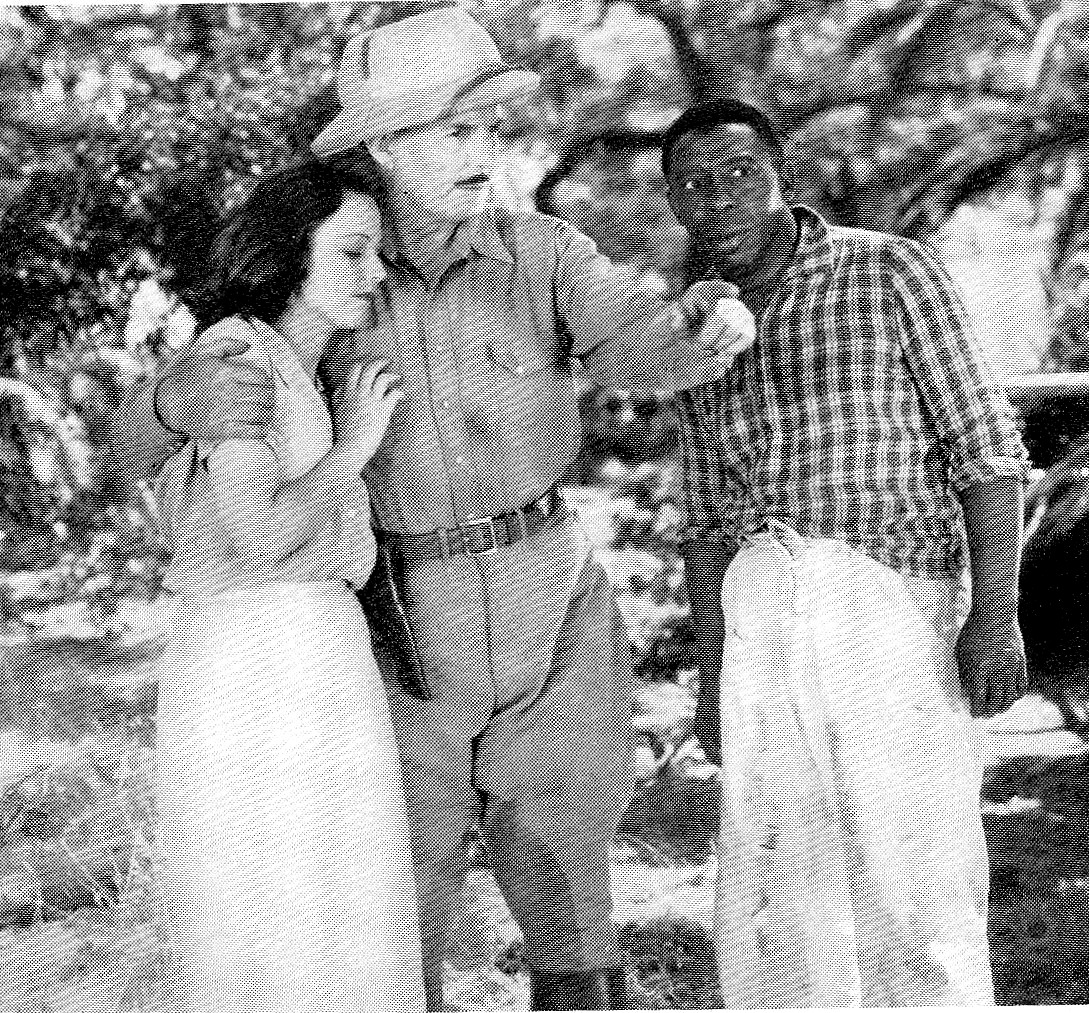
Henry with Frank Buck and Clarence Muse in Jungle Menace (1937)

== Jungle Menace ==
In his autobiography, director Harry L. Fraser described filming the scene in Jungle Menace during which a boa constrictor attacks the heroine Dorothy (Henry). The villain has tied Dorothy hand and foot and she thrashes about wildly, terrified when she suddenly sees the huge snake:

The snake was in no hurry. Slowly he slithered across the girl's body, while she screamed and struggled. He turned, looking for a spot to slip under her to make his first wrap. I motioned to the reptile crew to get ready, and a split-second later gave them the signal to move in. But now, the maddened snake fought them and did its best to coil around one of the men. Before that happened, however, I had cut, and we had a good cliff-hanger with our terror-stricken heroine to close the episode.

== Stage ==
Henry said that her success as a child actress left her "typed, definitely typed" and cited the difficulty of proving "that I am quite capable of playing serious adult parts." The resulting lack of work in films led her to act on stage in production of the Federal Theatre Project.

== Later life and death ==
Henry retired from the movies and moved from Hollywood to San Diego, where she ran an employment agency with her mother. She then became executive secretary for 15 years to the Roman Catholic Bishop of San Diego, Charles F. Buddy. She was married to Dr. James Dempsey and continued with her acting, appearing in several stage productions at the San Diego Old Globe Theatre.

Henry died of cancer at age 66 in 1980. The San Diego Union newspaper carried the obituary and noted that she was buried at Holy Cross Cemetery.

== Filmography ==
Year	Title	Role	Notes
1930	Harmony at Home	Dora Haller	
1930	Courage	Gwendolyn Colbrook	
1930	On Your Back	Belle	
1931	Huckleberry Finn	Mary Jane	
1931	Arrowsmith	The Pioneer Girl	Uncredited
1932	Forbidden	Roberta - Age 18	
1932	Murders in the Rue Morgue	Blonde Girl in Sideshow Audience	Uncredited
1932	Lena Rivers	Lena Rivers	
1932	Rebecca of Sunnybrook Farm	Emma Jane	Uncredited
1932	Rasputin and the Empress	Minor Role	Uncredited
1933	Man Hunt	Josie Woodward	
1933	Alice in Wonderland	Alice	
1934	The Last Gentleman	Marjorie Barr	
1934	The Human Side	Lucille Sheldon	
1934	Babes in Toyland	Bo-Peep	
1934	March of the Wooden Soldiers	Bo-Peep	
1935	Laddie	Shelly Stanton	
1935	The Hoosier Schoolmaster	Hannah	
1935	Forbidden Heaven	Ann, The Girl	
1935	Three Kids and a Queen	Julia Orsatti	
1936	The Return of Jimmy Valentine	Midge Davis	
1936	Hearts in Bondage	Julie Buchanan	
1936	The Gentleman from Louisiana	Linda Costigan	
1936	Charlie Chan at the Opera	Mlle. Kitty	
1936	The Mandarin Mystery	Josephine Temple	
1937	Jungle Menace	Dorothy Elliott	Serial
1937	God's Country and the Man	Betty Briggs	
1937	Young Dynamite	Jane Shields	
1941	Bowery Blitzkrieg	Mary Breslin	
1941	Flying Blind	Corenson's Secretary	
1942	She's in the Army	Helen Burke - WAC Enlistee	
1942	I Live on Danger	Nurse	(final film role)
