= For Services Rendered =

Play

First edition (publ. Heinemann)

For Services Rendered is a play by Somerset Maugham. First performed in London in 1932, the play is about the effects of World War I on an English family.

== Characters ==
- Leonard Ardsley
- Charlotte Ardsley, Leonard’s wife
- Sydney Ardsley, blinded during World War One
- Eva Ardsley
- Lois Ardsley
- Ethel Bartlett
- Howard Bartlett, Ethel’s husband
- Collie Stratton
- Wilfred Cedar
- Gwen Cedar, Wilfred’s wife
- Dr Charles Prentice, Charlotte’s brother
- Gertrude

== Synopsis ==
Set in late summer 1932 in Kent, the Ardsley family seem to be managing their lives very well following World War One and the Great Depression. In reality, each of them is fighting for survival. Leonard and Charlotte Ardsley are parents to Ethel, Eva, Sydney and Lois.

Ethel is married to a former officer, Howard Bartlett, who returns to his position as a tenant farmer after the war. His class is a source of disharmony between Ethel’s family and her husband. Howard drinks excessively and he attempts to seduce his wife’s younger sister, Lois. Although Ethel is disillusioned, she finds solace in her children. Her marriage disproves the expectation that the war would bring about better social mobility.

Sydney has been blinded in the war; his main occupation now is sitting in a chair whilst knitting. It is Sydney who speaks directly about the madness of war and its devastating effects upon his generation.

Eva is unmarried and approaching forty, martyring herself to the cause of brother, Sydney. Collie Stratton, after a lengthy period serving his country in the Navy, has invested in a motorcar repair shop. However, a naval career has left him ill-prepared to run a business and this proves his undoing. Not realizing it would be illegal, and thinking that it would buy him time to solve his cash-flow problems, Collie writes cheques to creditors despite knowing that his bank will refuse to cash them. Leonard Ardsley informs him he has broken the law and that he will be tried and imprisoned. Eva, who is in love with Collie, proposes to give him money she has saved in order to clear his debts. She asks him to become engaged to her so that he can accept the gift. Collie refuses. Facing prison and disgrace he shoots himself. On hearing of his suicide, Eva holds her family responsible because none of them offered help or support. She pretends to have been engaged to Collie. By the end of the play, Eva has entered into a delusional state, believing truly that she will soon be leaving with her fiancé, Collie.

Lois, at twenty-seven years old, is single and without a hope of finding a husband in the English backwater in which the family live. She is however receiving attention from the married Wilfred Cedar. Wilfred’s wife, Gwen, is tortured by his attraction to Lois. She sees Lois wearing a pearl necklace and despite assurances by Lois that the pearls are fake, she realises that her own husband has gifted the pearls to Lois. Gwen’s fears are later realised when, listening in on the telephone, she hears Lois agreeing to run away with Wilfred. She confronts Lois in the presence of Lois’s mother and sister and pleads with Lois to give up Wilfred, accusing all the family (who defend Lois) of wishing to bring Wilfred’s money into their family. Lois decides to keep to her plan despite Gwen's pleas, and despite the scandal it will cause, not because she loves Wilfred, but because she enjoys the power she has over Wilfred and the way she can exploit him in order to achieve material security and independence from the family.

The younger generation can no longer live their lives in the blueprint of the older generation, they must find a new way of living. England is changing, falling apart, and must begin again. Charlotte is diagnosed by her doctor brother, Charles Prentice as having an unnamed condition, probably cancer, which requires an operation and home care in order to prolong her life. Charlotte refuses treatment so that her family are not burdened with the expense but also because she feels a sense of liberation and self-possession in deciding her fate for herself. ‘I’m rather relieved to think it’s over. I’m not at home in this world of today. I’m pre-War. Everything’s so changed now. To me life is like a party that was very nice to start with but has become rather rowdy as time went on and I’m not at all sorry to go home.’

Leonard, who is oblivious to the true states of any of the members of his family ends the play with a cup of tea and a blithely optimistic speech about the future, ‘If you come to think of it we none of us have anything very much to worry about. We have our health, we have our happiness, and things haven’t been going too well lately, but I think the world is turning the corner and we can all look forward to better times in the future. This old England of ours isn’t done yet and I for one believe in it and all it stands for.’ Delusional Eva sings God Save Our King and the curtain falls.

== Original production ==
The first performance was on 1 November 1932 in the West End of London, at the Globe Theatre (later renamed the Gielgud Theatre). The cast was:

- Leonard Ardsley – C. V. France
- Charlotte Ardsley – Louise Hampton
- Sydney – Cedric Hardwicke
- Eva – Flora Robson
- Lois – Marjorie Mars
- Ethel Bartlett – Diana Hamilton
- Howard Bartlett– W. Cronin-Wilson
- Collie Stratton – Ralph Richardson
- Wilfred Cedar – S. J. Warmington
- Gwen Cedar – Marda Vanne
- Dr Prentice – David Hawthorne

Source: The Times.

The director was Barry Jackson. The play's run at the Globe finished on 17 December 1932, and it transferred to the Queen's Theatre from 2 January 1933.

== Revivals ==
One of the earliest revivals of this play was the performances in 1946 at the New Lindsey Theatre in London, directed by Peter Cotes. A TV adaptation (from Granada Television, directed by Henry Kaplan) was broadcast in 1959. The later revivals of this play include performances at the Northcott Theatre in 1974, performances at the Royal National Theatre in London in 1979, and performances at the Old Vic Theatre in London in 1993. The 1993 revival, initially performed at the Salisbury Playhouse, was presented by Deborah Paige, and the cast included Sylvia Syms and Jeffrey Segal. More recent revivals were performed at the Watermill Theatre in Berkshire in 2007, the Union Theatre in 2011, and the Chichester Festival Theatre in 2015. A new performance for the London stage is at Jermyn Street Theatre from 6 September to 5 October 2019.

== Criticism ==
The anti-war message was not popular with audiences, and the play only ran for 78 performances. The play is mentioned in the context of other plays inspired by the Great War in "A Wounded Stage: Drama and World War I", a 2006 book chapter by Mary Luckhurst, and in British Theatre between the Wars, 1918–1939 (2000) by Clive Barker. In the latter, Barker calls the play a "masterpiece of textured dramaturgy", while noting that it was a "categorical failure". For Services Rendered is compared to contemporary plays in Modern British Drama: The Twentieth Century (2002) by Christopher D. Innes, where Innes says the play was "a counterblast to Noel Coward's Cavalcade". ‘The play is particularly extraordinary viewed in retrospect as the lessons of World War One are written so clearly across the lives of the characters who, less than a decade later, would find themselves at war again.’

== See also ==
- List of plays with anti-war themes
