= Forbidden Heaven =

1935 film by Reginald Barker

- Directed by: Reginald Barker
- Screenplay by: Sada Cowan; Jefferson Parker
- Story by: Christine Jope-Slade
- Produced by: Trem Carr
- Starring: Charles Farrell; Charlotte Henry; Beryl Mercer
- Cinematography: Milton R. Krasner
- Edited by: Jack Ogilvie
- Production company: Republic Pictures
- Distributed by: Republic Pictures
- Release date: October 5, 1935
- Running time: 68 minutes
- Country: United States
- Language: English

Forbidden Heaven is a 1935 American drama film directed by Reginald Barker and starring Charles Farrell, Charlotte Henry and Beryl Mercer. The film was the first original production by Republic Pictures, which had previously distributed films produced by its predecessor companies such as Majestic and Liberty Pictures. It was shot at the Culver Studios of RKO.

== Plot ==
A young American girl in London in the midst of the Great Depression attempts to commit suicide by drowning herself in Hyde Park. She is rescued by a trio of homeless park-dwellers who nurse her back to health. One of them, Archer, is an aspiring politician; he and Ann fall in love as they all look for work.

== Cast ==
- Charles Farrell as Mr. Archer / Nibs
- Charlotte Henry as Ann
- Beryl Mercer as Agnes
- Fred Walton as Pluffy
- Eric Wilton as Warren Radford
- Phyllis Barry as Sybil Radford
- Eric Snowden as Speaker
- Barry Winton as Allen

== Critical reception ==
A reviewer in Variety wrote, "The attempt to recall Seventh Heaven, both in the title and some of the plot material, is obvious."
