= Dudley Digges (actor) =

Irish actor (1879–1947)

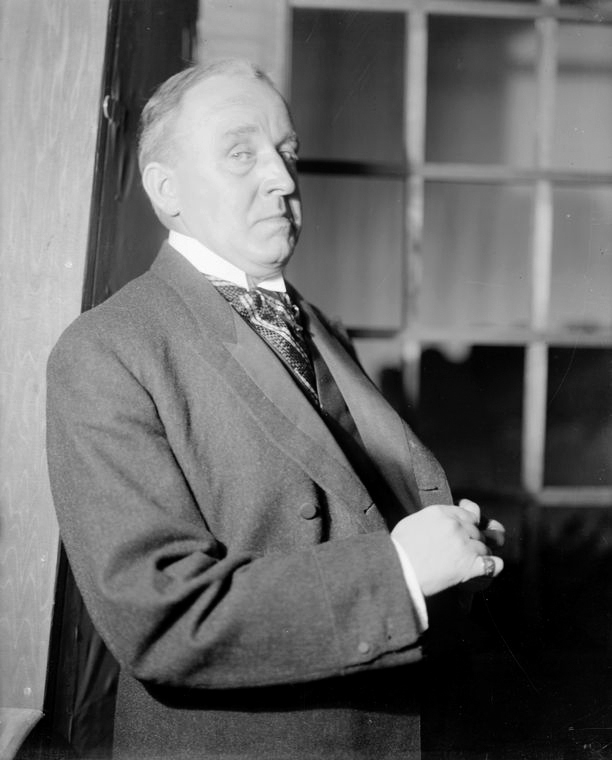
- Digges as Boss Mangan in the 1920 Broadway production Heartbreak House, which he also directed
- Born: John Dudley Digges; 9 June 1879; Dublin, Ireland
- Died: 24 October 1947 (aged 68); New York City, New York, U.S.
- Occupations: Actor, theatre director, producer
- Spouse(s): Maire Quinn (m. 1907-1947; her death)

John Dudley Digges (9 June 1879 – 24 October 1947) was an Irish actor, stage director, and producer. Although he gained his initial theatre training and acting experience in Ireland, the vast majority of Digges' career was spent in the United States, where over the span of 43 years he worked in hundreds of stage productions and performed in over 50 films.

== Early life and stage work in Ireland ==
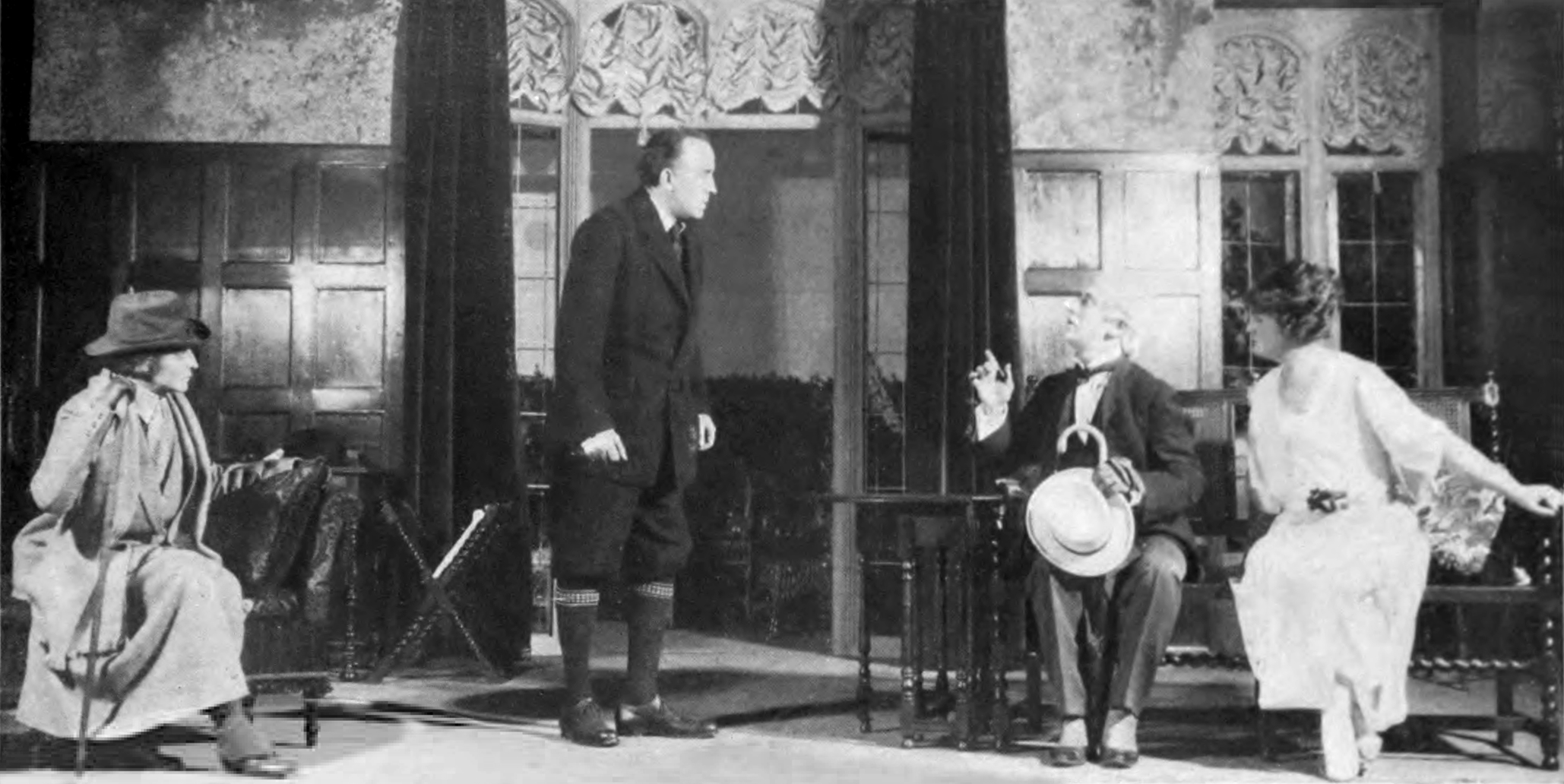
Digges (standing) in the 1921 Broadway production Mr. Pim Passes By, along with (from left) Helen Westley, Erskine Sanford, and Laura Hope Crews

Digges was born in the Ranelagh area of Dublin in 1879, the child of James Digges and Catherine Forsythe. He became acquainted with theatre directors William and Frank Fay and took an interest in acting. He joined W. G. Fay's Irish National Dramatic Company, along with others such as Máire Nic Shiubhlaigh, James H. Cousins, Fred Ryan and Maire Quinn (who became his wife). Their first production, Cathleen Ni Houlihan, with Maud Gonne in the lead role, and Déirdre, was on 2 April 1902. The company, which had no funds to speak of, acquired a couple of bare rooms at 34 Lower Camden Street, which with the help of friends from Irish-revival societies they turned into a small theatre. However, this proved too small for the plays they were planning to stage. They rehearsed at the Coffee Palace in Westmoreland Street and also used the Molesworth Hall for productions.

In 1903 the playwrights and most of the actors and staff from these productions went on to form the Irish National Theatre Society, which had its registered offices in Camden Street. The society founded the Abbey Theatre.

== Career in the United States ==
Digges went to America with a group of fellow-actors in 1904, and became successful as both actor and producer. He was stage manager for a time to both Charles Frohman and George Arliss, and by the 1920s he had become a notable performer on Broadway. One of Digges' best-known roles there was as Ficsur in the original 1921 production of Ferenc Molnár's Liliom (later adapted into the musical Carousel by Rodgers and Hammerstein). In 1924, in Woodstock, New York, he founded the Maverick Theater with the assistance of Hervey White, who had established the Maverick Arts Colony. Digges was also artistic director of a company that included Helen Hayes and Edward G. Robinson.

Digges expanded his career into films by 1929, and over nearly two decades he performed in more than 50 films, including the original pre-Code adaptation of The Maltese Falcon (1931). Digges was cast in that feature as Casper Gutman, the character later portrayed by Sydney Greenstreet in the 1941 version. In The Invisible Man (1933) he played the Chief Detective who plots to capture the title character, opposite the unseen Claude Rains. He played the role of the Heavenly Examiner in both the original Broadway production and the 1930 screen version of Sutton Vane's Outward Bound. He also worked as a director on Broadway.

== Personal life and death ==
Digges married only once, to Irish actress Maire Quinn. The couple wed on August 27, 1907 in New York City and remained together until Maire's death in August 1947. In New York on October 24—just two months after his wife's death—Digges died of a stroke in his Manhattan apartment at 1 West 64th Street. He was survived by three siblings, all living in Ireland: a sister, Mrs. Mai Gannen, and two brothers, James and Ernst. Following a requiem mass at Blessed Sacrament Roman Catholic Church on October 28, he was buried next to Quinn at Gate of Heaven Cemetery in Hawthorne, New York.

== Partial filmography ==
- Condemned (1929) - Jean Vidal
- Outward Bound (1930) - Thompson the Examiner
- The Maltese Falcon (1931) - Casper Gutman
- Alexander Hamilton (1931) - Senator Timothy Roberts
- Devotion (1931) - Sergeant Coggins
- The Ruling Voice (1931) - Abner Sneed
- The Hatchet Man (1932) - Nog Hong Fah
- The Strange Case of Clara Deane (1932) - Detective Garrison
- Roar of the Dragon (1932) - Johnson
- The First Year (1932) - Dr. Anderson
- Tess of the Storm Country (1932) - Capt. Howland
- The King's Vacation (1933) - Count Raven Lord Chamberlain
- The Silk Express (1933) - Professor Axel Nyberg
- The Mayor of Hell (1933) - Thompson
- The Narrow Corner (1933) - Doctor Saunders
- Before Dawn (1933) - Horace Merrick
- The Emperor Jones (1933) - Smithers
- Fury of the Jungle (1933) - 'Doc' Parrish
- The Invisible Man (1933) - Chief Detective
- Massacre (1934) - Elihu P. Quissenberry
- Caravan (1934) - Estate Administrator
- The World Moves On (1934) - Mr. Manning
- What Every Woman Knows (1934) - James Wylie
- I Am a Thief (1934) - Col. Jackson
- A Notorious Gentleman (1935) - Marleybone
- China Seas (1935) - Dawson
- The Bishop Misbehaves (1935) - 'Red'
- Mutiny on the Bounty (1935) - Bacchus
- Kind Lady (1935) - Mr. Edwards
- Three Live Ghosts (1936) - Inspector Briggs
- The Voice of Bugle Ann (1936) - Jacob Terry
- The Unguarded Hour (1936) - Metford
- The General Died at Dawn (1936) - Mr. Wu
- Valiant Is the Word for Carrie (1936) - Dennis Ringrose
- Love Is News (1937) - Cyrus Jeffrey
- Raffles (1939) - MacKenzie
- The Light That Failed (1939) - The Nilghai
- The Fight for Life (1940) - Head Doctor
- Son of Fury: The Story of Benjamin Blake (1942) - Pratt
- The Searching Wind (1946) - Moses (final film role)
