= Beryl Mercer =

Spanish-American actress (1882–1939)

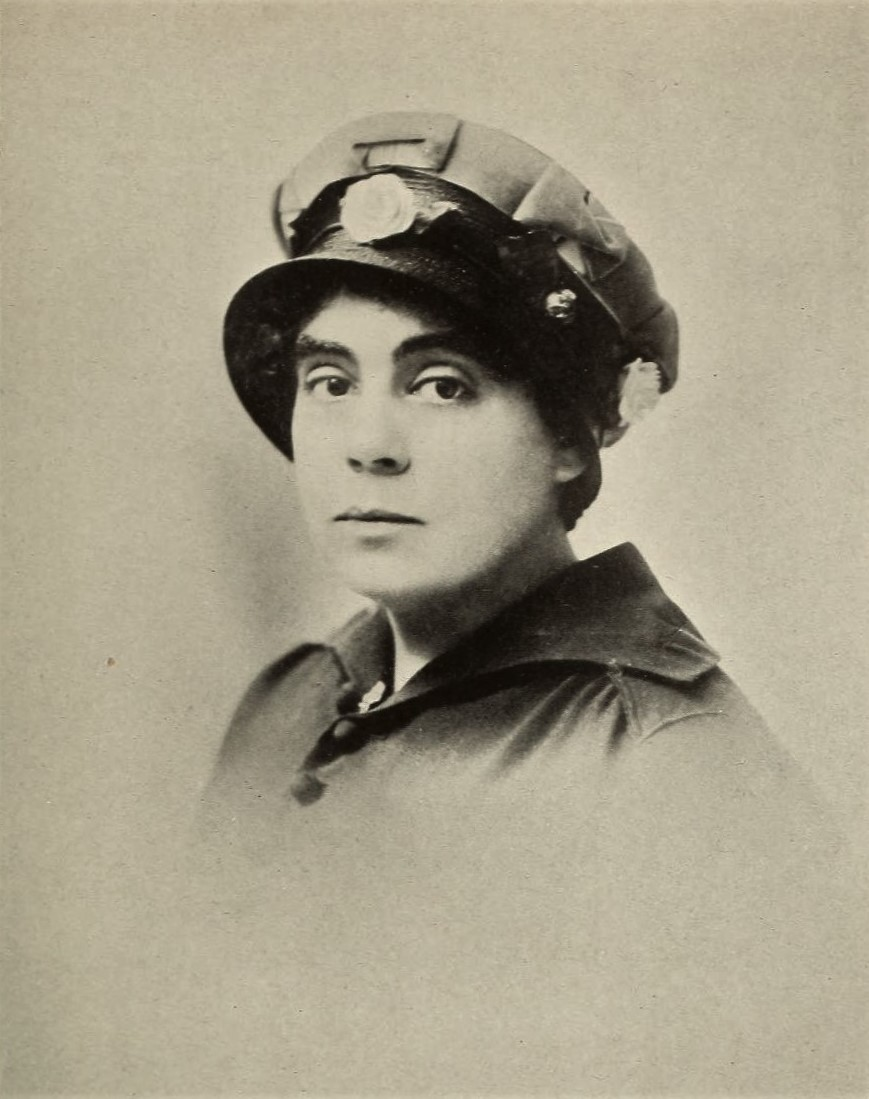
- Mercer in 1918
- Born: August 13, 1882; Seville, Spain
- Died: July 28, 1939 (aged 56); Santa Monica, California, U.S.
- Resting place: Forest Lawn Memorial Park
- Occupation: Actress
- Years active: 1916–1939
- Spouse(s): Maitland Paisley (m. 1896; div. 1909) Holmes Herbert (m. 1909; div. 19??)
- Children: 1

Beryl Mercer (August 13, 1882 – July 28, 1939) was a Spanish-born British-American actress of stage and screen long based in the United States.

== Early years ==
Beryl Mercer was born to British parents in Seville on August 13, 1882. Her father was Edward Sheppard Mercer, said to be Spanish despite his name, and her mother was actress Effie Martin. (Note: The reference work An Encyclopedic Dictionary of Women in Early American Films: 1895-1930 says of Mercer, "... her mother was the famed actor Beryl Montague.")

== Career ==
She became a child actress, making her debut on August 14, 1886, at the Theatre Royal, Great Yarmouth, when she was age 4 and returned to the stage when she was ten. In London, she appeared in The Darling of the Gods and the production by Oscar Asche of A Midsummer Night's Dream. In 1906 she appeared as a Kaffir slave in the West End play The Shulamite. She travelled with this play to the United States, where she received good reviews. That 1906 play marked her Broadway debut.

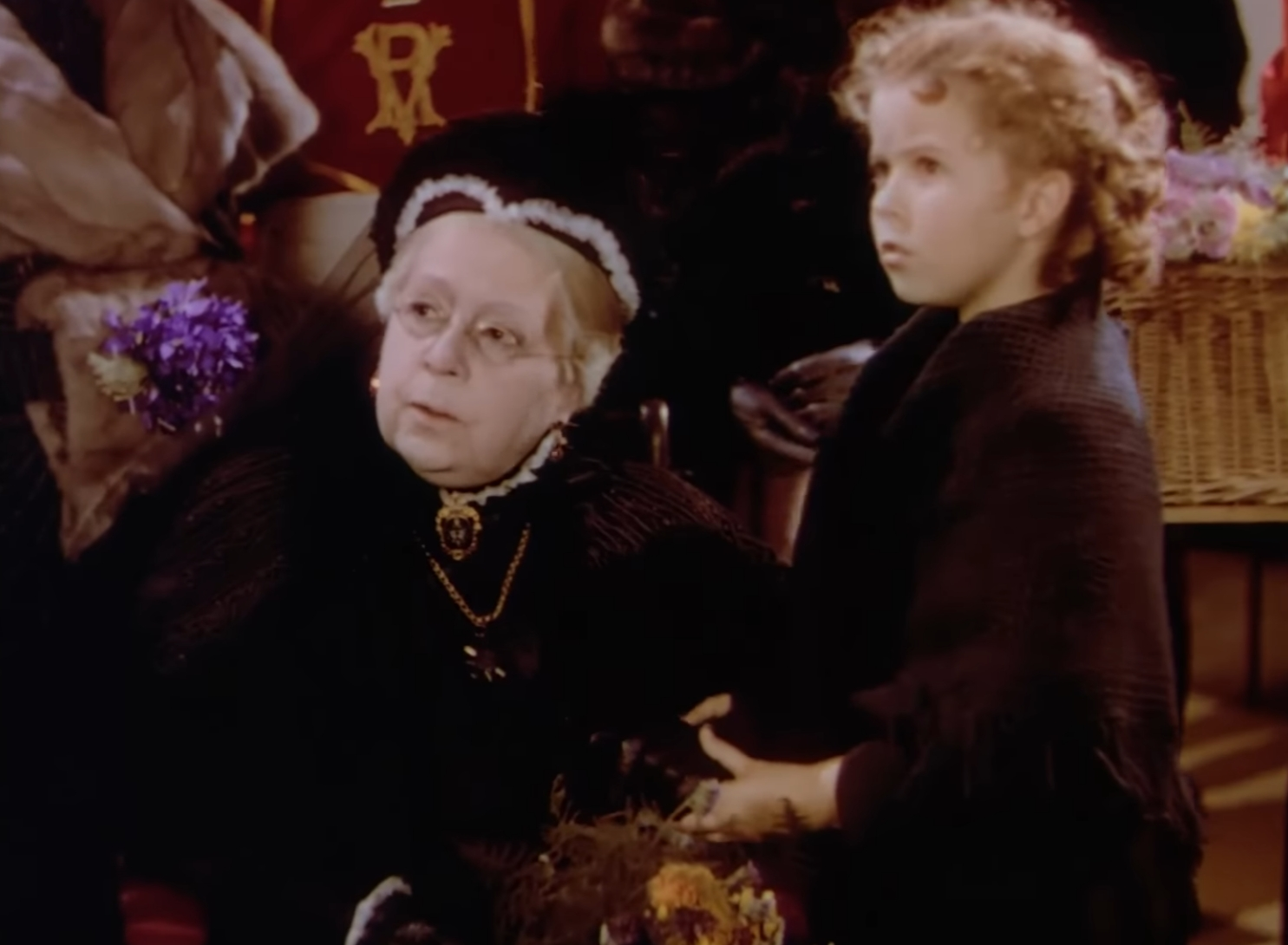
Mercer with Shirley Temple in The Little Princess (1939)

Mercer was honored by Dowager Queen Alexandra for her work as an entertainer during World War I.

Mercer's film debut came in The Christian. She was best known as a film actress for her motherly roles. She played Lew Ayres' mother in All Quiet on the Western Front (1930) and James Cagney's mother in The Public Enemy (1931) as Ma Powers. She also regularly appeared as a grandmother, cook or maid in some high-profile films. She appeared in more than 50 films between 1916 and 1939, and her career was at a peak in the 1930s when she regularly appeared in several films per year. Mercer appeared in Cavalcade (1933), Jane Eyre, The Little Minister, and The Richest Girl in the World (all 1934). She was in two versions of Three Live Ghosts (1929 and 1935) and The Little Princess (1939) as Queen Victoria.

== Personal life ==
Mercer was married to Maitland Paisley early in her life. Her only other marriage was to actor Holmes Herbert in the late 1920s. She had one child, Joan Mercer, later Bitting, born on 16 September 1917.

== Death ==
On July 28, 1939, Mercer died in Santa Monica, California, aged 56, following surgery for an undisclosed ailment. She was buried in Forest Lawn Memorial Park in Glendale, California.

== Filmography ==
- The Shulamite (1915)
- The Final Curtain (1916) – Mary
- Broken Chains (1922) – Mrs. Mulcahy
- The Christian (1923) – Liza
- We Americans (1928) – Mrs. Levine
- Mother's Boy (1929) – Mrs.O'Day
- Three Live Ghosts (1929) – Mrs. Gubbins
- Seven Days' Leave (1930) – Sarah Ann Dowey
- All Quiet on the Western Front (1930) – Paul's Mother
- Dumbbells in Ermine (1930) – Grandma Corey
- In Gay Madrid (1930) – Doña Concha
- Common Clay (1930) – Mrs. Neal
- The Matrimonial Bed (1930) – Corinne
- An Intimate Dinner in Celebration of Warner Bros. Silver Jubilee (1930, Short) – Mrs. Warner Bros. Pictures
- Outward Bound (1930) – Mrs. Midget
- Inspiration (1931) – Marthe, Yvonne's Maid
- East Lynne (1931) – Joyce
- The Public Enemy (1931) – Ma Powers (Tom's Mother)
- The Sky Spider (1931) – Mother Morgan
- The Man in Possession (1931) – Mrs. Dabney
- The Miracle Woman (1931) – Mrs. Higgins
- Merely Mary Ann (1931) – Mrs. Leadbatter
- Are These Our Children (1931) – Mrs. Martin – Eddie's Grandma
- Forgotten Women (1931) – Fern Madden
- Lovers Courageous (1932) – Mrs. Smith
- Devil's Lottery (1932) – Mrs. Mary Ann Meech
- Lena Rivers (1932) – Grandmother Nichols
- Young America (1932) – Grandma Beamish
- Unholy Love (1932) – Mrs. Cawley
- No Greater Love (1932) – Mrs. Burns
- Midnight Morals (1932) – Mother O'Brien, the Prison Matron
- Smilin' Through (1932) – Mrs. Crouch
- Six Hours to Live (1932) – The Widow
- Cavalcade (1933) – Cook
- Her Splendid Folly (1933) – Mrs. McAllister
- Supernatural (1933) – Madame Gourjan, Paul's Landlady
- Blind Adventure (1933) – Elsie
- Berkeley Square (1933) – Mrs. Barwick
- Broken Dreams (1933) – Mom
- Change of Heart (1934) – Harriet Hawkins
- Jane Eyre (1934) – Mrs. Fairfax
- The Richest Girl in the World (1934) – Marie
- The Little Minister (1934) – Margaret
- Age of Indiscretion (1935) – Mrs. Williams
- Forbidden Heaven (1935) – Agnes, 'The Duchess'
- Hitch Hike Lady (1935) – Mrs. Bayne
- Magnificent Obsession (1935) – Mrs. Eden
- Three Live Ghosts (1936) – Mrs. Gibbins
- My Marriage (1936) – Mrs. Dolan
- Call It a Day (1937) – Mrs. Elkins, the Cook
- Night Must Fall (1937) – Saleslady
- The Little Princess (1939) – Queen Victoria
- The Hound of the Baskervilles (1939) – Mrs. Jennifer Mortimer
- The Story of Alexander Graham Bell (1939) – Queen Victoria
- A Woman Is the Judge (1939) – Mrs. Butler (final film role)
