= Denis Dowling Mulcahy =

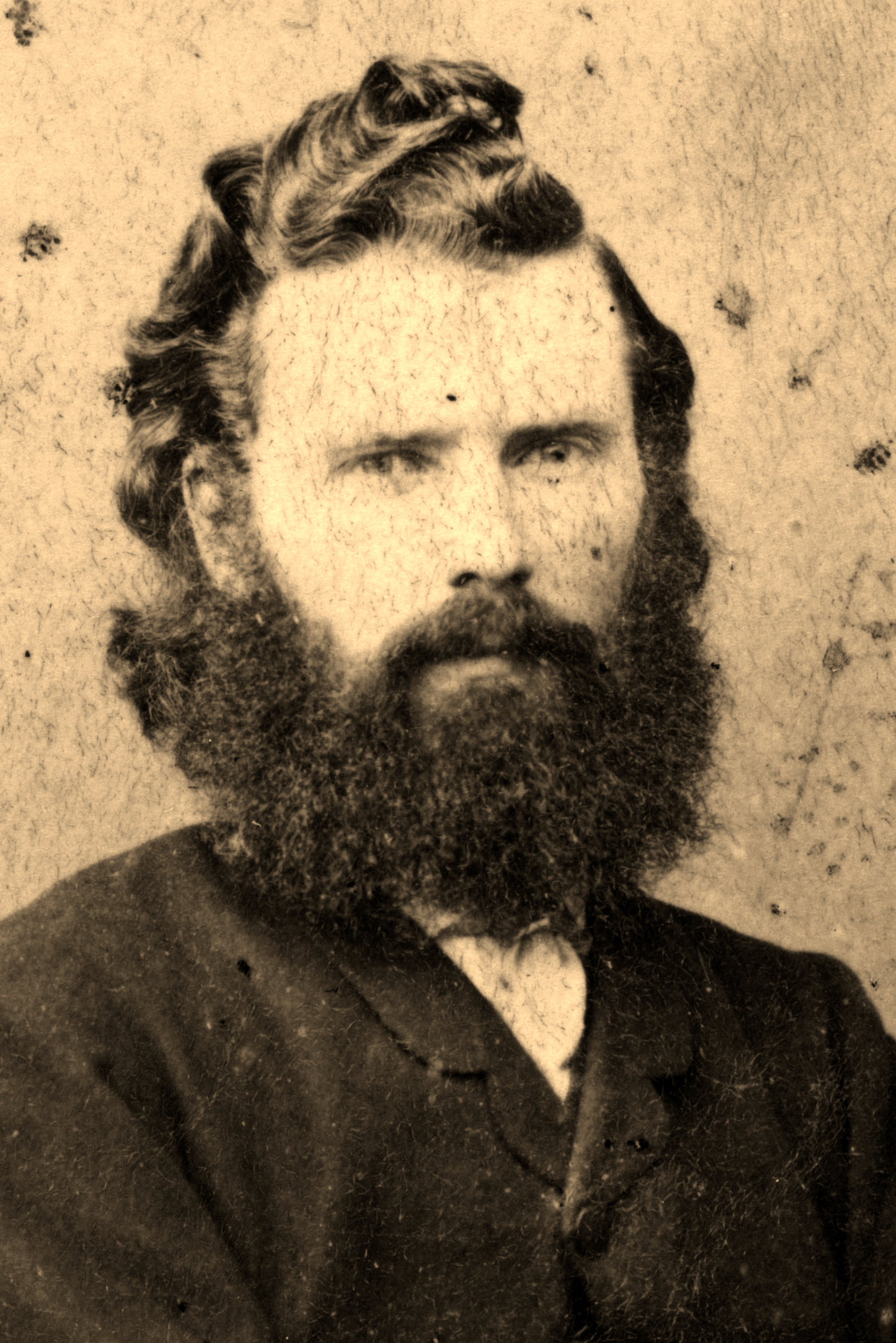
- Mulcahy, c. 1860s
- Born: c. 1833; Redmondstown, County Tipperary, Ireland
- Died: 13 September 1900 (aged 66–67); Newark, New Jersey, United States
- Organization: Irish Republican Brotherhood

Denis Dowling Mulcahy (c. 1833 - 13 September 1900) was a leading member of the Irish Republican Brotherhood and a medical doctor.

== Early life ==
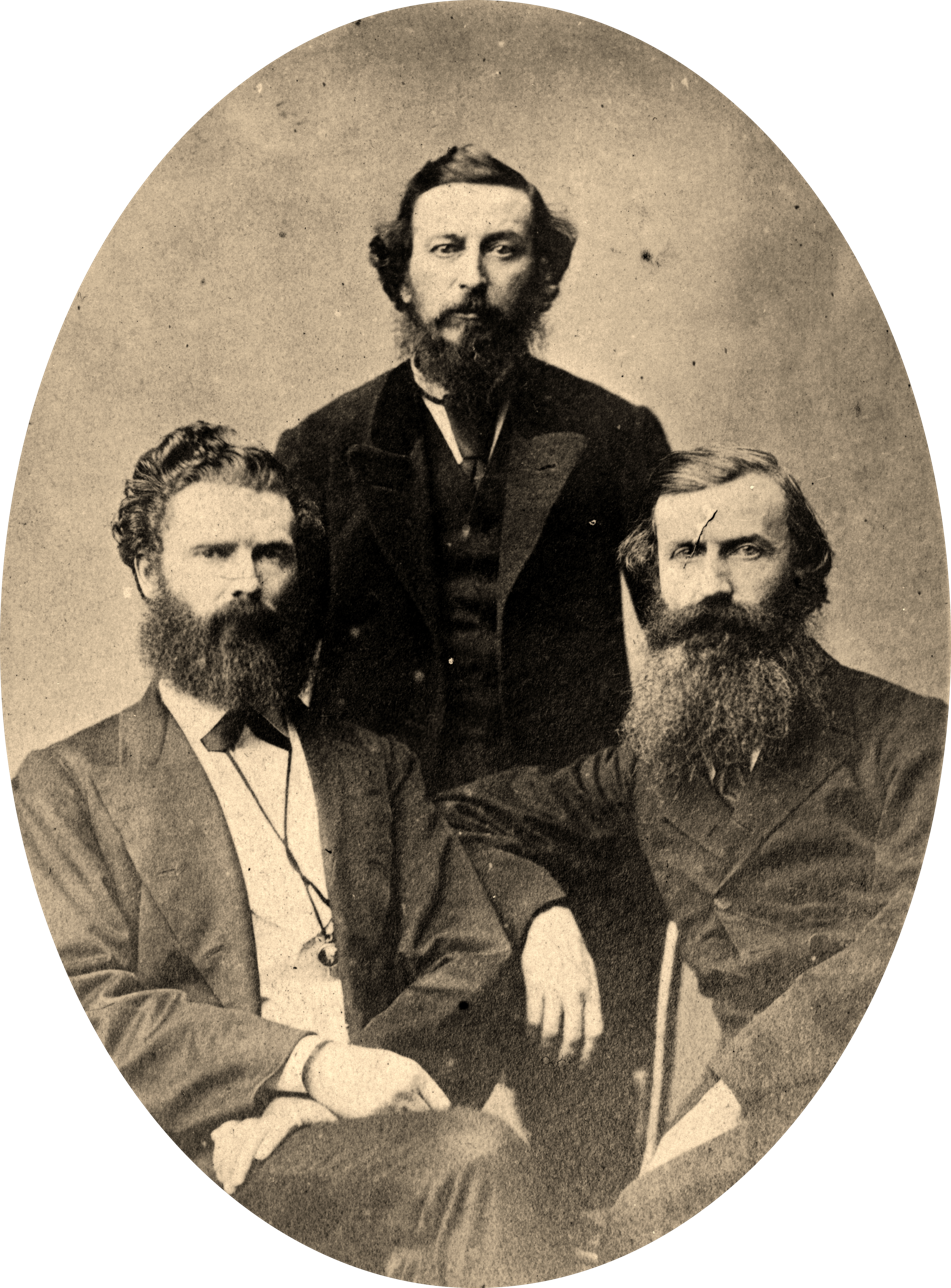
Denis Dowling Mulcahy with fellow Irish Republicans Thomas Clarke Luby and John O'Leary

He was born in Redmondstown, County Tipperary, Ireland and later lived at Powerstown, near Clonmel. His father had been a supporter of the Young Ireland rising of 1848, and later a supporter of James Stephens, one of the most prominent Fenians of the era.

== Joining The Irish People ==
He joined the staff of The Irish People, which was launched by James Stephens on 28 November 1863, with financing from the Irish Republican Brotherhood in the United States. The offices were established at 12 Parliament Street in Dublin. His colleagues on the paper were Charles Kickham and Thomas Clarke Luby, while John O'Leary was in charge of the editorial department. O’Donovan Rossa and James O’Connor had charge of the business office, with John Haltigan being the printer.

James Stephens entrusted to Luby a document containing secret resolutions on the Committee of Organization or Executive of the IRB. This document would later form the basis of the prosecution against the staff of the Irish People.

== Arrest and Imprisonment ==
On 15 July 1865 American-made plans for a rising in Ireland were discovered when the emissary lost them at Kingstown railway station. Superintendent Daniel Ryan, head of G Division of the DMP, with this and additional information, raided the offices of the Irish People on 15 September and arrested the staff. Mulcahy was tried and sentenced to a term of penal servitude. He served his term in Portland and Millbank Prisons. Certified for hard labour, he fell ill and was diagnosed with haemoptysis, or haemorrhaging of the lungs, but was nevertheless kept at hard labour when he was transferred to Dartmoor prison in the winter of 1867. After three weeks he began haemorrhaging again and was then sent to Woking invalid prison. He did not serve his full sentence as in December 1870 Fenian prisoners were granted amnesty on condition of expatriation from the UK for the term of their original sentences. Mulcahy made a plea of mitigation from exile on the grounds that he was the sole means of support for his ageing father. The plea was rejected and so Mulcahy immigrated to France for two years. In January 1871 Mulcahy sailed to New York City on the SS Russia with eight other released Fenians. During his time in prison, his fiancée left him for another Fenian, Francis Frederick Millen.

== Life in New York and New Jersey ==
In New York Mulcahy set about creating a directory of Irish political exiles, hoping to unite all the various Irish organisations in the city under one united banner. On 6 February 1877 Mulcahy discovered the former head of the American Fenian Brotherhood, John O'Mahony, dying in a New York garret and despite his best efforts, he was unable to save his life. Mulcahy subsequently accomplished O'Mahony's body back to Ireland, where he was laid to rest in Glasnevin Cemetery. Mulcahy later lamented in a written piece for the Nation reporting upon the well-attended funeral that "we seem to set more value on the dead patriot's bones than on his living brains".

There was much fallout from Mulcahy's returning of O'Mahoney to Ireland; Mulcahy had been told by Jeremiah O'Donovan Rossa that the Fenian Brotherhood would pay him $1,000 to cover the cost of the expense of the trip, however, he only received $537. Mulcahy later sued the Fenian Brotherhood for the remainder, but they protested that they could not be held responsible for Rossa's promises. The court ruled against Mulcahy in January 1894. The case soured the opinion of the leader of Clan na Gael John Devoy on Mulcahy, but John O'Leary continued to hold him in high regards.

Mulcahy opposed the "New Departure", a movement that sought to unite physical force Republicans with constitutionalists such as the Irish Parliamentary Party. Mulcahy was suspicious of Charles Stewart Parnell, who he feared had dictatorial ambitions.

Mulcahy spent the last years of life prospering; he ran a successful medical practice in Newark, New Jersey and it was there he died on 13 September 1900.
