= Thomas Clarke Luby =

Irish revolutionary

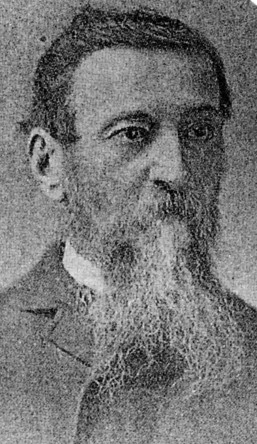
- Born: 16 January 1822; Dublin, Ireland
- Died: 29 November 1901 (aged 79); Jersey City, New Jersey, United States
- Resting place: Bay View Cemetery
- Education: Trinity College Dublin
- Occupations: Author, journalist and revolutionary
- Organization: Irish Republican Brotherhood
- Movement: Repeal Association; Young Irelanders
- Relatives: Thomas Luby (Uncle)

Thomas Clarke Luby (16 January 1822 – 29 November 1901) was an Irish revolutionary, author, journalist and one of the founding members of the Irish Republican Brotherhood.

== Early life ==
Luby was born in Dublin, the son of a Church of Ireland clergyman from Templemore in County Tipperary, his mother being a Catholic. His uncle was Dr. Thomas Luby, mathematician, Professor of Greek and a Fellow and Dean of Trinity College Dublin. Dr. Luby according to Desmond Ryan was a true Tory, who was much distracted by his nephew's political wildness. He was educated at Trinity where he studied Law and put in the necessary number of terms in London and Dublin where he acquired a reputation as a scholar and took his degree, and would go on to teach at the college for a time.

== Politics ==
Luby supported the Repeal Association, and contributed to The Nation newspaper. After the breach with Daniel O'Connell he joined the Young Irelanders in the Irish Confederation. Luby was deeply influenced by James Fintan Lalor at this time. Following the suppression of the 1848 rebellion he with Lalor and Philip Gray attempted to revive the fighting in 1849 as members of the secret Irish Democratic Association, this too, was to end in failure.

In 1851 Luby travelled to France, where he hoped to join the French Foreign Legion to learn infantry tactics but found the recruiting temporarily suspended. From France he went to Australia for a year before returning to Ireland. From the end of 1855 he edited the Tribune newspaper founded by John E. Pigot who had been a member of the Nation group. The spirit of the paper was that of the Nation, which had converted him to a revolutionary nationalist, with a leaning towards both Mitchel and Lalor. During this time he had remained in touch with the small group of '49 men including Philip Gray and attempting to start a new revolutionary movement.

Luby's views on social issues had grown more conservative after 1848 which he made clear to James Stephens whom he had met in 1856. However, on several journeys through the country with Stephens he was thoroughly won over by his colleague's ability and success as an organiser. In January 1857 both Stephens and Luby attended the funeral of Philip Gray in County Meath. At the service, Stephens insisted that Luby give the oration, which later Luby regarded as a poor and halting attempt.

== Irish Republican Brotherhood ==
In the autumn of 1857 Owen Considine arrived with a message signed by four Irish exiles in the United States, two of whom were John O'Mahony and Michael Doheny. The message conveyed the confidence they had in Stephens and asking him to establish an organisation in Ireland to win national independence. Considine also carried a private letter from O'Mahony to Stephens which was a warning, and which was overlooked by Luby and Stephens at the time. Both believed that there was a strong organisation behind the letter, only later to find it was rather a number of loosely linked groups. On 23 December Stephens dispatched Joseph Denieffe to America with his reply which was disguised as a business letter, and dated and addressed from Paris. In his reply Stephens outlined his conditions and his requirements from the organisation in America.

On 17 March 1858, Denieffe arrived in Dublin with the acceptance of Stephens' terms by the New York Committee and the eighty pounds. Denieffe's report that there was no actual organised body of sympathizers in New York but merely a loose knot of associates. Disturbed, Stephens went ahead regardless, and that very evening the Irish Republican Brotherhood was established, in Peter Langan's timber-yard in Lombard Street. Luby's description of the event in a letter to John O'Leary in 1890 was that immediately after the return of Denieffe, "at once Stephens began organizing. I had already made some provisional trips into Meath county; but 'twas on Patrick's Day 1858, that the I.R.B. movement was formally commenced. I drew up the form of oath, under Stephens' correction, in his room at Dennelly's, in the street behind and parallel to Lombard Street. The first text had clauses of secrecy and of obedience to all commands of superior officers not immoral. I swore Stephens in and he swore me." The original I.R.B. oath, as quoted by Luby and O'Leary, and which is among several versions in Stephens's own papers, ran:

I, AB., do solemnly swear, in the presence of Almighty God, that I will do my utmost, at every risk, while life lasts, to make [ other versions, according to Luby, establish in'] Ireland an independent Democratic Republic; that I will yield implicit obedience, in all things not contrary to the law of God [ 'laws of morality'] to the commands of my superior officers; and that I shall preserve inviolable secrecy regarding all the transactions [ 'affairs'] of this secret society that may be confided in me. So help me God! Amen.

This oath was significantly revised by Stephens in Paris in the summer of 1859. He asked Luby to draw up a new text, omitting the secrecy clause. The omitting of the secrecy clause was outlined in a letter from Stephens to O'Mahony on 6 April 1859 and the reasons for it. Henceforth,' wrote Luby to O'Leary "we denied that we were technically a secret body. We called ourselves a military organization; with, so to speak, a legionary oath like all soldiers."

The revised oath ran:

I, A.B, in the presence of Almighty God, do solemnly swear allegiance to the Irish Republic, now virtually established; and that I will do my very utmost, at every risk, while life lasts, to defend its independence and integrity; and, finally, that I will yield implicit obedience in all things, not contrary to the laws of God [or 'the laws of morality'], to the commands of my superior officers. So help me God. Amen'.

== Irish People newspaper ==
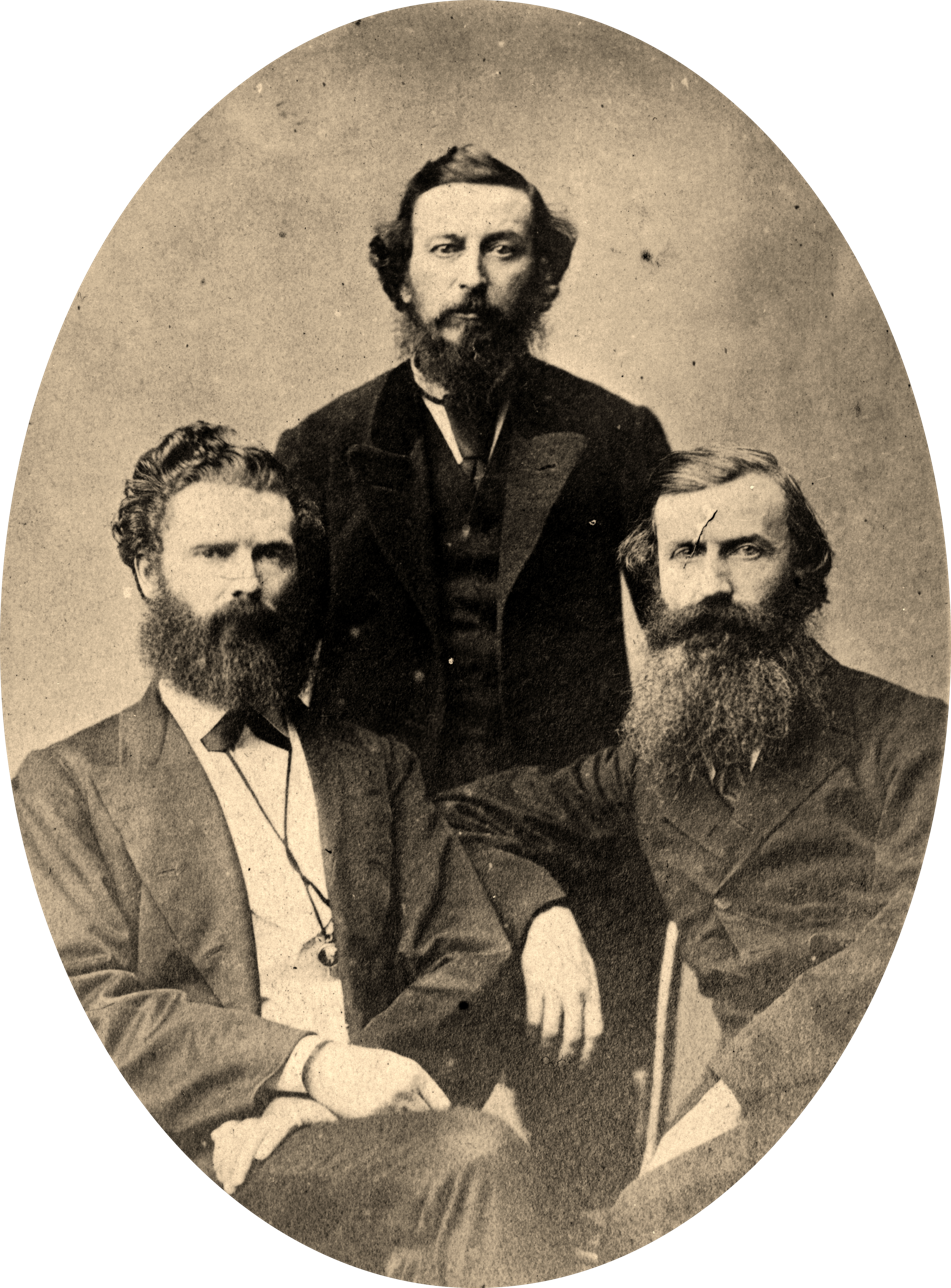
Denis Dowling Mulcahy, Thomas Clarke Luby and John O'Leary

In mid-1863 Stephens informed his colleagues he wished to start a newspaper, with financial aid from O'Mahony and the Fenian Brotherhood in America. The offices were established at 12 Parliament Street, almost at the gates of Dublin Castle. The first number of The Irish people appeared on 28 November 1863. The staff of the paper along with Luby were Kickham and Denis Dowling Mulcahy as the editorial staff. O'Donovan Rossa and James O'Connor had charge of the business office, with John Haltigan being the printer. John O'Leary was brought from London to take charge in the role of Editor. Shortly after the establishment of the paper, Stephens departed on an America tour, and to attend to organizational matters. Before leaving, he entrusted to Luby a document containing secret resolutions on the Committee of Organization or Executive of the IRB. Though Luby intimated its existence to O'Leary, he did not inform Kickham as there seemed no necessity. This document would later form the basis of the prosecution against the staff of the Irish People. The document read:

EXECUTIVE

I hereby appoint Thomas Clarke Luby, John O'Leary and Charles J. Kickham, a Committee of Organization or Executive, with the same supreme control over the Home Organization (Ireland, England, Scotland, etc.) I have exercised myself. I further empower them to appoint a Committee of Military Inspection, and a Committee of Appeal and Judgment, the functions of which Committee will be made known to each member of them by the Executive. Trusting to the patriotism and ability of the Executive, I fully endorse their action beforehand, and call on every man in our ranks to support and be guided by them in all that concerns our military brotherhood. Dublin, 9 March 1864.

J. STEPHENS

On 15 July 1865 American-made plans for a rising in Ireland were discovered when the emissary lost them at Kingstown railway station. They found their way to Dublin Castle and to Superintendent Daniel Ryan head of G Division. Ryan had an informer within the offices of the Irish People named Pierce Nagle, he supplied Ryan with an "action this year" message on its way to the IRB unit in Tipperary. With this information, Ryan raided the offices of the Irish People on Thursday 15 September, followed by the arrests of Luby, O'Leary and O'Donovan Rossa. Kickham was caught after a month on the run. Stephens would also be caught but with the support of Fenian prison warders, John J. Breslin and Daniel Byrne was less than a fortnight in Richmond Bridewell when he vanished and escaped to France. The last number of the paper is dated 16 September 1865.

== Trial and sentence ==
After his arrest and the suppression of the Irish People he was sentenced to twenty years' penal servitude. In his speech from the dock he said:

From the time I came to what have been called the years of discretion, my entire thought has been devoted to Ireland. I believed the course I pursued was right; others may take a different view. When the proceedings of this trial go forth to the world, the people will say that the cause of Ireland is not to be despaired of, that Ireland is not yet a lost country—that as long as there are men in any country prepared to expose themselves to every difficulty and danger in its service, prepared to brave captivity, even death itself if needs be, that country cannot be lost.

== Release ==
Luby was released in January 1871, but was compelled to remain away from Ireland till the expiration of his sentence.

== America ==
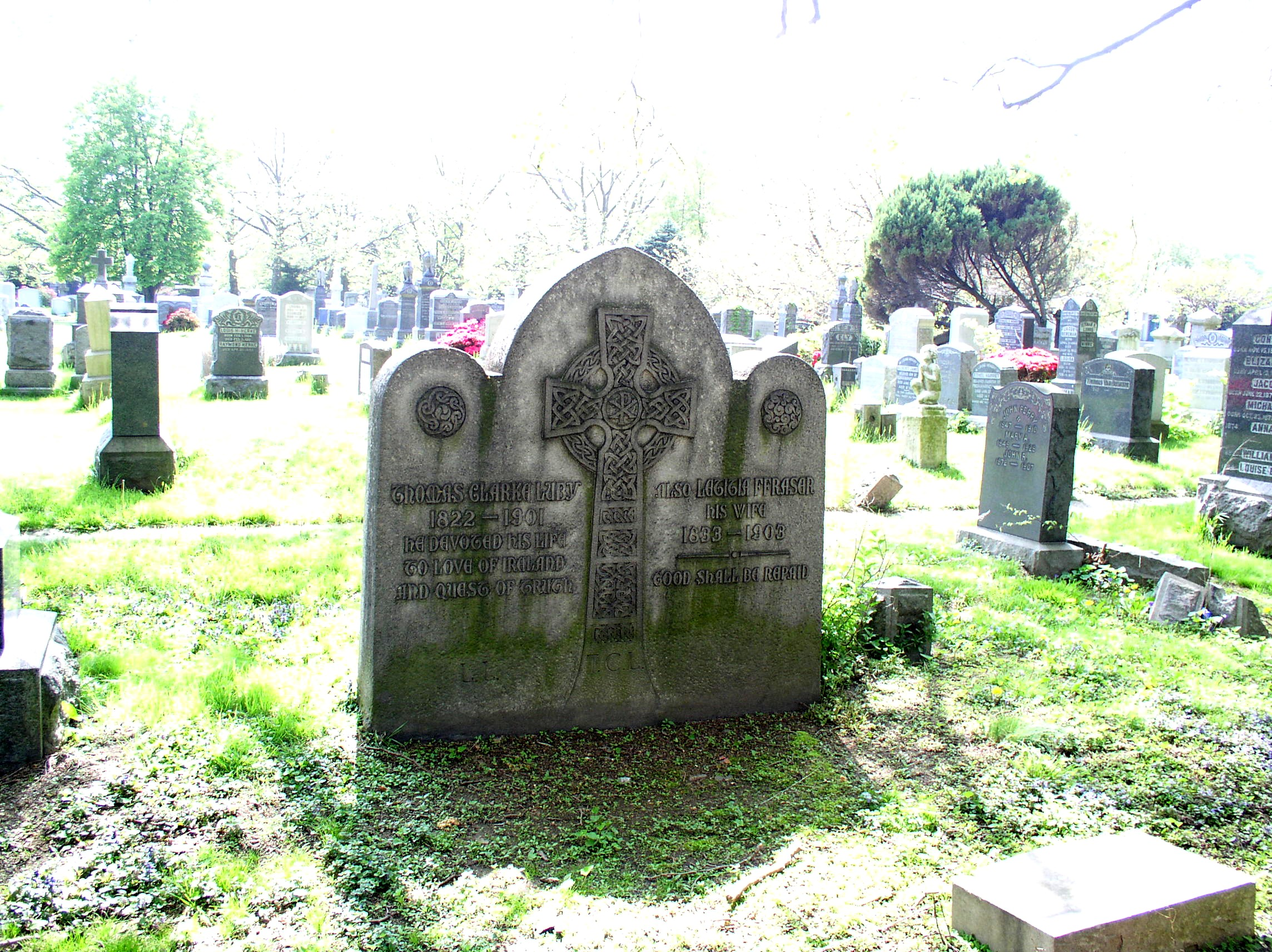
T.C. Luby Grave

On release he went first to the Continent, and later settled in New York, he lectured all over the country for years, and wrote for a number of Irish newspapers on political topics. At the memorial meeting on the death of John Mitchel, he delivered the principal address in Madison Square Gardens.

He died at 109½ Oak Street, Jersey City, of paralysis, on the 29 November 1901 and was buried in Bay View Cemetery in that city, in a grave shared with his wife. His epitaph reads: "Thomas Clarke Luby 1822–1901 He devoted his life to love of Ireland and quest of truth."

== Conclusion ==
Luby was the author of The Lives of Illustrious and Representative Irishmen, and a Life of Daniel O'Connell. In 1926 his daughter, Mrs. Maurice, presented the National Library, Dublin, with his papers, including historical sketches and some unpublished plays in which the characters are drawn from life. His wife was the daughter of John Jean Frazer, who wrote poems for the Nation and the Irish Felon. Mark Ryan a contemporary of Luby's was to write in his Fenian Memories whom he met while on a private visit to America, "I was very much impressed by him, and found him to be all I had heard of him from O'Leary, who had a great admiration for his ability and uncompromising patriotism. He was a quiet, kindly, courteous man, who had risen above his Conservative environment, boldly espoused the cause of his country, and never regretted his action."

== Sources ==
- The Fenian Chief: A Biography of James Stephens, Desmond Ryan, Hely Thom LTD, Dublin, 1967
- Fenian Memories, Dr. Mark F. Ryan, Edited by T.F. O'Sullivan, M. H. Gill & Son, LTD, Dublin, 1945
- Rossa's Recollections, 1838 to 1898, O'Donovan Rossa, Mariner"s Harbor, NY, 1898
- A new Dictionary of Irish History: From 1800, D.J. Hickey & J.E. Doherty, Gill & MacMillan, Dublin/Norway, 2003, ISBN 0-7171-2520-3
