= James Stephens (Fenian) =

Irish rebel (1825–1901)

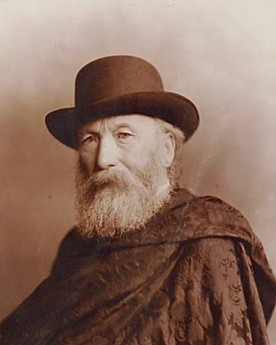

President of the Irish Republican Brotherhood
- In office 17 March 1858 – December 1866
- Succeeded by: Thomas J. Kelly

Personal details
- Born: 26 January 1825 Waterford, Ireland
- Died: 29 March 1901 (aged 76) Blackrock, County Dublin, Ireland
- Resting place: Glasnevin Cemetery
- Occupation: Civil engineer, teacher, translator, newspaper publisher
- Nickname: "Seabhach Siulach" (the Wandering Hawk)

James Stephens (Irish: Séamus Mac Stiofáin; 26 January 1825 – 29 March 1901) was an Irish Republican, and the founding member of an originally unnamed revolutionary organisation in Dublin. This organisation, founded on 17 March 1858, was later to become known as the Irish Republican Brotherhood (I.R.B).

== Early life ==
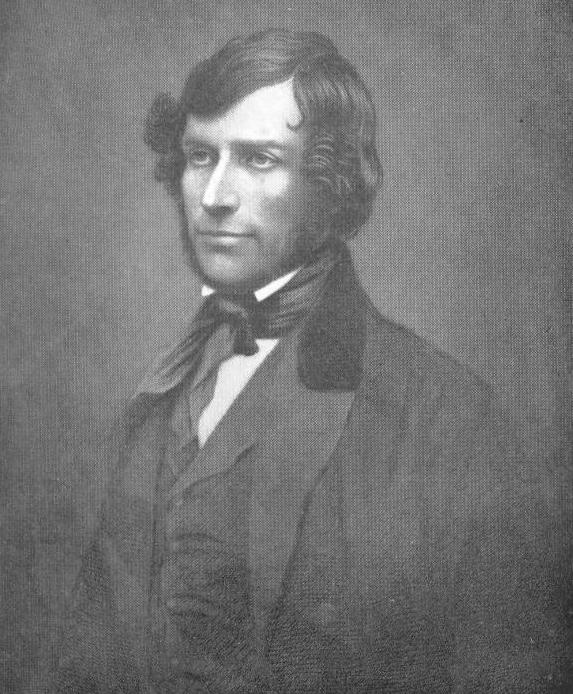
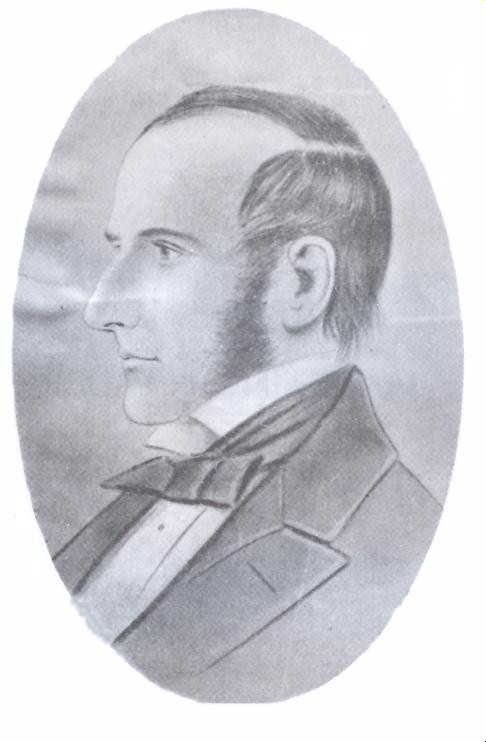
John Mitchel and James Fintan Lalor were influential on Stephens' political views

References to his early life, according to one of his biographers, Desmond Ryan, are obscure and limited to Stephens' own vague autobiographical recollections. James Stephens was born at Lilac Cottage, Blackmill Street, Kilkenny, on 26 January 1825 and spent his childhood there. No birth records have ever been located, but a baptismal record from St. Mary's Parish is dated 29 July 1825. According to Marta Ramón, there is reason to believe that he was born out of wedlock in late July 1825; however, according to Stephens his exact date of birth was 26 January.

The son of John and Anne Stephens (née Casey), he had five brothers and sisters: Walter, John, Francis, who died when James was ten, Harriet, who had died by July 1848, and Anne, who died just after his flight into exile, as did his father. By 1856, Stephens' remaining family had vanished without a trace, according to Ramón.

For many years, his father had been a clerk to auctioneer and bookseller William Jackson Douglas whose offices and warehouses were on High Street, Kilkenny. Ryan has the order of the name as William Douglas Jackson, of Rose Inn Street, in his Stephens' biography Fenian Chief. John Stephens, as well as his earnings as a clerk, also had some small property in Kilkenny; records show him as occupier of 13 Evan's Lane, St. Mary's Parish and 22 Chapel Lane, St. Canice's Parish, his residence at the time of the rising.

Little is known of Stephens's mother and according to Ryan, it is possible he had no memory of her. Only briefly does Stephens mention her in his writings, although her name appears on Stephens' marriage certificate in 1863. His mother's people, the Caseys, were shopkeepers; one account says they ran a small hardware business. In April 1846 James and his sister, Anne, became sponsors to their cousin, Joseph Casey, at his baptism in St. Mary's Cathedral, Kilkenny. Joseph Casey would later be acquitted of charges of suspected Fenian activities in England in 1867. During Stephens' second exile in Paris, he would spend much time with the Caseys, who emigrated to France after the trial of Joseph. Stephens would be expelled from France on 12 March 1885 because of a series of press interviews given by Patrick Casey advocating the "dynamite war," which Stephens had repudiated consistently.

Because his father was intent on giving his son the best education his means would allow, Stephens was registered as a day pupil at St. Kieran's college for at least one quarter in 1838. Prior to this, he had attended St. Kieran's school beside his home, before the school moved to College Road.

An omnivorous reader, Stephens, according to Ryan, was a silent and aloof student with a thirst for knowledge, a characteristic throughout his life. Aged 20, Stephens was apprenticed to a civil engineer and obtained a post in a Kilkenny office for work then in progress on the Limerick and Waterford Railway in 1844.

Stephens was in a romantic relationship with a young lady, Miss Hilton, at this time, although she did not share his nationalist sentiments. This relationship ended shortly after the rising.

According to Ryan, for an unexplained reason, Stephens had already become a "revolutionary in spirit" by his mid twenties. The one influence he mentions in this period was that of Dr. Robert Cane a former Mayor of Kilkenny, a cultural propagandist, and a moderate Young Irelander.

As a young man, Stephens had declined to affiliate with any political organisation. He distrusted the conciliatory Repealers of the O'Connell school, describing the Repeal agitator as "a wind-bag"; the Young Ireland Confederation, however, was of "sterner stuff", and he was better inclined towards them. His father also was a strong sympathiser and was moderately active in local politics. The Kilkenny Irish Confederation club would later lend some economic assistance to Stephens during his Paris exile.

Ireland in the 1840s was devastated by the Great Famine; the Repeal movement was in decline, and the country moved towards insurrection, aided by the incitements of John Mitchel and James Fintan Lalor. Stephens sympathies lay more with the Mitchel and Lalor brand of republicanism, than with Charles Gavan Duffy's and William Smith O'Brien's mild constitutionalism. This would come to a head with the revolutions sweeping Europe from the Paris barricades of February 1848. According to Ryan, Stephens was caught up in these impulses and added secret drilling to his work of railway construction.

== Young Ireland and 1848 ==
The only written accounts of Stephens political opinions prior to 1848 are the letters he wrote just after the insurrection and his recollections published in the Irishman newspaper beginning on 4 February 1882, and his "Notes on a 3,000 miles walk through Ireland" published in the Weekly Freeman from 6 October 1883.

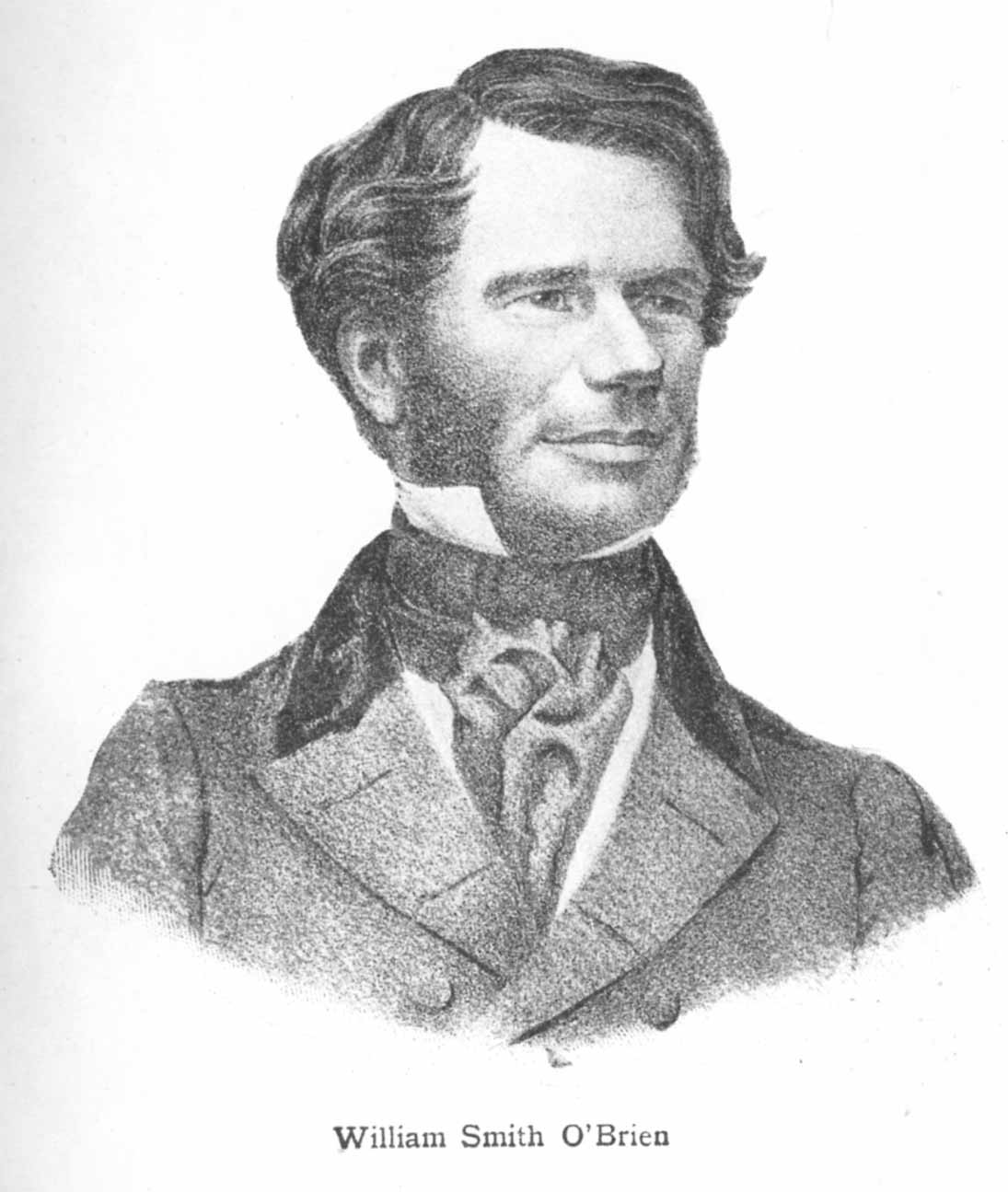
William Smith O'Brien

With John Mitchel transported to Van Diemen's Land (modern-day Tasmania, Australia) by a packed jury under the purposely enacted Treason Felony Act, leadership of the Confederation fell to William Smith O'Brien. O'Brien arrived in Kilkenny on 24 July 1848 to call on the people to confront "the perils and the honours of a righteous war." The next day, at a meeting of the Confederate clubs, Stephens was called upon to appear on the platform by his friends where he then delivered his maiden speech;

Friends, you are called upon by a proclamation of the British Executive to surrender such arms as you may have in your possession, and you are threatened with all the pains and penalties of the law from retaining them after tomorrow's sunset. Now, my deliberate advice to you is this. Treasure your arms as you would the apples of your eyes, and bury them safely with the hope of a happy resurrection.

Later Stephens and his father went to a private meeting in the Victoria Hotel, when a Mr. John Grace rushed in to say there was someone with a warrant for the arrest of O'Brien at the Rose Inn. A Mr. Kavanagh who was present at the meeting asked who would come with him to take the detective prisoner, which Stephens agreed to do. This would be the last time Stephens would ever see his father again. Having gone to get some arms, the two men went to the Inn and detained the individual. It later turned out to be Patrick O'Donoghue a member of the Confederate council with a message for O'Brien. Until his identity could be established, it was decided he would be brought to O'Brien with the clear warning that if he was who he said he was he would forgive their zeal, if however he tried to escape he would be shot.

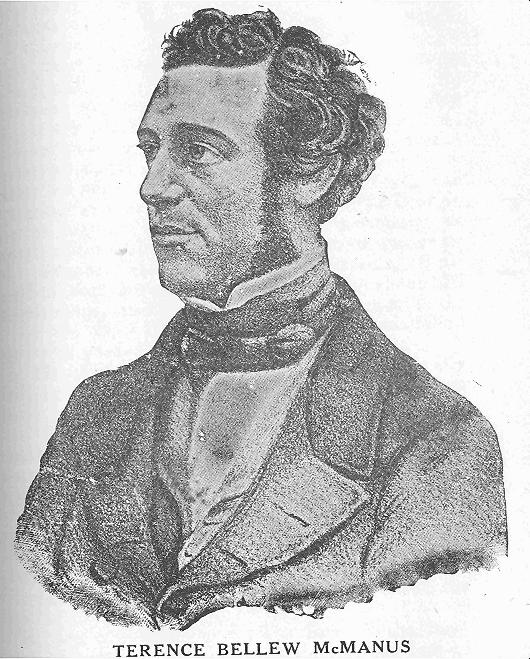
Terence Bellew MacManus

While going to Thurles to meet up with O'Brien they came across P.J. Smith a leading member of the Young Irelanders who vouched for O'Donoghue. Smith, who would later successfully plan the escape of Mitchel from Van Diemen's Land, was on his way to Dublin to arrange plans to tear up the railway line in Thurles and the Dublin suburbs and for the Meath clubs to create a diversion. Stephens and O'Donoghue agreed to take charge of the Thurles line, later passing the order on to the local Confederates, who destroyed parts of the Great Southern and Western Railway line near the town.

Stephens, O'Donoghue and Kavanagh headed to Cashel and arrived there between ten and eleven o'clock on 26 July and proceeded to the home of Michael Doheny. There they found with some difficulty, O'Brien, John Blake Dillon and James Cantwell. It was here that Kavanagh decided that insurrection was hopeless and left, and according to Ramón, Stephens "took the most fateful decision of his life and resolved to stay." Stephens and O'Donoghue said they would follow O'Brien to the end according to Ryan. Stephens was appointed aide de camp to William Smith O'Brien on the spot, later Doheny would write, "when they expected that every man would make a fortress in his heart, they were almost abandoned, but their resolution remained unchanged."

From Cashel they then headed towards Killenaule before making for Mullinahone where for the first time Stephens would meet Charles J. Kickham who would become a future leader of the Irish Republican Brotherhood. It was in Mullinahone that they had their first confrontation with the authorities, a somewhat "tragicomic" affair displaying both "moral integrity and revolutionary naivety." On Thursday 27 July they moved towards Ballingarry where they were joined by Terence Bellew MacManus who had come from Liverpool.

On Friday 28 July, while in Killenaule, news reached them that a party of dragoons were on their way to arrest O'Brien, which resulted in two barricades being erected in the main street which Stephens armed with a rifle manned along with thirty men mostly armed with pikes, pitch-forks and a couple of muskets. As the dragoons approached the barricade Stephens levelled his rifle at their commander a Captain Longmore, as Dillon mounted the barricade and asked if they were there to arrest O'Brien. When Captain Longmore answered that they had no warrant for O'Brien, they were led thorough the barricade and allowed to go through the town.

Leaving Killenaule, they carried on towards Ballingarry, conducting drilling exercises at the collieries before moving on to Boulagh Commons two miles outside town. During the night they were joined by a number of the Young Ireland leaders who had been trying to co-ordinate their efforts unsuccessfully. They held a council of war at the local inn, with fourteen members present, including Stephens and joined by both John O'Mahony and Thomas Francis Meagher. Discussing the situation, the majority of leaders favoured going into hiding until the harvests were in, and making an attempt under more favourable circumstances, however O'Brien refused adamantly. It was decided then that Dillon, Doheny, Meagher and O'Mahony would try to rally the various districts while O'Brien would hold on where he was. While present at the council, Stephens did not offer his opinions, due to his "youthful modesty", according to Ramón, citing Stephens' personal recollections.

On the morning of Saturday 29 July in Callan Sub-Inspector Thomas Trant received an order from Purefoy Poe, J.P. to proceed to the Commons. As Trant's force of 46 men passed through Nine-Mile House they were observed by John Kavanagh president of one of the Dublin clubs. Borrowing a horse he rode off to warn O'Brien of their approach. The leaders at this time had just agreed to move on Urlingford when Kavanagh arrived. It was decided after a short discussion that they would stay and confront the police. A barricade was quickly thrown up, and Stephens was placed in a house with a number of armed men overlooking this barricade.

On coming closer to the town, Trant observed the barricades and a party of rebels prepared to meet them, with a multitude approaching them from all sides. Moving forward Trant then turned his men right and spotting an isolated house on the top of a hill rushed to the building and took refuge inside. The house belonged to a widow, Margaret McCormack; while out of the house at the time, she had left her five children there. Taking the children hostage, the police quickly began to barricade the windows and doors.

Following this event, Stephens, along with the others involved, was a wanted man. Reports of his death were published in the Kilkenny Moderator on 19 August with the intention of throwing the authorities off his trail. He fled Ireland and escaped to France where he remained for the next seven years.

== Paris exile ==
After the collapse of the 48 rebellion James Stephens and John O'Mahony went to the Continent to avoid arrest. In Paris they supported themselves through teaching and translation work and planned the next stage of "the fight to overthrow British rule in Ireland." Stephens in Paris, set himself three tasks, during his seven years of exile. They were, to keep alive, pursue knowledge, and master the technique of conspiracy. At this time Paris particularly, was interwoven with a network of secret political societies. They became members of one of the most powerful of these societies and acquired the secrets of some of the ablest and "most profound masters of revolutionary science" which the nineteenth century had produced, as to the means of inviting and combining people for the purposes of successful revolution.

In 1853 O'Mahony went to America and founded the Emmet Monument Association

== 3,000-mile walk ==
Stephens in early 1856 began making his way back to Ireland, stopping first in London. On arriving in Dublin, Stephens began what he described as his three thousand mile walk through Ireland, meeting some of those who had taken part in the 1848 /49 revolutionary movements, including Philip Gray, Thomas Clarke Luby and Peter Langan.

== Founding of the IRB ==
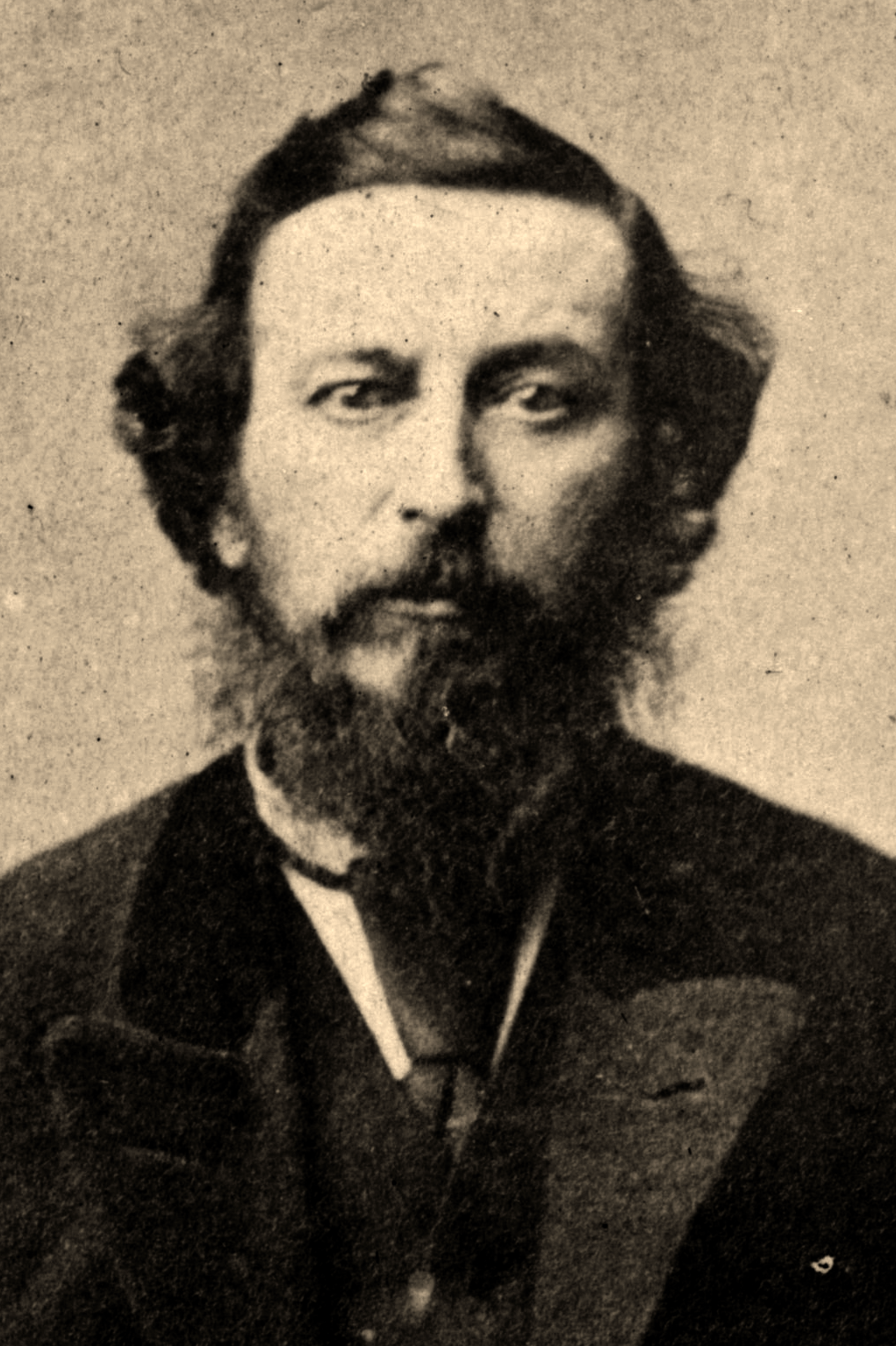
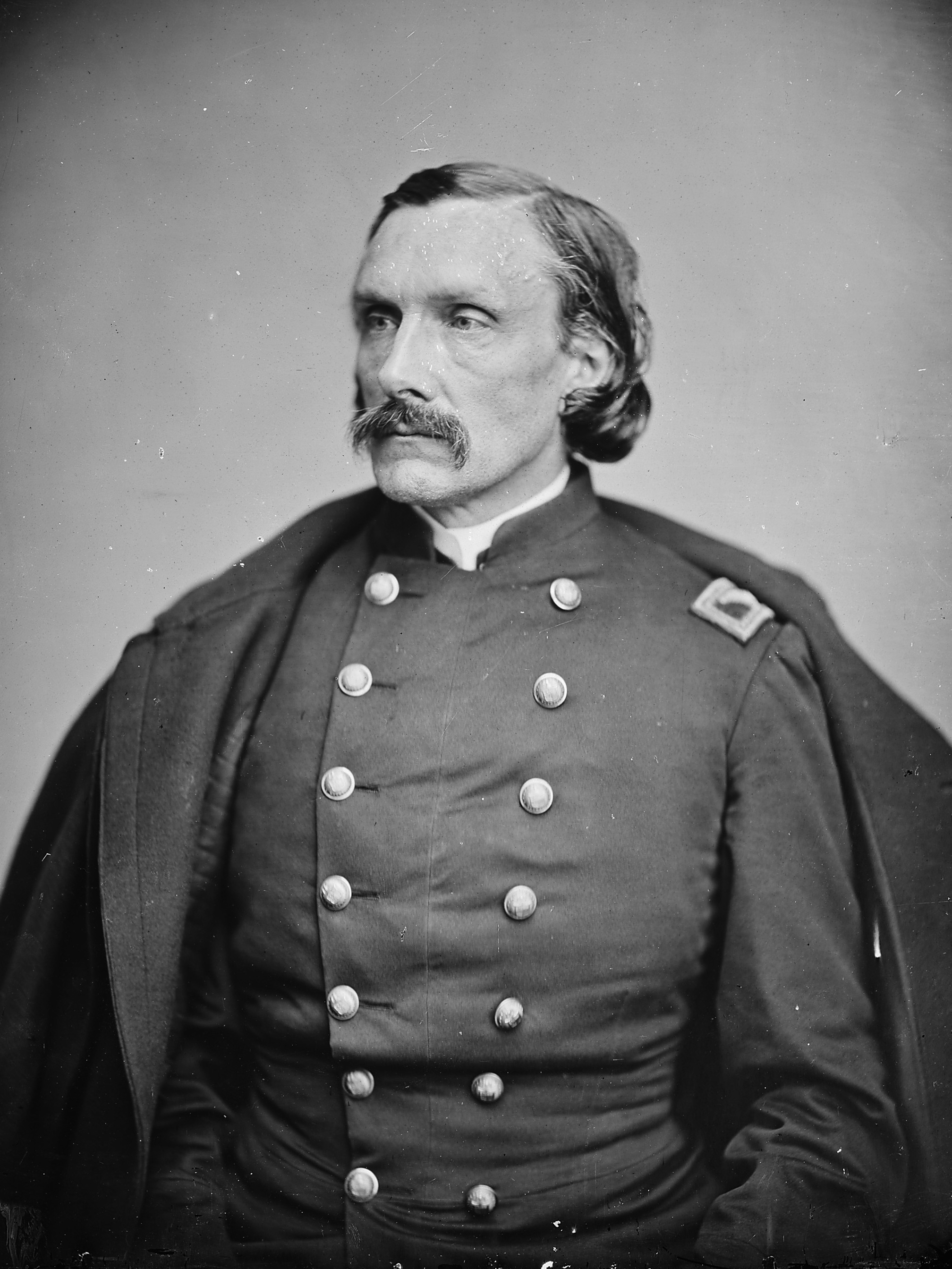
Thomas Clarke Luby and John O'Mahony were amongst those who founded the Irish Republican Brotherhood alongside Stephens

In the autumn of 1857, a messenger, Owen Considine arrived from New York with a message for Stephens from members of the Emmet Monument Association, calling on him to get up an organisation in Ireland. Considine also carried a private letter from O'Mahony to Stephens which was a warning as to the condition of the organisation in New York, which was overseen by Luby and Stephens at the time. Both had believed that there was a strong organisation behind the letter, only later to find it was a number of loosely linked groups.

On 23 December, Stephens dispatched Joseph Denieffe to America with his reply which was disguised as a business letter, and dated and addressed from Paris. In his reply Stephens outlined his conditions and his requirements from the organisation in America. Stephens demanded uncontrolled power and £100 a month for the first three months. Denieffe returned on 17 March 1858 with the acceptance of Stephens' terms and £80. Denieffe also reported that there was no actual organised body of sympathizers in New York but merely a loose knot of associates. This disturbed Stephens but he went ahead regardless and that evening, Saint Patrick's Day, the Irish Republican Brotherhood commenced.

The original oath, with its clauses of secrecy was drawn up by Luby under Stephens' direction in Stephens' room in Donnelly's which was situated behind Lombard Street. Luby then swore Stephens in and he did likewise. The oath read:

I, AB., do solemnly swear, in the presence of Almighty God, that I will do my utmost, at every risk, while life lasts, to make Ireland an independent Democratic Republic; that I will yield implicit obedience, in all things not contrary to the law of God to the commands of my superior officers; and that I shall preserve inviolable secrecy regarding all the transactions of this secret society that may be confided in me. So help me God! Amen.

Those present in Langan's, lathe-maker and timber merchant, 16 Lombard Street for that first meeting apart from Stephens and Luby were Peter Langan, Charles Kickham, Joseph Denieffe and Garrett O'Shaughnessy. Later it would include members of the Phoenix National and Literary Society, which was formed in 1856 by Jeremiah O'Donovan Rossa in Skibbereen.

== America ==
Stephens arrived in New York on Wednesday 13 October 1858. After a trying voyage, he went first to the Metropolitan Hotel to recuperate before going to meet Doheny and O'Mahony.

Stephens succeeded in his mission to America, though, according to Ryan, Stephens omits this fact from his diary. It is, he says, only by the definite assertions of John O'Leary that we know of this success, overcoming the many obstacles placed in his way including the Directory and the '48 leaders. According to Ryan, Stephens would bind in Ireland and America for nearly a decade, warring and ineffective elements, into a formidable political and revolutionary force.

== America diary ==
While in America, Stephens kept a diary, which opens with the date 7 January 1859, three months after his arrival and, with the last entry on 25 March 1860. The original copy of the diary is now kept in the Public Records Office in Northern Ireland.

=== The Irish People ===
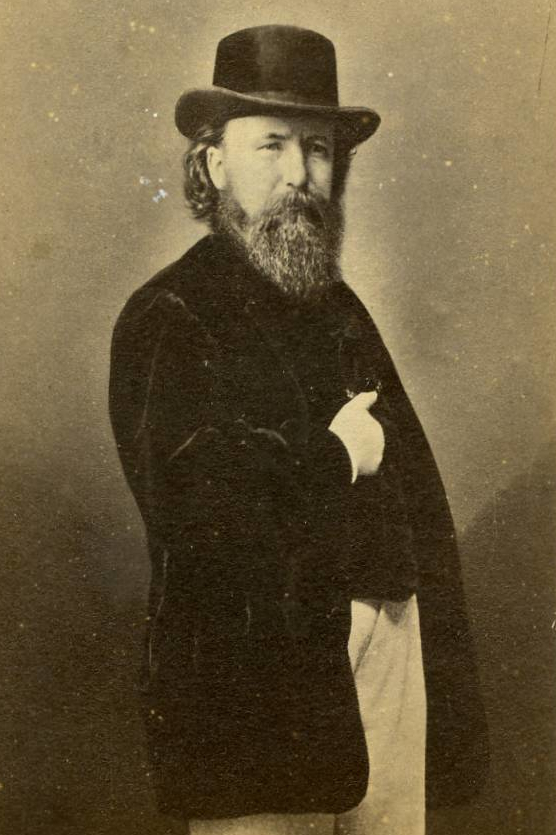
A portrait of a middle-aged Stephens

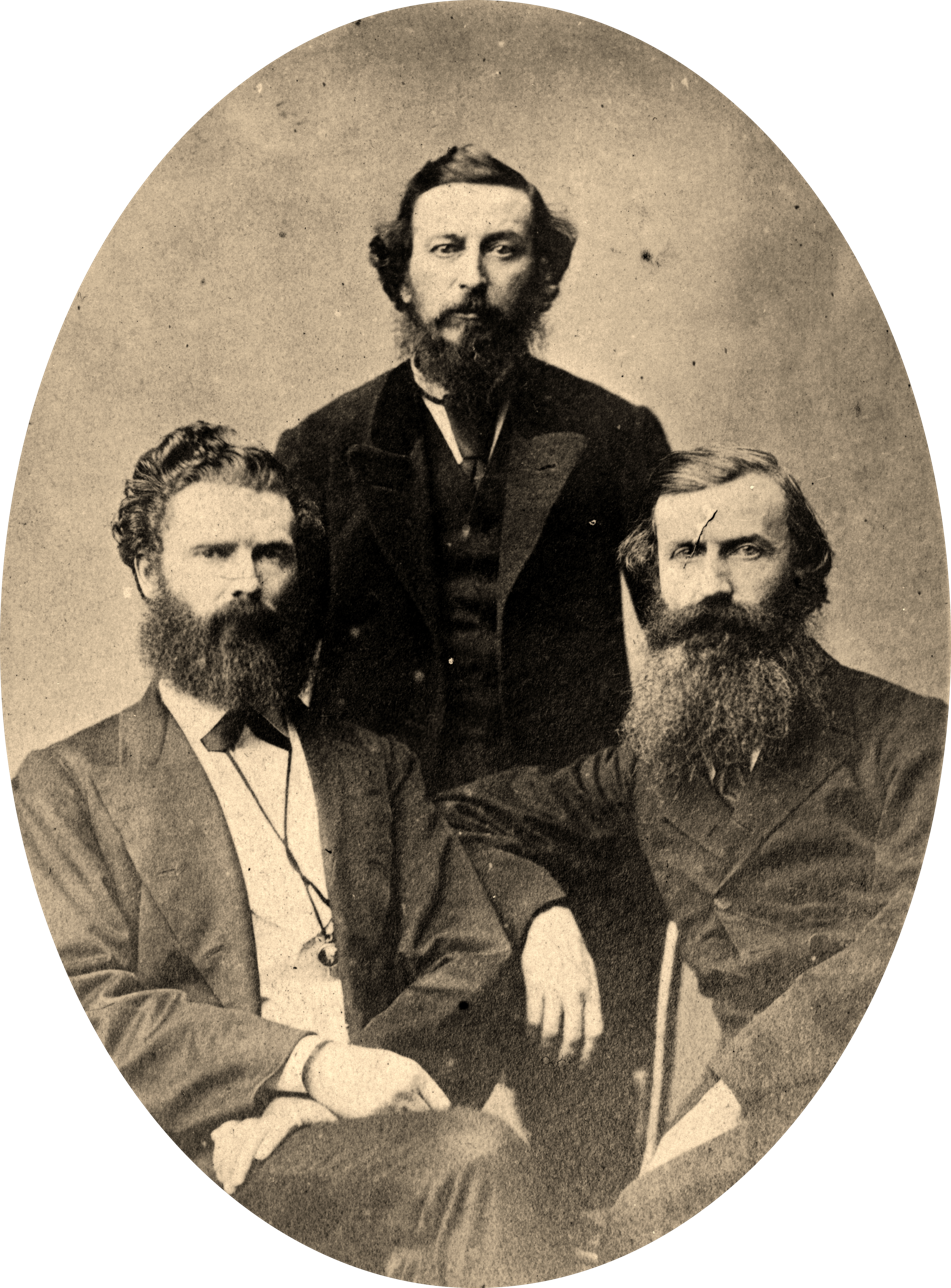
Denis Dowling Mulcahy, Thomas Clarke Luby and John O'Leary, staff at the Irish people newspaper

In mid-1863, Stephens informed his colleagues he wished to start a newspaper, with financial aid from O'Mahony and the Fenian Brotherhood in America. The offices were established at 12 Parliament Street, almost at the gates of Dublin Castle. The first number of The Irish People appeared on 28 November 1863. The staff of the paper along with Kickham were Luby and Denis Dowling Mulcahy as the editorial staff. O'Donovan Rossa and James O'Connor had charge of the business office, with John Haltigan being the printer. John O'Leary was brought from London to take charge in the role of Editor. Shortly after the establishment of the paper, Stephens departed on an America tour and to attend to organizational matters. Before leaving, he entrusted to Luby a document containing secret resolutions on the Committee of Organization or Executive of the IRB. Though Luby intimated its existence to O'Leary, he did not inform Kickham as there seemed no necessity. This document would later form the basis of the prosecution against the staff of the Irish People. The document read:

EXECUTIVE

I hereby appoint Thomas Clarke Luby, John O'Leary and Charles J. Kickham, a Committee of Organization or Executive, with the same supreme control over the Home Organization (Ireland, England, Scotland, etc.) I have exercised myself. I further empower them to appoint a Committee of Military Inspection, and a Committee of Appeal and Judgment, the functions of which Committee will be made known to each member of them by the Executive. Trusting to the patriotism and ability of the Executive, I fully endorse their action beforehand, and call on every man in our ranks to support and be guided by them in all that concerns our military brotherhood.
9 March 1864, Dublin

J. STEPHENS

=== Arrest and suppression ===
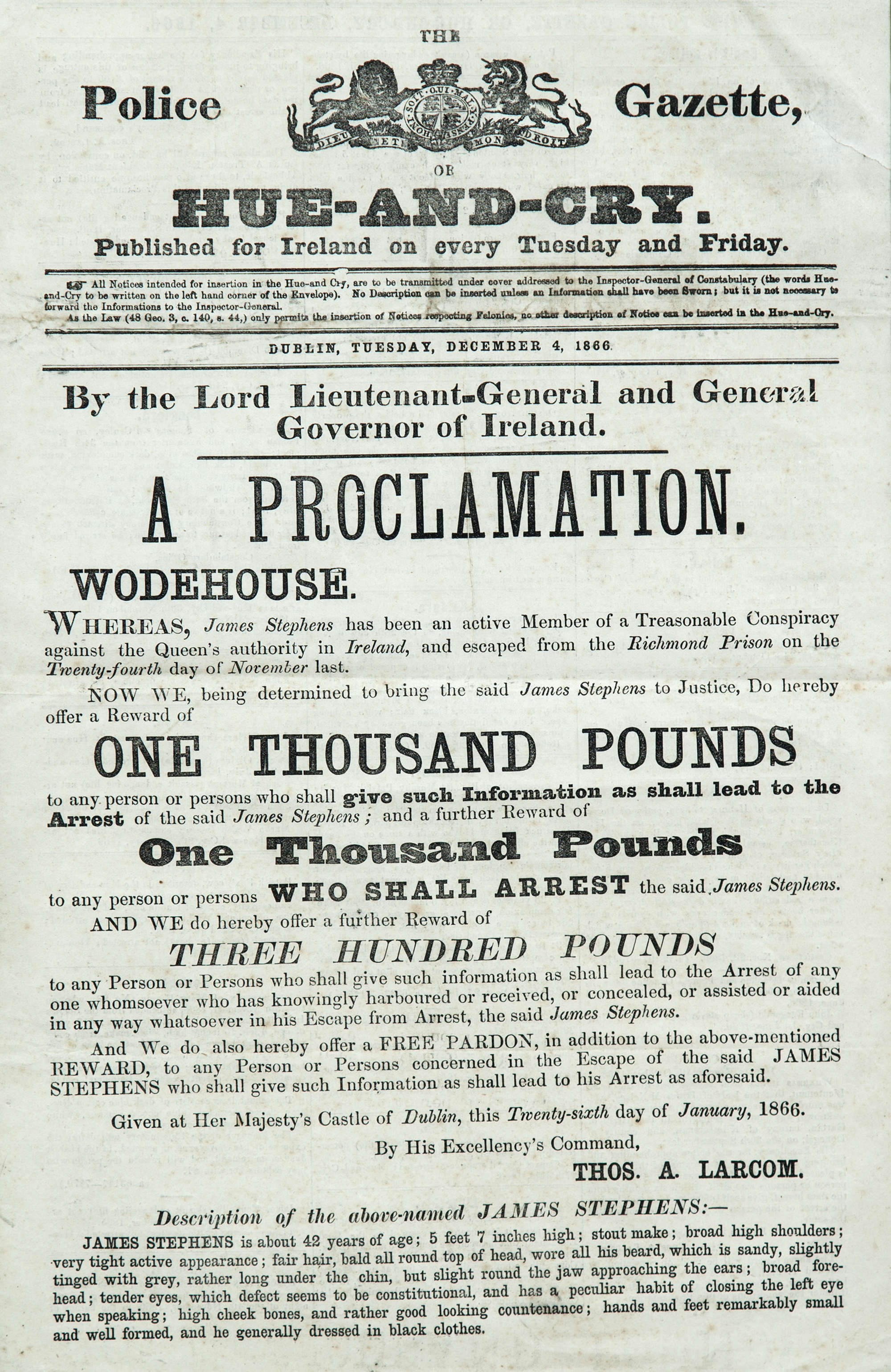
Wanted poster from January 1866 offering £1,000 for information leading to the capture of Stephens

On 15 July 1865, American-made plans for a rising in Ireland were discovered when the emissary lost them at Kingstown railway station. They found their way to Dublin Castle and to Superintendent Daniel Ryan head of G Division. Ryan had an informer within the offices of the Irish People named Pierce Nagle, he supplied Ryan with an "action this year" message on its way to the IRB unit in Tipperary. With this information, Ryan raided the offices of the Irish People on Thursday 15 September, followed by the arrests of O'Leary, Luby and O'Donovan Rossa. Kickham was caught after a month on the run. Stephens was arrested on 11 November 1865 but was in Richmond Bridewell prison less than two weeks before his escape.

=== Escape ===
Stephens made his escape with the support of Fenian prison warders John J. Breslin and Daniel Byrne inside and John Devoy and others outside. Breslin would go on to play a leading part in the Catalpa rescue of Fenian prisoners in the British penal colony of Western Australia. Daniel Byrne escaped to France.

== Death ==
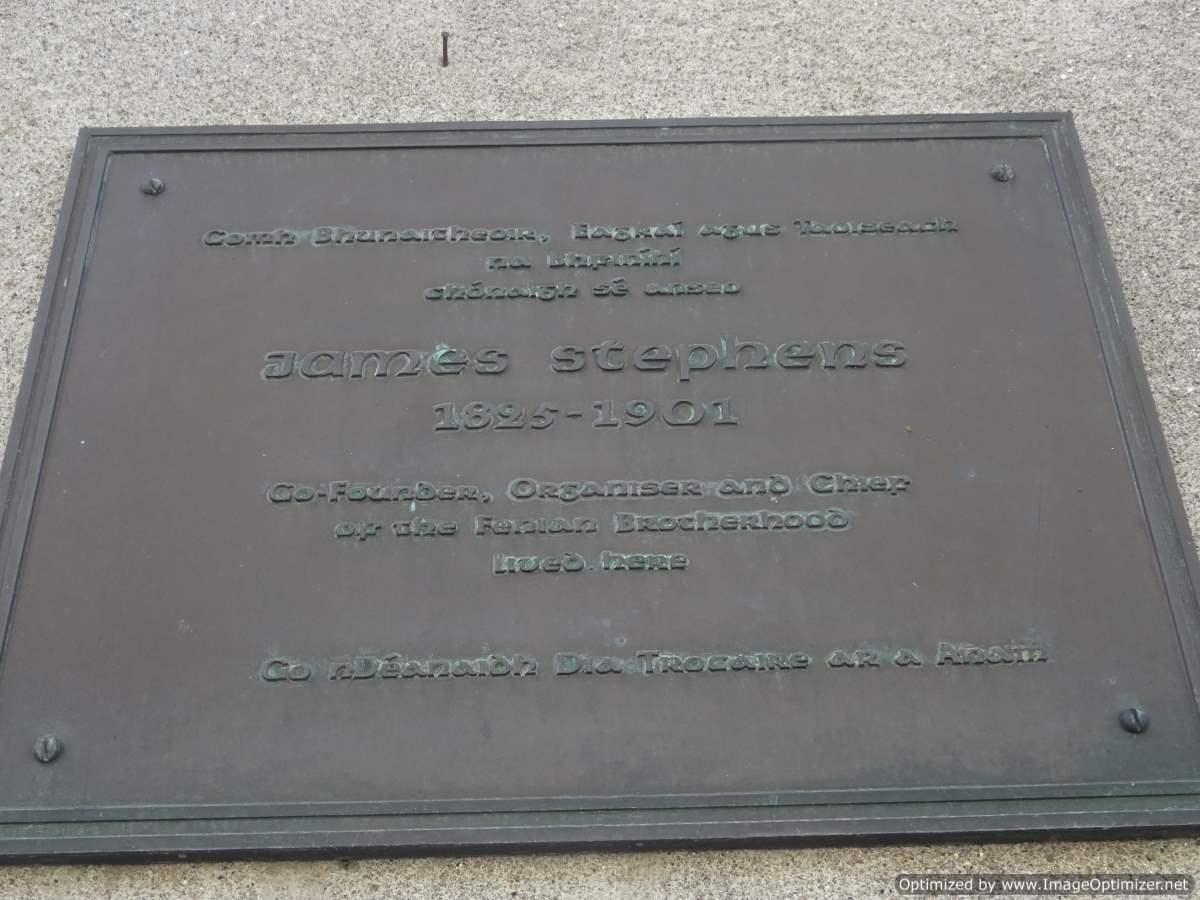
Plaque on Stephens' childhood home, Kilkenny

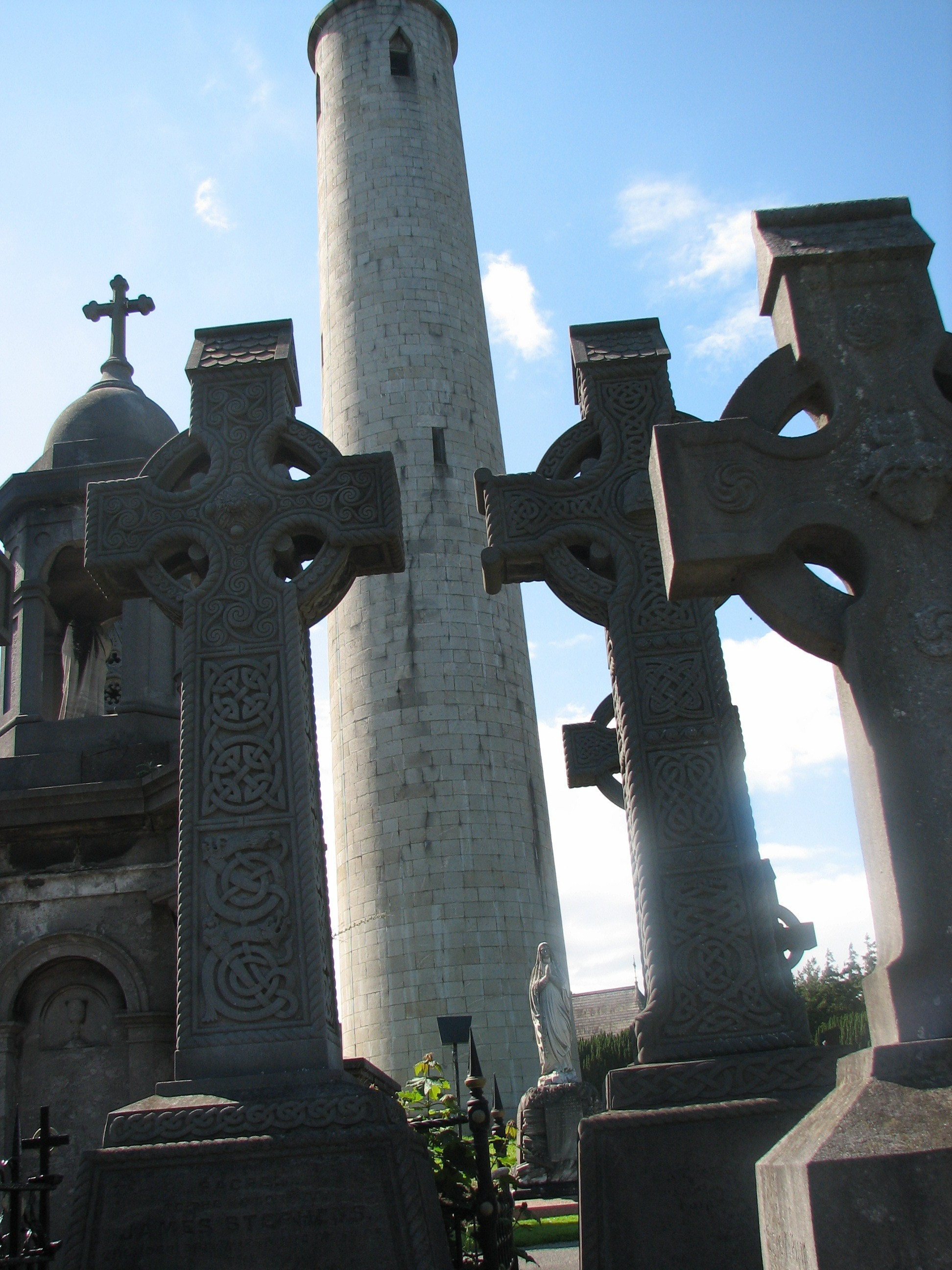
Stephens and O'Leary buried side by side. A Panel on the Celtic cross reads: "A day, an hour of virtuous liberty is worth a whole eternity in bondage."

Stephens died on 29 March 1901 in Blackrock, Dublin and after his funeral on 31 March he was brought to Glasnevin cemetery. His pall bearers were James Bermingham, Michael Davitt, C. G. Doran, Michael Lambert, William Brophy and William Hickey – all '67 veterans.

=== Honours and memorials ===
His house in Kilkenny was on Blackmill St. near St. Mary's Cathedral. The house still stands today and a plaque displayed on it marks the house as his birthplace.

Stephens Barracks in Kilkenny is named in honour of Stephens and is the headquarters of the Stephens 3 Infantry Battalion.

Ballina Stephenites GAA are named after Stephens, and their grounds are named James Stephens Park.

James Stephens GAA Club founded 1887 in Kilkenny city (commonly referred to as "The Village") are named in his honour

== Bibliography ==
- Ryan, Desmond (1967). The Fenian Chief: A biography of James Stephens. Gill and Son.
- Ramón, Marta (2007). A Provisional Dictator: James Stephens and the Fenian Movement. UCD Press.
