= Philip Gray =

Philip Gray (1821 – 28 February 1857) was an Irish republican, revolutionary and a member of the Irish Confederation. He took part in the Risings of 1848 and 1849 along with James Fintan Lalor and both James Stephens and John O'Mahony, who would go on to establish the Irish Republican Brotherhood in Ireland and the Fenian Brotherhood in the United States.

== Early life ==
Philip Gray was born in Dublin, Ireland; a former mechanic, clerk and part-time medical student, he along with Thomas Clarke Luby, according to Owen McGee, constituted the remnants of the Irish revolutionary conspiracy started in 1849.

== Young Irelanders ==
He joined the Swift Confederate Club in 1847, and became its secretary and leading inspiration. Under his influence the Club became one of the most militant and active of the Dublin clubs.

Gray studied military texts every evening in the Club premises in Queen's Street. The members of the Club also tried recruiting from English regiments, stationed in Ireland. The Swift Confederate Club was very frustrated when the Confederate leaders came to the decision not to attempt the rescue of John Mitchel before his transportation.

== 1848 Rebellion ==
While William Smith O'Brien attempted to arouse a Rebellion in the South of Ireland, Gray tried to instigate an insurrection in County Meath, and failing, left his position in the Railway office in Drogheda and made his way to County Tipperary. After the failure at Ballingarry on 29 July 1848, he joined up with John O'Mahony, who entrusted the command of the County Waterford insurgents to John Savage and Gray. He was involved in an attack on the Portlaw police barracks. O'Mahony described Gray years later as the most indomitable man he met in 1848.

Gray underwent many hardships while eluding capture by both the police and military in County Waterford for four months in the autumn and early winter of 1848. Hiding out in the Knockmealdown and Comeragh Mountains. He worked to form a secret society pledged to Irish independence in the valley of the Suir. He then returned to Dublin, where he put a lot of his old friends from the Swift Confederate Club under oath, and was reputed to have had a thousand members in Dublin alone after which he escaped to France. While in France he met up again with O'Mahony and Stephens.

== Returns to Ireland ==
He returned in 1849 and was again an active agent in organising another out-break in the autumn of that year in the company of James Fintan Lalor, having established a secret military society. They were then joined by Luby, Joseph Brennan and a dozen other members who had been active in the Swift Confederate Club, who met with Gray near Rathmines' church, Dublin, and joined the Society. Lalor had attempted in a letter to persuade Charles Gavan Duffy to join with them, but Gavan Duffy informed him that he would have no hand, act or part in any secret society, and attempted to dissuade Lalor from participation in such societies.

== 1849 Rising ==
The attack on the police barracks at Cappoquin took place that September, and was to signal the end of that Insurrectionary movement.

== The Tribune ==
Gray returned to Dublin, and secured a clerkship at an office in Smithfield, and afterwards held a position in the office of The Tribune, which was established by John Edward Pigot, the son of David Richard Pigot, the Roman Catholic Lord Chief Baron of the Exchequer Rev. John Kenyon, Prof. Sullivan, Thomas Mason Jones, Denny Lane, John O'Donnell, Ryan of Bruree, and others, with Thomas Wallis and John Fisher Murray as contributors, with Thomas Clarke Luby as sub-editor. This account is somewhat contradicted by Robert Kee, who suggests that the paper belonged to Philip Gray.

James Stephens returned to Ireland in 1856, an Ireland in which, suggests Robert Kee, virtually the only nationalist thinking was in the new newspaper, The Tribune. The paper was the only one which was analysing the demand for Tenant Rights, and maintained that the real demand was for something much more fundamental than that. The paper, Kee writes, "that a landlord had a right to do what he would with his own but asked whether the land really was the landlord's own." Quoting from the paper he continues "The truth is" (it declared in italics), "that all the land of Ireland belongs to the people of Ireland, in the aggregate, to be distributed and made use of just so as best may serve the happiness, prosperity, peace and security of the People of Ireland."

It published another leader headed "No True Idea of Nationality in Ireland". In this it deplored "Irishmen’s existing incapability of comprehending the large idea of an Irish Nation. It is true they talk of their country very plausibly, and in the most high flown terms; but behind all this there is no clear and comprehensive idea of the universal Irish nation, taking in the entire population. All notions of country in the popular mind are vague and confused . . ." The paper ceased publication in 1856.

== Death ==
Philip Gray died in Dublin on 28 February 1857, in his 36th year, and was laid to rest in the family burial ground at Kilglass, County Meath. James Stephens and Thomas Clarke Luby attended the service, at which Stephens spoke.

== Sources ==
- The IRB: The Irish Republican Brotherhood from The Land League to Sinn Féin, Owen McGee, Four Courts Press, 2005, ISBN 1-85182-972-5
- Young Ireland, T. F. O'Sullivan, The Kerryman Ltd. 1945.
- James Fintan Lalor, Thomas, P. O'Neill, Golden Publications 2003.
- Irish Political Prisoners, 1848–1922: Theatres of War, Seán McConville, Routledge, 2003, ISBN 0-415-21991-4
- Vol two of The Green Flag: The Bold Fenian Men, Robert Kee, Quartet Books, 1972, ISBN 0-7043-3096-2
