= Ellen O'Leary =

Irish poet

- Born: 1831; Tipperary, County Tipperary
- Died: 1889 (aged 57–58)
- Writing career
- Genre: Poetry

Ellen O'Leary (1831–1889) was an Irish poet who sympathised with the Fenian movement. She was the sister of Irish nationalist and leading Fenian John O'Leary.

== Life ==
Ellen O'Leary was born in 1831 in the town of Tipperary, County Tipperary. Her father was a shopkeeper.

Under the pseudonyms of 'Eily' and 'Lenel', O'Leary contributed poetry to The Irish People, an Irish Republican Brotherhood (IRB) newspaper that was published from November 1863. On 15 September 1865, the newspaper was seized by the government. Her brother, along with other editors and contributors, was arrested and sentenced to twenty years' penal servitude, of which five years were spent in English prisons.

Following the suppression of the newspaper, O'Leary joined the IRB's Ladies' Committee, in order to help in the preparations for the 1867 Fenian Rising. However, the rising failed. She decided to return to her home in Tipperary, where she would live until her brother's return in 1885. There, she kept herself busy by writing poetry and volunteering for Catholic charities.

Once her brother John was freed, they moved to Dublin, where they contributed to the Irish Literary Revival by holding weekly salons featuring a host of prominent literary figures such as William Butler Yeats, Katharine Tynan, George Russell, and Rosa Mulholland. Incidentally, it was through one of these salons that she had a role in introducing Maud Gonne to W.B. Yeats.

She lived in Dublin until her death in 1889.

In 1890, just after her death, a collection of her poetry was published, entitled Lays of Country, Home and Friends. However, this volume was heavily edited. It is unknown whether she took part in the selection process for the volume in the final months of her life. Nevertheless, there is evidence that both her brother John O'Leary and her friend W.B. Yeats helped her in correcting and editing the poems she had written twenty years previously.
