= Glen of Aherlow (song) =

Traditional Irish song

The Glen of Aherlow (also known as Patrick Sheehan) is a traditional Irish song which originated as a ballad written by Irish republican Charles Joseph Kickham (1828–1882). It was first printed in The Kilkenny Journal, Kilkenny, on 7 October 1857, the writer using the pseudonym “Darby Ryan, Junior.”

== The song ==
After its publication the song was printed on broadsides, and quickly became popular throughout Ireland. The song has some minor variants on spelling of names and places, depending on where it was sung or collected. It is number J11 in Laws’ collection and #983 in the Roud Folk Song Index.

== Historical background ==
The song is based on the true story of a young ex-soldier from the Glen of Aherlow named Patrick Sheehan who was blinded at the Siege of Sevastopol. Sheehan was later jailed in 1857 for begging in Grafton Street, Dublin, his British army pension having expired after six months.

Due to the publicity arising from this case, the British government was shamed into inquiring about Sheehan, to whom a life pension of a shilling a day was granted.

== Recordings ==
A partial discography:

- Joe Heaney 1964, re-issued on The Road from Connemara, Topic TSCD518D/Cló Iar-Chonnachta CICD 143 (October 2000)
- Vincie Boyle on Around the Hills of Clare Musical Traditions MTCD331-2/Góilín 005-6
- Andy M. Stewart
