= Thomas Luby =

Irish mathematician (1800–1870)

Thomas Luby (1800 – 12 June 1870) was an Irish mathematician.

== Early life and education ==
Thomas Luby was born at Clonmel, County Tipperary, in 1800. He was descended from a Huguenot family which fled from France in 1685 and settled in Canterbury. His father, John Luby, married Eleanor Fogarty, of the old Irish family of Castle Fogarty. He entered Trinity College Dublin as a sizar in 1817, obtaining a scholarship in 1819. He graduated B.A. in 1821, and was awarded the degrees of M.A. in 1825 and D.D. in 1840.

== Academic career ==
Elected to a junior fellowship in 1831, he was co-opted senior fellow in 1847. Among the various college offices filled by him were those of university preacher, censor, junior dean, bursar, senior dean, and senior lecturer, and mathematical examiner in the school of civil engineering. He served as Donegall Lecturer in Mathematics between 1832 and 1847, and as Regius Professor of Greek between 1852 and 1855.

His popularity as a college tutor was unexampled. He was a member of the Royal Irish Academy, to which he presented the autograph of Charles Wolfe's "Burial of Sir John Moore after Corunna", and he wrote for college use An Introductory Treatise on Physical Astronomy (London, 1828), and The Elements of Plane Trigonometry (1825; third edition 1852). He also edited John Brinkley's Astronomy (Dublin, 1836), and was associated with W. R. Hamilton in many of his publications.

== Personal life ==
He married first Mary Anne Wetherall, niece of General Sir Frederick Wetherall, K.C.B., and secondly Jane Rathborne of Dunsina, and had six sons and four daughters. He was the uncle of the Irish nationalist revolutionary Thomas Clarke Luby.

He died in Dublin on 12 June 1870, and was buried at Aberystwyth.

== Attribution ==
- This article incorporates text from a publication now in the public domain: "Luby, Thomas". Dictionary of National Biography. London: Smith, Elder & Co. 1885–1900.
