= Vincent Comerford =

Richard Vincent Comerford, known generally as Vincent Comerford, is a professor of Irish history at the National University of Ireland, Maynooth who retired in January 2010. Comerford graduated from St. Patrick's College, (NUI) Maynooth, BA(1965) and MA (1971), followed by a PhD from Trinity College Dublin in 1977. He was appointed Professor of Modern History at Maynooth in 1989.

He is on the consultative committee of the Irish Historical Society, a board member of the Irish Research Council for the Humanities and Social Sciences (IRCHSS). and principal investigator at the Associational Culture in Ireland Database.

== Bibliography ==
- Charles J. Kickham: A Study in Irish Nationalism and Literature (Dublin: Wolfhound 1979)
- The Fenians in context: Irish politics and society 1848–82 (Dublin, 1985)
- The National Question (2000)
- Ireland Inventing the Nation Bloomsbury Academic (2003) Arnold, London (2003) ISBN 978-0-340-73112-3

=== Co-authored books ===
- Irishness in a Changing Society Monaco; The Princess Grace Irish Library (1989), chapter 1 - R.V. Comerford, Political Myths In Modern Ireland.
- Religion, Conflict and Coexistence in Ireland by R.V. Comerford, Mary Cullen, Jacqueline Hill, and Colm Lennon (1990)

=== Dedicated book ===
- Ireland's Polemical Past; Views of Irish History in honour of RV Comerford ed. T. Dooley; University College Dublin Press (2010)
