= John O'Leary (Fenian) =

Irish separatist and leading Fenian

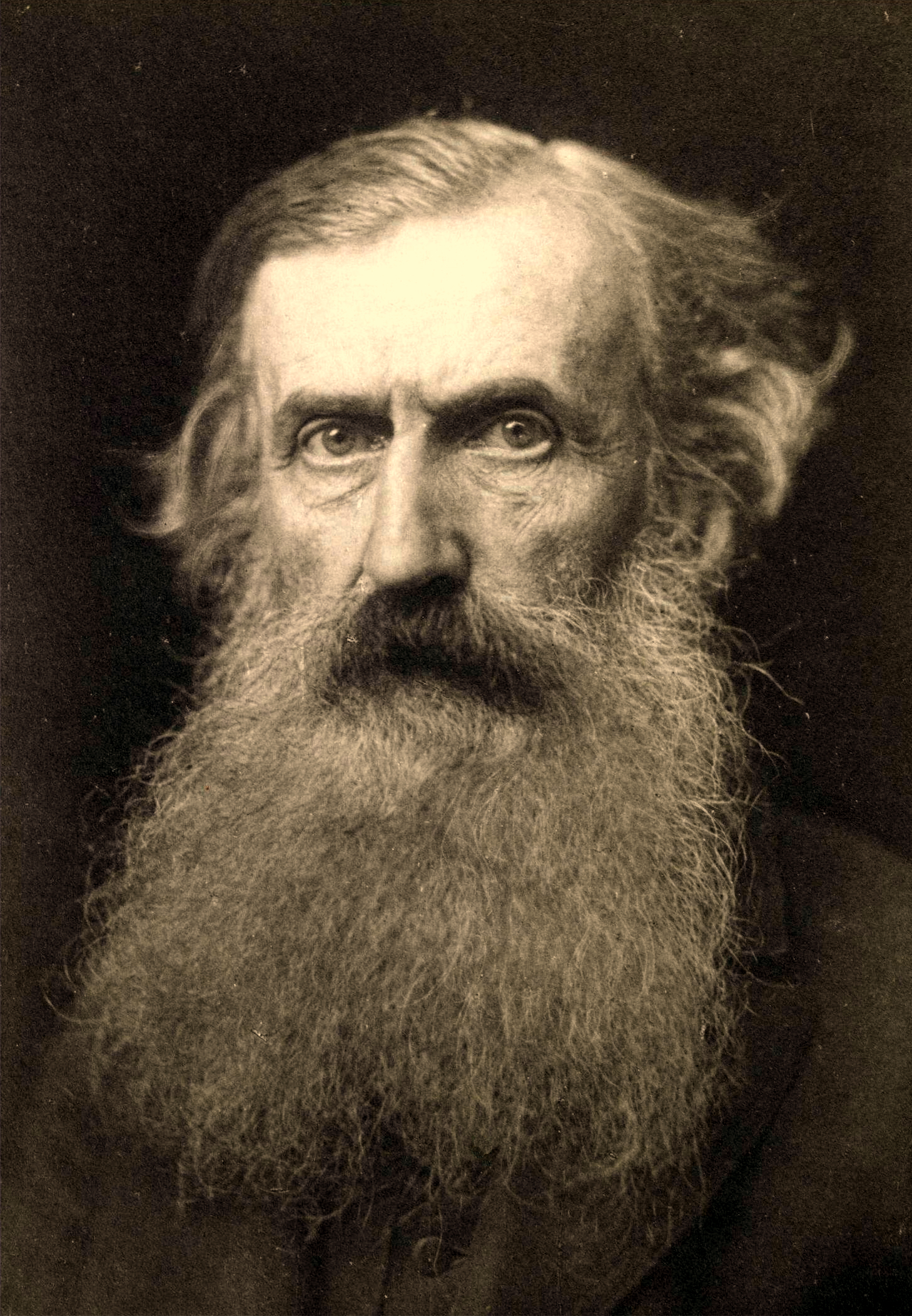
- O'Leary, 1900

President of the Irish Republican Brotherhood
- In office 1891 – 16 March 1907
- Preceded by: John O'Connor Power
- Succeeded by: Neal O'Boyle

Personal details
- Born: May 23, 1830 Tipperary, County Tipperary, Ireland
- Died: March 16, 1907 (aged 76)
- Occupation: Irish Republican

John O'Leary (23 July 1830 – 16 March 1907) was an Irish separatist and a leading Fenian. He studied both law and medicine but did not take a degree and for his involvement in the Irish Republican Brotherhood, he was imprisoned for five years in England during the nineteenth century.

== Early life ==
Born in the town of Tipperary, County Tipperary, the Catholic O'Leary was educated at the local Protestant Grammar School, The Abbey School, and later the Catholic Carlow College. He identified with the views advocated by Thomas Davis and met James Stephens in 1846.

He began his studies in law at Trinity College, Dublin, in 1847, where, through the Grattan Club, he associated with Charles Gavan Duffy, James Fintan Lalor and Thomas Francis Meagher.

== 1848 rising ==
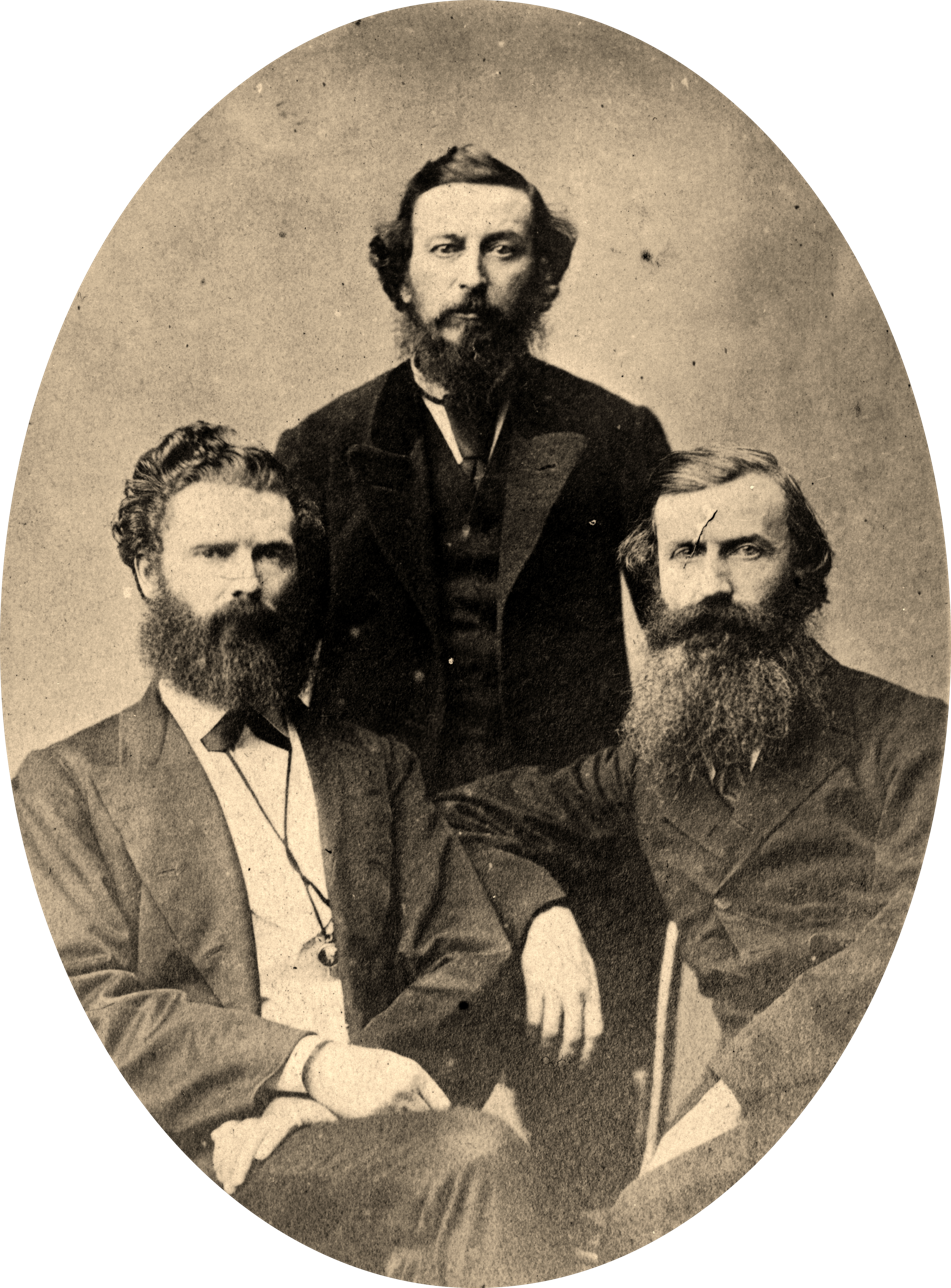
Denis Dowling Mulcahy, Thomas Clarke Luby and John O'Leary

After the failure of the 1848 Tipperary Revolt, O'Leary attempted to rescue the Young Ireland leaders from Clonmel Gaol, and was himself imprisoned for a week from 8 September 1849. He took part in a further attempted uprising in Cashel on 16 September 1849, but this proved abortive.

== Irish Republican Brotherhood ==
O'Leary abandoned his study of law at Trinity College because he was unwilling to take the oath of allegiance required of a barrister. He enrolled at Queen's College, Cork in 1850, to study medicine, later moved to Queen's College, Galway, then on to further studies at Meath Hospital, Dublin, in Paris and in London. In 1855, he visited Paris, where he became acquainted with Kevin Izod O'Doherty, John Martin and the American painter, James Abbott McNeill Whistler. O'Leary subsequently became financial manager of the newly formed Irish Republican Brotherhood (IRB), and was joint editor of the IRB paper The Irish People.

== Arrest and trial ==
On 16 September 1865, O'Leary was arrested, and later tried on charges of high treason, reduced to 'treason felony'. He was sentenced to twenty years' penal servitude, of which five years were spent in English prisons, prior to his release and exile in January 1871. During his exile, he lived mainly in Paris, also visiting the United States, remained active in the IRB and its associated organisations, and wrote many letters to newspapers and journals.

== Later life in Dublin ==
On the expiry of his 20-year prison term and therefore of the conditions associated with his release in 1885, he returned to Ireland. He and his sister, the poet Ellen O'Leary, both became important figures within Dublin cultural and nationalist circles, which included W. B. Yeats, Maud Gonne, Rose Kavanagh, Rosa Mulholland, George Sigerson, and Katharine Tynan. He also functioned as an elder statesman of the separatist movement, being active in the Young Ireland Society, and acted as president of the Irish Transvaal Committee, which supported the Boer side in the Boer War.

In 1898, O'Leary was selected as chair of the Dublin commemoration committee for the centenary of the 1798 Rebellion. In this capacity he laid the foundation stone to an ultimately aborted Wolfe Tone memorial at the Grafton Street corner of St Stephen's Green on 15 August 1898.

== Political outlook ==
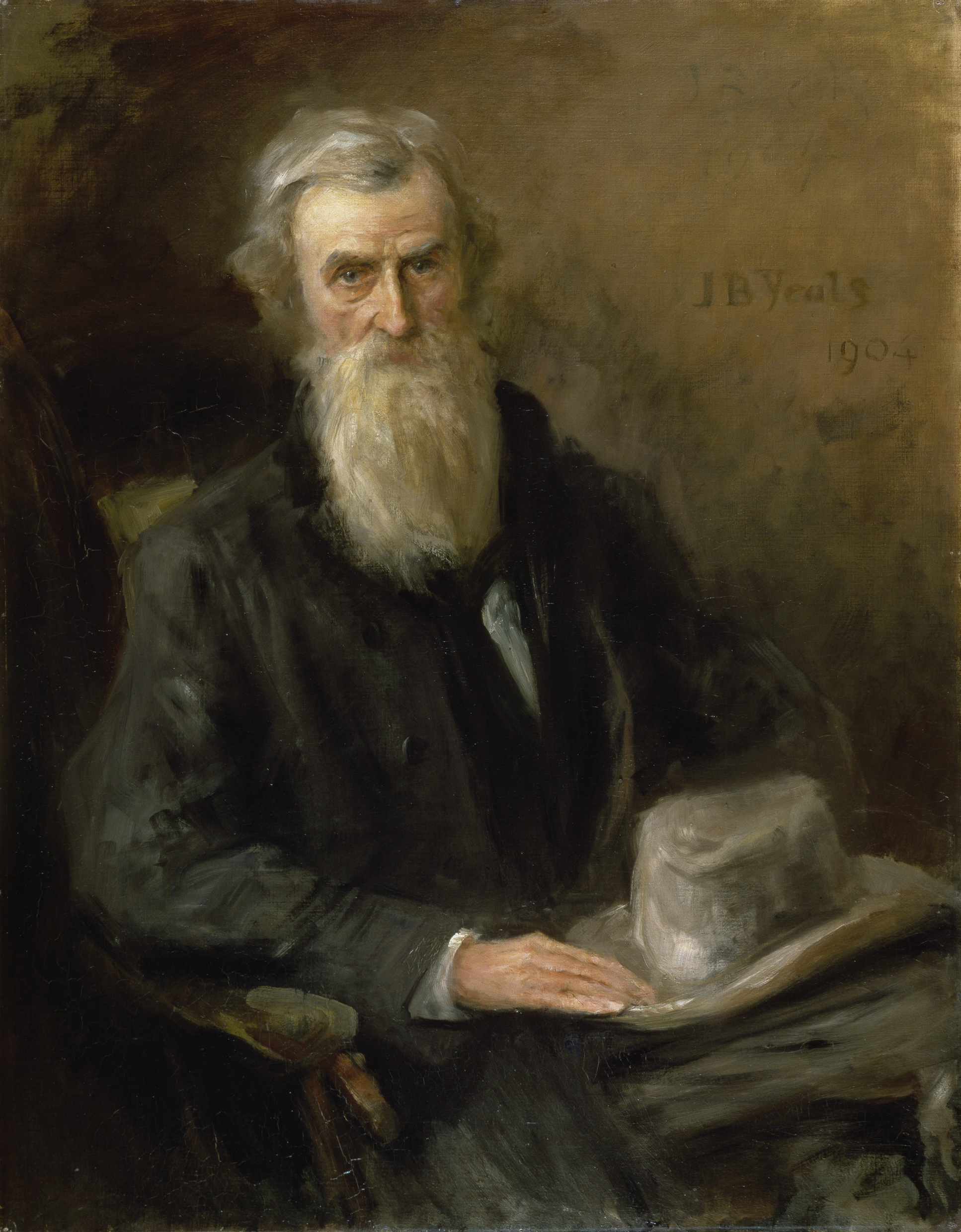
Portrait of John O'Leary by John Butler Yeats, 1904

O'Leary was a separatist, believing in complete Irish independence from Britain. However, he was not a republican but a constitutional monarchist. He believed in physical force, but was opposed to individual acts of violence such as those promoted by O'Donovan Rossa with his Skirmishing Fund, believing that revolutionary action should be thoroughly prepared. He was strongly opposed to the land agitation promoted by Michael Davitt and Parnell. For most of his life, he was opposed to any form of parliamentary action, being particularly hostile to the former Fenian M.P. John O'Connor Power. However, he supported Parnell during the early days of the Split of 1890–91. He was a secularist, believing that the Church should stay out of politics. In an article published in the Dublin University Review in 1886, he showed some awareness that Protestants would require guarantees of their liberties within an independent Ireland. Like most intellectuals of his generation, he was not interested in the Irish language, although sympathetic to organisations of the Gaelic revival of the 1880s onwards.

== Personal life ==
O'Leary never married, although he had an early love affair with a young woman, who is thought to have later entered a convent. He acted as best man for James Stephens, in 1864. He was brought up Catholic, but abandoned the religion for all of his life, until close to his death, when he was reconciled to the church, around Christmas 1906. He inherited property from his family in the town of Tipperary. For most of his life, this provided a reasonably comfortable income, so that he did not have to earn money and was able to assist fellow separatists financially. However, he did become a victim of agitation during the Plan of Campaign in 1889–91, when rental payments to him largely ceased. He was remembered in the town of Tipperary as a 'hard landlord'. He was succeeded as IRB leader by Neal O'Boyle from Antrim.

== Yeats' Tribute ==
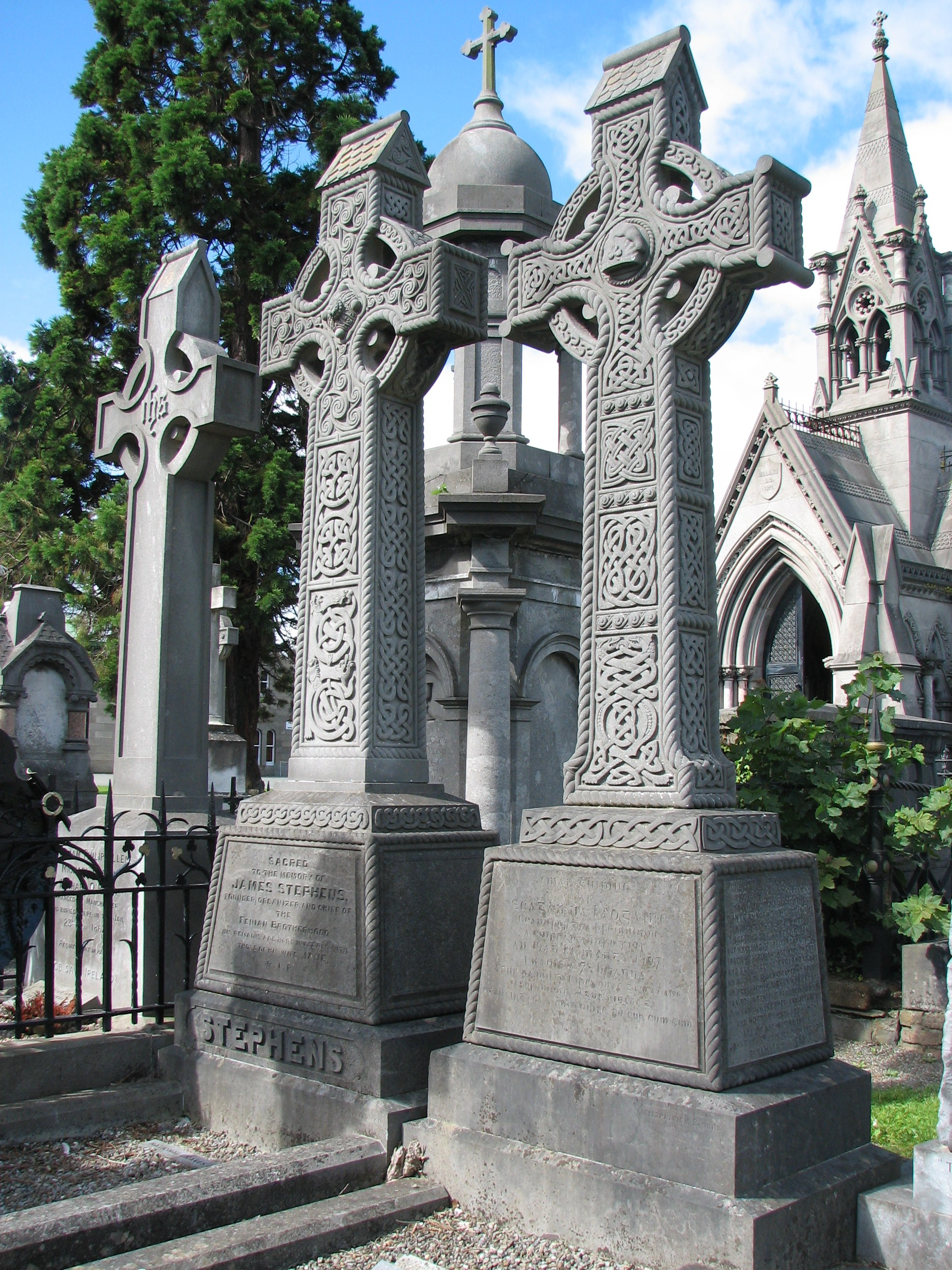
Stephens and O'Leary buried side by side

In his poem, "September 1913", the poet W.B.Yeats laments the death of O'Leary with the repeated lines:

"Romantic Ireland's dead and gone;
It's with O'Leary in the grave."

He also mentions O'Leary in his poem "Beautiful Lofty Things":

"Beautiful lofty things: O'Leary's noble head;"

== Works ==
- Young Ireland: The Old and the New (1885)
- Recollections of Fenians and Fenianism, 2 vols, London, 1896

== Sources ==
- Bourke, Marcus, John O'Leary: A Study in Irish Separatism, Tralee, Anvil Books, 1967
- Dr. Mark F. Ryan,Fenian Memories, Edited by T.F. O'Sullivan, M. H. Gill & Son, LTD, Dublin, 1945
- John O'Leary, Recollections of Fenians and Fenianism, Downey & Co., Ltd, London, 1896 (Vol. I & II)
- Leon Ó Broin, Fenian Fever: An Anglo-American Delemma, Chatto & Windus, London, 1971, ISBN 0-7011-1749-4.
- Ryan, Desmond. The Fenian Chief: A Biography of James Stephens, Hely Thom LTD, Dublin, 1967
- Four Years of Irish History 1845–1849, Sir Charles Gavan Duffy, Cassell, Petter, Galpin & Co. 1888.
- Christy Campbell, Fenian Fire: The British Government Plot to Assassinate Queen Victoria, HarperCollins, London, 2002, ISBN 0-00-710483-9
- Owen McGee, The IRB: The Irish Republican Brotherhood from The Land League to Sinn Féin, Four Courts Press, 2005, ISBN 1-85182-972-5
- Speeches From the Dock, or Protests of Irish Patriotism, by Seán Ua Cellaigh, Dublin, 1953

Preceded by John O'Connor Power	President of the Irish Republican Brotherhood; 1885–1907	Succeeded by Neal O'Boyle
