= Griffith Barracks =

Former military barracks, Dublin, Ireland

- Dún Uí Ghríofa
- Dublin
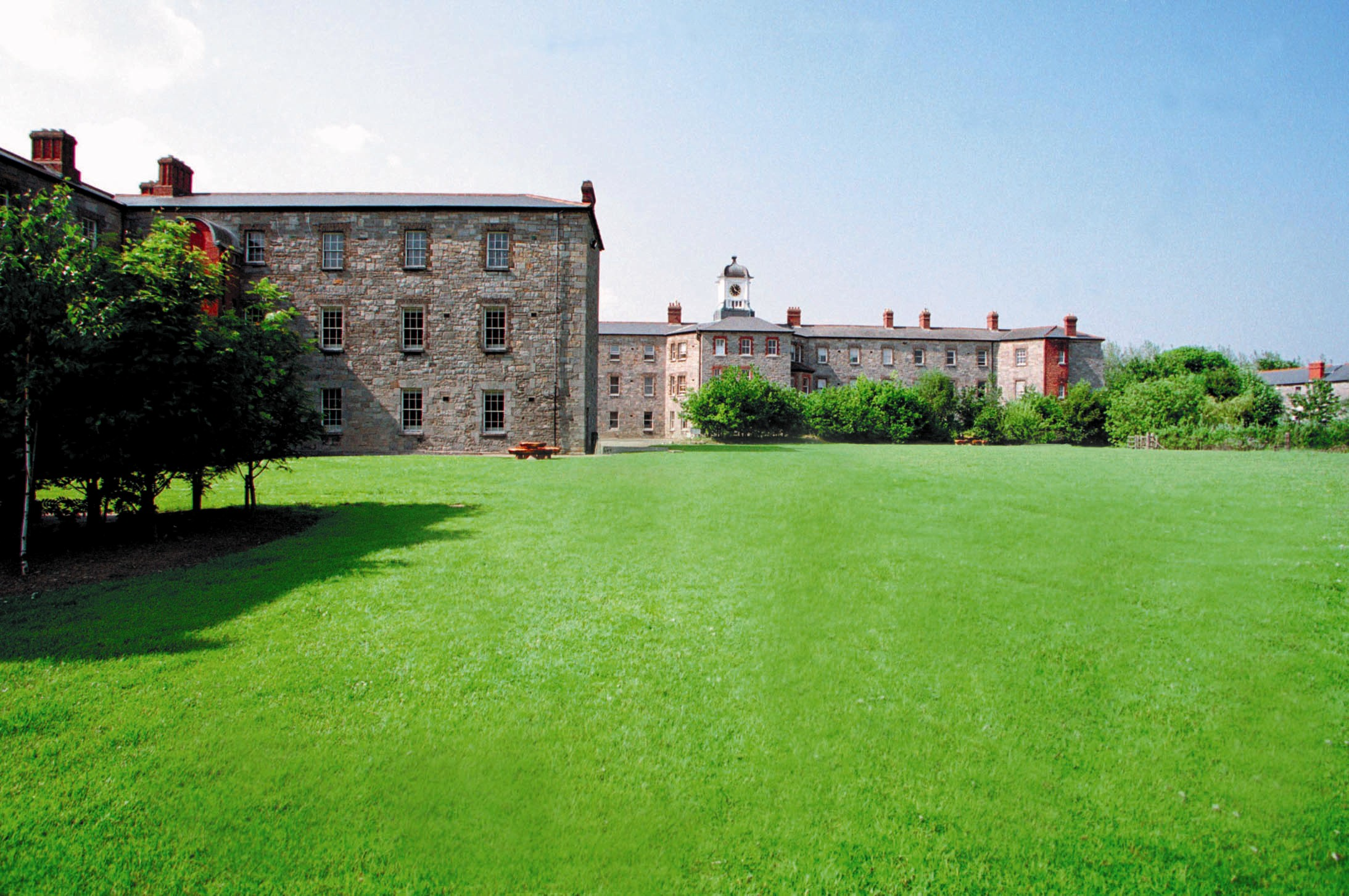
- Griffith Barracks which is now a College

Site information
- Type: Barracks
- Operator: (Republic of Ireland) Irish Army (United Kingdom) British Army

Location
- Location within Central Dublin
- Coordinates: 53.33111°N 6.27861°W

Site history
- Built: 1892
- Built for: War Office
- In use: 1892-1992

Griffith Barracks (Irish: Dún Uí Ghríofa) is a former military barracks on the South Circular Road, Dublin, Ireland. Built on the site of what was known as the Richmond Bridewell during the early 19th century, the barracks became known as Wellington Barracks in the late 19th century. Following the Irish War of Independence, it was named Arthur Griffith. The barracks closed in the late 20th century.

== History ==
=== Remand prison and Richmond Bridewell ===
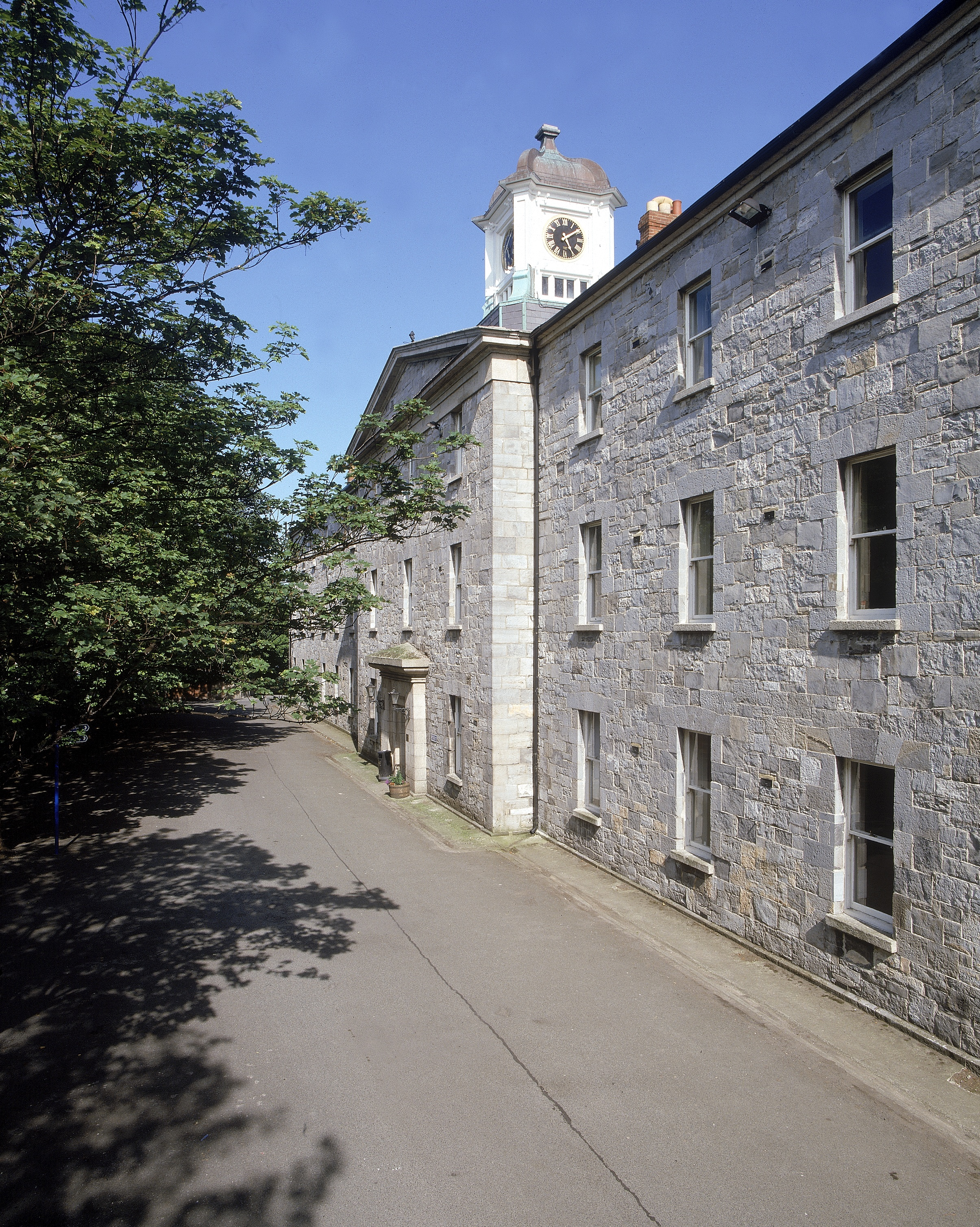
Barracks buildings

The site, which had been known as Grimswoods Nurseries, was developed as a remand prison, designed by Francis Johnston to relieve pressure on the Newgate Prison, Dublin and completed in 1813.

On the reorganisation of the government following Thomas Drummond's appointment in 1835 as Under-Secretary for Ireland, it became a male penitentiary known as the Richmond Bridewell. The motto above the door read "Cease to do evil; learn to do well".

In 1844 it was linked with Catholic emancipation and the subsequent movement for Repeal of the Act of Union: one of its most famous occupants was the Liberator, Daniel O'Connell. Prominent Irish Nationalist leaders such as William Smith O'Brien, Thomas Francis Meagher (later Acting Governor of Montana) and James Stephens (founder of the IRB) were among its famous historical prisoners. Another distinguished inmate was the Lord Mayor of Dublin, Timothy Daniel Sullivan, for publishing The Nation, an Irish nationalist newspaper, in 1887.

=== Wellington Barracks ===
In 1877, it was transferred to the War Office. The additions and extensions were completed by 11 November 1893 but prior to that, in summer 1892 a battalion of the Royal Munster Fusiliers was in occupation. In this era it was known as "Wellington Barracks" after the Duke of Wellington. During the First World War it was used as a recruiting and training centre for many of the soldiers being sent to fight in that war.

The barracks was not attacked during the 1916 rising. The British garrison of fewer than 100 men, who were under strength and poorly armed, dispatched one patrol and lost one soldier in the action.

The barracks became one of the first to be handed over to the Irish Free State and was garrisoned by the new Irish Army on 15 April 1922. During the subsequent Irish Civil War (1922-1923), the barracks was attacked by the Anti-Treaty IRA, in an incident in which five people were killed. On 8 November 1922, Anti-Treaty fighters fired on troops drilling in the main square at the barracks from positions across the Grand Canal, using Lewis and Thompson machine guns and rifles. One soldier was killed and fourteen injured (seven seriously), two civilians were also killed and many injured. Free State reinforcements were rushed from Portobello Barracks (now Cathal Brugha), and two of the IRA attackers were killed and six captured, along with a machine gun. In reprisal for the attack, a Republican, James Spain, was killed. He may have taken part in the attack on the barracks and was wounded in the leg. Two hours after the action, he was pursued by Free State troops, taken out of a nearby house on nearby Donore Avenue and summarily executed.

=== Griffith Barracks ===
The barracks was later renamed "Griffith Barracks" by the Army Council in honour of Arthur Griffith.

In 1937, part of the barracks was leased to the Irish Athletic Boxing Association as the site for the National Stadium which was opened by Frank Aiken.

The last soldiers left the barracks and transferred to Cathal Brugha Barracks in September 1988. The refurbishment of buildings for educational use as Griffith College Dublin began in Summer 1991. The Griffith Barracks Multi-Denominational School was officially opened by President Mary McAleese in April 1998.

== See also ==
- List of Irish military installations

== Sources ==
- Dorney, John (2013). Griffith College Dublin. A History of the Campus 1813-2013 (PDF). Griffith College Dublin. ISBN 978-1906878078.
