= George Owen Starr =

- Starr in the uniform of a Colonel in the Union Army, c. 1862–1865
- Born: c. 1836
- Died: September 29, 1897 (aged 60–61); Most likely Indiana, US
- Burial place: Marion National Cemetery
- Military career
- Allegiance: United States, Union, Fenian Brotherhood
- Service years: 1861–1865 (United States/Union) 1866-1870 (Fenian Brotherhood)
- Rank: Colonel
- Unit: 2nd Kentucky Cavalry Regiment
- Conflicts: American Civil War; Atlanta Campaign; McCook’s Raid; Campaign of the Carolinas; Fenian Raids; Battle of Ridgeway; Battle of Fort Erie; Battle of Trout River

George Owen Starr (c. 1836 – September 29, 1897) was an American mechanical artisan, a decorated Civil War officer in the Union Army, and a prominent commander in the Fenian Brotherhood's armed struggle against British Rule in Canada.

== Early life ==
George Owen Starr was born in 1836 within the United States. Prior to the outbreak of the American Civil War, he trained and worked as a skilled mechanic and foundry worker, eventually settling in Kentucky.

== American Civil War ==
Following the outbreak of hostilities in 1861, Starr volunteered for service in the Union Army. He was mustered into the 2nd Kentucky Cavalry Regiment and subsequently rose through every primary officer rank within the regiment, eventually becoming a Colonel on May 1, 1865.

During his tenure with the 2nd Kentucky Cavalry, Starr participated in major Western Theater operations, including the Atlanta campaign—where the unit took part in McCook's Raid—and the subsequent Campaign of the Carolinas. He was honorably mustered out of federal service alongside his regiment on July 17, 1865.

== Fenian activity ==
Following his retirement from the Union Army, Starr committed his military background to the Fenian Brotherhood, an Irish-American revolutionary movement aiming to seize Canadian territory to leverage against Great Britain for Irish independence. On March 19, 1866, he was officially commissioned as a Colonel in the 17th Regiment (Louisville, Kentucky) of the Army of the Irish Republic.

=== 1866 raid ===
In late May 1866, Starr mobilized approximately 150 Fenian volunteers from Louisville, traveling by rail to Buffalo, New York. In the early morning hours of June 1, 1866, Starr commanded the advance vanguard party that crossed the Niagara River into Ontario ahead of the main force led by Colonel John O'Neill. Starr's detachment successfully captured the village of Fort Erie, severed local telegraph lines, dismantled railway infrastructure, and captured six sentries of the Royal Canadian Rifles.

=== 1870 raid ===
Starr took up arms again during the May 1870 Fenian incursions. He led an invasion column out of Malone, New York, crossing the border toward Holbrook's Corners along the Trout River. His force was quickly engaged and overwhelmed by over 1,000 British and Canadian troops, forcing a rapid retreat back across the United States border. Following the engagement, Starr was arrested by United States marshals for violating the Neutrality Act and was imprisoned in Auburn, New York.

== Later life and death ==
Upon his release from prison, Starr returned to civilian life as a molder and industrial artisan. He later relocated to St. Louis, Missouri, where he spent his final working years employed as the superintendent of a commercial stove foundry.

Starr died on September 29, 1897, at the age of 60 or 61. As a veteran of the Civil War, he was interred at the Marion National Cemetery in Marion, Indiana (Section 1, Grave 281).

== See also ==
- Fenian Raids
- Kentucky in the American Civil War
