= John O'Neill (Fenian) =

Officer in the American Civil War & member of the Fenian Brotherhood (1834–1878)

- John O’Neill in his captains uniform of the 17th United States Colored Infantry, c. 1864
- Born: March 9, 1834; County Monaghan, Ireland
- Died: January 8, 1878 (aged 43); Omaha, Nebraska, United States
- Spouse: Mary Crow
- Military career
- Allegiance: Fenian Brotherhood; United States Army
- Rank: Captain (Union Army); Colonel (Fenian Brotherhood)
- Units: 2nd United States Dragoons (1857–1858); 1st Cavalry Regiment (1861–1862); 5th Indiana Cavalry Regiment (1862–1863); 17th United States Colored Infantry (1863–1865)
- Conflicts: Utah War; American Civil War; Peninsular Campaign; Battle of Antietam; Morgan’s Raid; Battle of Buffington Island; Siege of Knoxville (WIA); Fenian Raids; Battle of Ridgeway; Battle of Fort Erie; Battle of Eccles Hill; Battle of Trout River (POW); Pembina Raid (POW)

John Charles O'Neill (9 March 1834 – 8 January 1878) was an Irish-born officer in the American Civil War and member of the Fenian Brotherhood. O'Neill is best known for his activities leading the Fenian raids on Canada in 1866 and 1871.

== Early life ==
O'Neill was born in Drumgallan, Clontibret County Monaghan, where he received some schooling. He emigrated to New Jersey in 1848 at the height of the Great Famine. He received an additional year of education there and worked in a number of jobs. In 1857 he enlisted in the 2nd United States Dragoons and served in the Utah War (May 1857 – July 1858), apparently deserting afterwards to California.

== Civil war service ==
In California, he joined the 1st Cavalry, and served as a sergeant in the American Civil War with this regiment until December 1862, at which time he was commissioned as an officer in the 5th Indiana Cavalry. He was credited as being a daring fighting officer, but believed he had not received due promotion, which led to a transfer to the 17th United States Colored Infantry as captain. He left the Union Army prior to the end of the conflict, marrying Mary Crow, with whom he had several children.

== Fenian activity ==
While in Tennessee, O'Neill joined the militant Irish-American movement, the Fenian Brotherhood, which eschewed politics in favor of militant action to bring an end to British rule in Ireland. He attached himself to the group led by William Randall Roberts, who wished to attack Canada.

=== Battle of Ridgeway ===
O'Neill, ranked as colonel, travelled to the Canada–US border with a group from Nashville to participate in the Fenian raids. The assigned commander of the expedition did not appear, so O'Neill took command. On 1 June 1866, he led a group of six hundred men across the Niagara River and occupied Fort Erie.

The following day, north of Ridgeway, Canada West, O'Neill's group encountered a detached column of Canadian volunteers, commanded by Lieutenant-Colonel Alfred Booker (mainly formed of the Queen's Own Rifles of Toronto and the 13th Battalion of Hamilton). The inexperienced Canadians were routed by the Civil War veterans. O'Neill withdrew back to Fort Erie and fought a battle against a detachment led by John Stoughton Dennis. With overwhelming numbers of Canadian forces closing in, O'Neill oversaw a successful evacuation on the night of 2–3 June back to US territory. He was later charged with violating the neutrality laws of the US, but it was dropped.

The Dictionary of Canadian Biography states that

Ridgeway made O'Neill a Fenian hero. He had won the only success the Fenians ever achieved in their numerous enterprises against Canada. He had handled his force well, and it should be added that he had kept his men under strict control and that there was little looting or disorder. The episode shortly led to the Roberts party of the Fenian Brotherhood appointing him "inspector general of the Irish Republican Army." He took Roberts' place as president at the end of 1867.

=== Pembina Raid ===
However, the split between two factions of the Fenians remained, and penetration of O'Neill's organization by Canadian spies ensured that his next venture into Canada in 1870 (see Battle of Eccles Hill) was known in advance, and Canada was accordingly prepared. After the Battle of Trout River ended in a disorganized rout, O'Neill was arrested by United States Marshal George P. Foster and charged with violating neutrality laws. That led to O'Neill's imprisonment in July 1870 – he was sentenced to two years – but he and other Fenians were pardoned by President Ulysses S. Grant that October.

Though he renounced the idea of further attacks on Canada, he changed his mind at the urging of an associate of Louis Riel, William Bernard O'Donoghue. With the latter, and without the backing of the bulk of the Fenians, he led an attack on the Hudson's Bay Company's post at Pembina, Dakota Territory, on 5 October 1871. He was arrested by American troops.

== Later life, death and legacy ==
O'Neill was working for a firm of land speculators in Holt County, Nebraska, in January 1878, when he died of a paralytic stroke; the county seat of Holt County, O'Neill, being named in his honor.

While O'Neill became a hero for many Irish-American nationalists, he was viewed in Canada as an archetypal villain.

Statue of O’Neill unveiled in Nebraska in 2022
