= Battle of Trout River =

- Part of the Fenian Raids
Date	27 May 1870
Location	Huntingdon, Quebec, Canada
Result	Canadian victory; Fenian retreat; Capture and arrest of John O'Neill

Belligerents
Fenian Brotherhood	Canada; (United Kingdom of Great Britain and Ireland) United Kingdom

Commanders and leaders
John O'Neill (POW); Owen Starr	(United Kingdom of Great Britain and Ireland) George Bagot

Strength
Unknown	Three units of Canadian volunteers; 500 British regulars of the 69th Regiment of Foot

Casualties and losses
1 dead, 1 wounded, 1 captured (by civilians)	1 slightly wounded

The Battle of Trout River was a military conflict that occurred on 27 May 1870. It was a part of the Fenian raids. This battle occurred outside of Huntingdon, Quebec, Canada, near the international border about 20 kilometres (12 mi) north of Malone, New York, United States. The location of this battle should not be confused with Trout River in the Northwest Territories.

== Before the battle ==
The Fenians, an extremist group of Irish Republicans, were under the command of General John O'Neill and General Owen Starr, and the Canadians were under Colonel George Bagot of the British 69th Regiment of Foot. The day before, the Fenians had crossed the border to build several positions, which were apparently well chosen and built. However, due to lack of reinforcements, they crossed back onto American soil. At 7 in the morning of May 27, Starr initiated the conflict after receiving more troops, by crossing the Trout River and establishing a position on "the right and left roads, with his extreme right resting on the Trout River." His force rested behind a post and rail fence which he added to the existing works. To this was added a very reliable route for retreat.

== Canadian troops advance ==
Three units of Canadian soldiers were ordered to march from Huntingdon Village, where they were stationed. These three units included 225 to 240 soldiers of the 50th Battalion (Huntingdon Borderers), 275 to 300 soldiers of the Montreal Garrison Artillery, and 70 to 88 members of the Montreal Engineers, which were accompanied by 500 soldiers of the 69th (South Lincolnshire) Regiment of Foot British Regulars. The entire force marched along the road towards Holbrook's Corners to meet the Fenians. At Hendersonville, part of the Montreal Garrison Artillery was sent to flank the Fenian positions. The rest of the force proceeded towards a frontal engagement.

== Engagement at Holbrook's Corners ==
The 50th Battalion (Huntingdon Borderers) formed an advance guard for the Canadian forces and advanced within 300 yards of the Fenians when they deployed to assault. The Fenian advance guard had a very strong position, which they held for several minutes. The British and Canadian troops advanced out of the woods by the river, firing as they moved. Said one observer, "It was not an intermittent fire, but one continuous fusillade". Starr told his own men to fire for 10 minutes. They held the advance for several minutes until Canadian forces moved to flank the Fenian position. At this, Starr formed up and retreated in order to the United States border, where they crossed. The Fenians denied they were defeated in any way and had simply redeployed. At this time it is also mentioned that up to 1,000 Fenians were in New York and more were expected.

== Aftermath ==
Shortly after his return to the United States, O'Neill was placed under arrest by George P. Foster, United States Marshal for Vermont and a former Union Army general, and charged with violating neutrality laws.

General Starr, from Louisville, Kentucky, disappeared in the immediate aftermath of the skirmish, was eventually located and tried, and served time in prison in Auburn, New York. Starr had also been involved in the Battle of Ridgeway.
