= 69th (South Lincolnshire) Regiment of Foot =

- Active: 10 December 1756–1 July 1881
- Country: Kingdom of Great Britain (1756–1800); United Kingdom (1801–1881)
- Branch: British Army
- Type: Infantry
- Size: One battalion (two battalions 1795–1796 and 1803–1816)
- Garrison/HQ: Maindy Barracks, Cardiff
- Nicknames: The Ups and Downs; The Old Agamemnons
- Engagements: Seven Years' War; Napoleonic Wars; Fenian raids

The 69th (South Lincolnshire) Regiment of Foot was an infantry regiment of the British Army, raised in 1756. Under the Childers Reforms it amalgamated with the 41st (Welch) Regiment of Foot to form the Welch Regiment in 1881.

== History ==
=== Formation ===
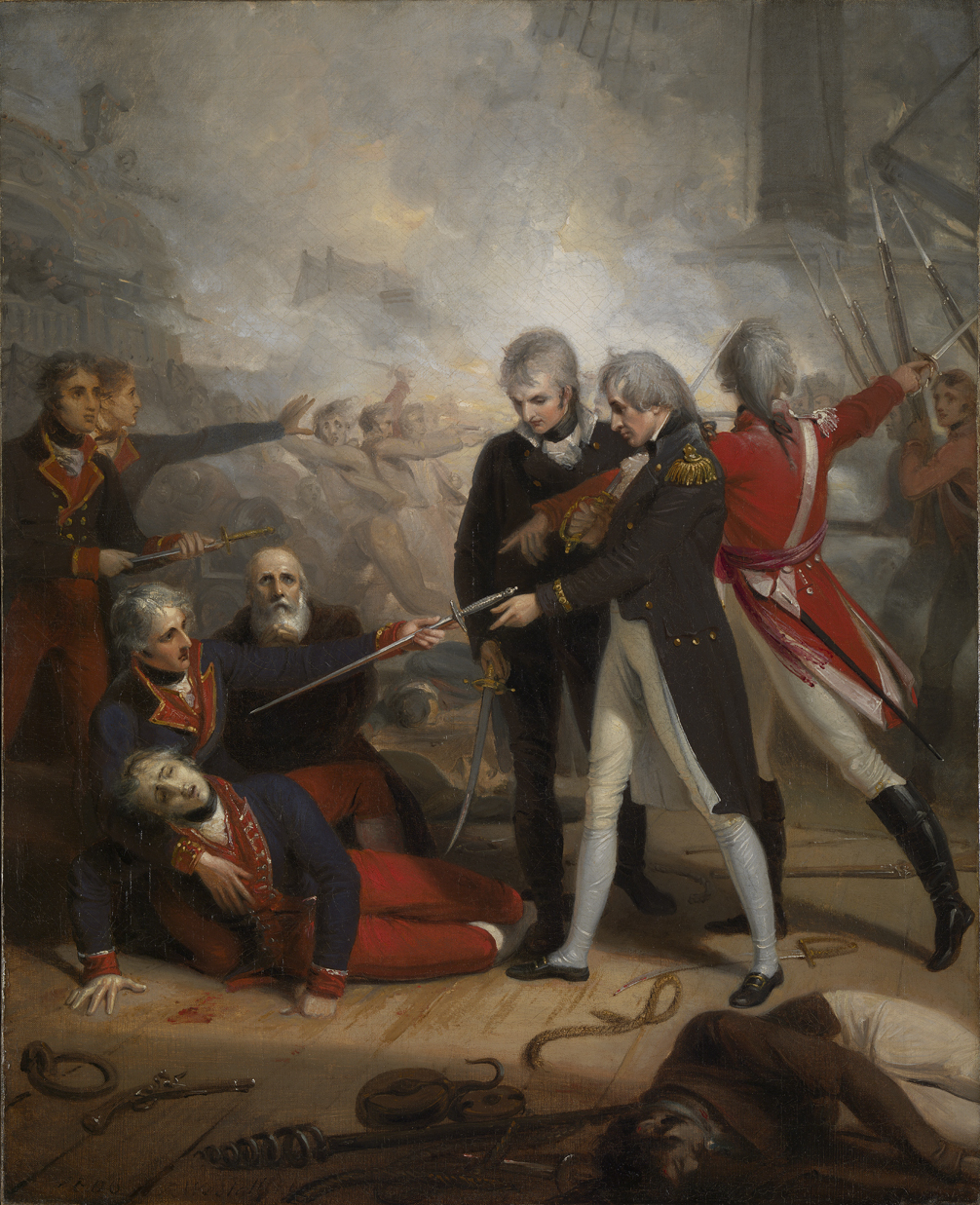
Regimental troops (right) at the Battle of Cape St. Vincent

The formation of the regiment was prompted by the expansion of the army as a result of the commencement of the Seven Years' War. On 25 August 1756 it was ordered that a number of existing regiments should raise a second battalion; among those chosen was the 24th Regiment of Foot. The 2nd Battalion of the 24th Regiment of Foot was formed on 10 December 1756 and renumbered as the 69th Regiment of Foot on 21 April 1758. The regiment took part in the Raid on St Malo in June 1758 and then formed part of a force which successfully captured Belle Île in spring 1761. It embarked for the West Indies later that year and took part in the Invasion of Martinique in January 1762 before returning home in 1763. The regiment returned to the West Indies in November 1781 and took part in the Battle of Saint Kitts in January 1782 and, while serving as marines, in the Battle of the Saintes in April 1782. In August 1782 the regiment took a county title as the 69th (South Lincolnshire) Regiment of Foot. The regiment returned home in 1785.

=== Napoleonic Wars ===
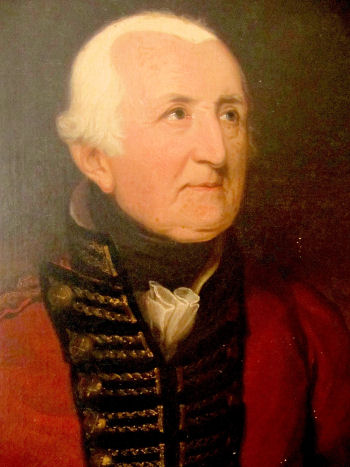
Cornelius Cuyler, the regimental colonel from 1794 to 1819

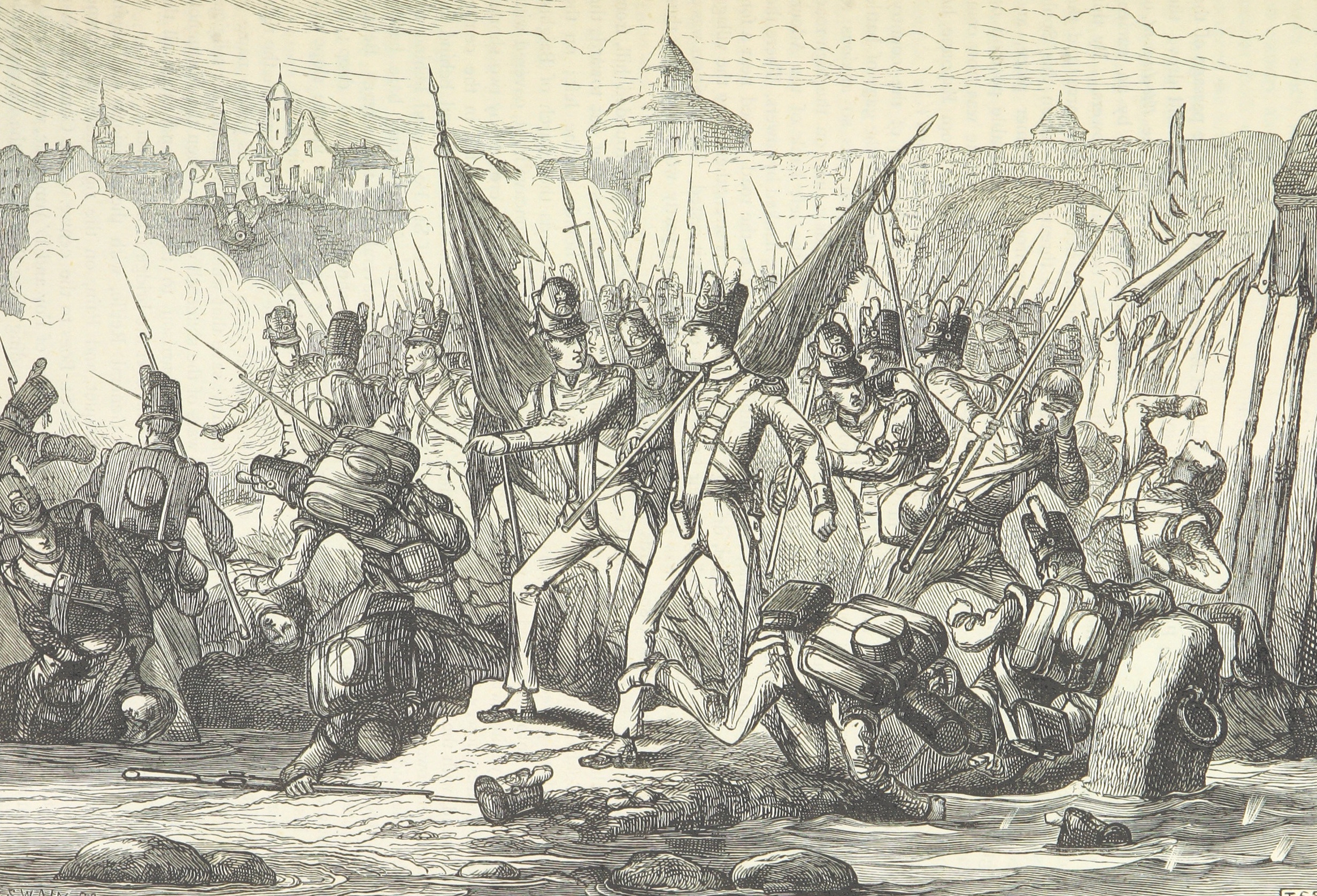
The siege of Bergen op Zoom, which the regiment fought in

Detachments from the regiment embarked as marines in early 1793 and were in combat on the third-rate HMS Leviathan at the capture of Toulon in December 1793, the attack on the Tour de Mortella in February 1794 and at the Glorious First of June in June 1794. They transferred to the third-rate HMS Agamemnon and served under Lord Nelson at the Battle of Genoa in March 1795, and then, after Nelson's transfer into the third-rate Captain in June 1796, with him at the Battle of Cape St Vincent in February 1797. At Cape St Vincent, Matthew Stevens, a soldier from the regiment, was the first to board the Spanish ship San Nicolas.

The main part of the regiment returned to the West Indies in 1796 to take part in a British invasion of Saint-Domingue, where almost half of them caught yellow fever. After returning home in 1798, the regiment took part in the Anglo-Russian invasion of Holland in August 1799. It moved to Jamaica in July 1800 and returned home again in June 1802.

A second battalion was raised in 1803. The 1st battalion embarked for India in 1805 and helped to suppress the Vellore mutiny in July 1806 and the Travancore Rebellion in spring 1809. It went on to see action during the Invasion of Île Bonaparte in July 1810, the Invasion of Isle de France in December 1810 and the Invasion of Java in August 1811.

Meanwhile the 2nd battalion embarked for the Netherlands in 1813 and took part in the Siege of Bergen op Zoom in March 1814. It served at the Battle of Quatre Bras and the Battle of Waterloo. At Quatre Bras the King's Colour was captured by the enemy and Lieutenant-Colonel Charles Morice, commanding officer of the battalion, was killed in a French cavalry charge. The two battalions amalgamated again in 1816.

=== The Victorian era ===
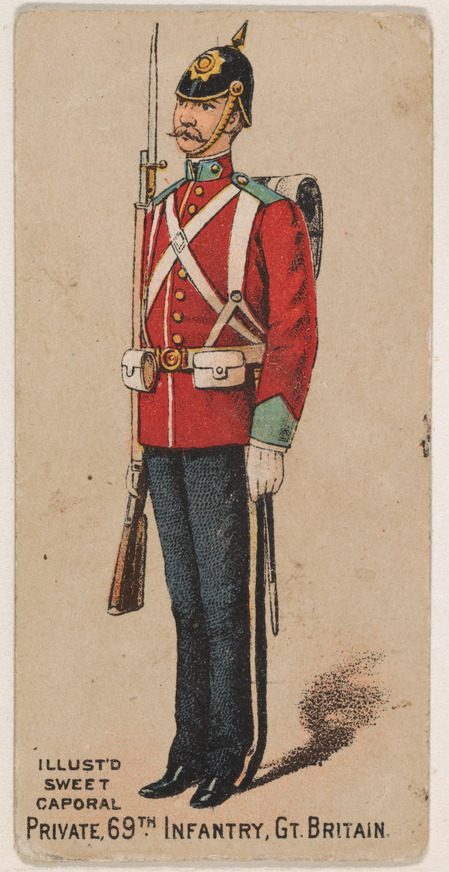
c. 1880 cigarette card of a regimental private

The regiment embarked for the West Indies in November 1831 and was stationed in Saint Vincent before moving to Demerara in 1835. It sailed for Halifax in Nova Scotia in January 1839 before returning home in September 1842. It arrived in Malta in December 1847 and then went on to Barbados in 1851 before returning to England in May 1857. It departed for Burma later that year and then went on to India in 1862 before returning home in May 1864. It embarked for Canada in August 1867 and while, under the command of Lieutenant Colonel George Bagot, helped to defeat a Fenian Raid at the Battle of Trout River in May 1870. It embarked for Bermuda later that year and moved to Gibraltar in 1873 before returning home in 1878.

As part of the Cardwell Reforms of the 1870s, where single-battalion regiments were linked together to share a single depot and recruiting district in the United Kingdom, the 69th was linked with the 41st (Welch) Regiment of Foot, and assigned to district no. 24 at Maindy Barracks in Cardiff. On 1 July 1881 the Childers Reforms came into effect and the regiment amalgamated with the 41st (Welch) Regiment of Foot to form the Welch Regiment.

== Traditions ==
The regiment's nickname "The Ups and Downs" is said to refer to its being composed of old veterans and raw recruits. Alternatively, it may come from the number, which reads the same upside down.

== Battle honours ==
Battle honours won by the regiment were:

Bourbon, Java, Waterloo, India

== Colonels of the Regiment ==
Colonels of the Regiment were:

=== 69th Regiment of Foot ===
- 1758–1775: Lt-Gen. Hon. Charles Colville
- 1775–1790: Lt-Gen. Hon. Philip Sherard

=== 69th (South Lincolnshire) Regiment of Foot - (1782) ===
- 1790–1792: Lt-Gen. Sir Ralph Abercromby, KB
- 1792–1794: Gen. Henry Watson Powell
- 1794–1819: Gen. Sir Cornelius Cuyler, 1st Baronet
- 1819–1823: Gen. William Carr Beresford, 1st Viscount Beresford, GCB, GCH
- 1823–1836: Lt-Gen. Sir John Hamilton, 1st Baronet, of Woodbrook, KCB, KCH
- 1836–1848: Gen. John Vincent
- 1848–1858: Gen. Sir Ralph Darling, GCH
- 1858–1876: Gen. Ernest Frederick Gascoigne
- 1876–1877: Gen. Sir William Montagu Scott McMurdo, GCB
- 1877–1881: Gen. David Elliot Mackirdy

== Sources ==
- Nofi, Albert A (2007). The Waterloo Campaign, June 1815. Da Capo Press. ISBN 978-0-306-81694-9.
- Perry, James (2005). Arrogant Armies: Great Military Disasters and the Generals Behind Them. Edison: Castle Books.
- Smyth, Major Robert (1870). Records of the Sixty-Ninth, or, South Lincolnshire regiment. Quebec. OCLC 890841745.
