= List of Fenian raids weapons =

This is a list of weapons during the Fenian raids

== United Kingdom and Canada ==
=== Rifles ===
- Pattern 1853 Enfield
- Snider–Enfield
- Spencer repeating rifle
- Ballard Rifle
- Sharp rifle
- Starr carbine

=== Side arms ===
- Colt 1851 Navy Revolver
- Colt M1861 Navy
- Webley RIC
- Tranter Revolver
- Beaumont-Adams revolver
- Adams Revolvers
- Colt Army Model 1860

== Fenians ==
=== Rifles ===
- Springfield Model 1861
- Fenian Needham Conversion Rifle
- Sharp rifle
- Spencer repeating rifle

=== Side arms ===
- Colt M1861 Navy
- Colt 1851 Navy Revolver
- Colt Army Model 1860
