= Pigeon Hill (St. Armand) =

Former village, now part of Saint-Armand, Quebec in Canada

Coordinates: 45°02′31″N 72°56′21″W

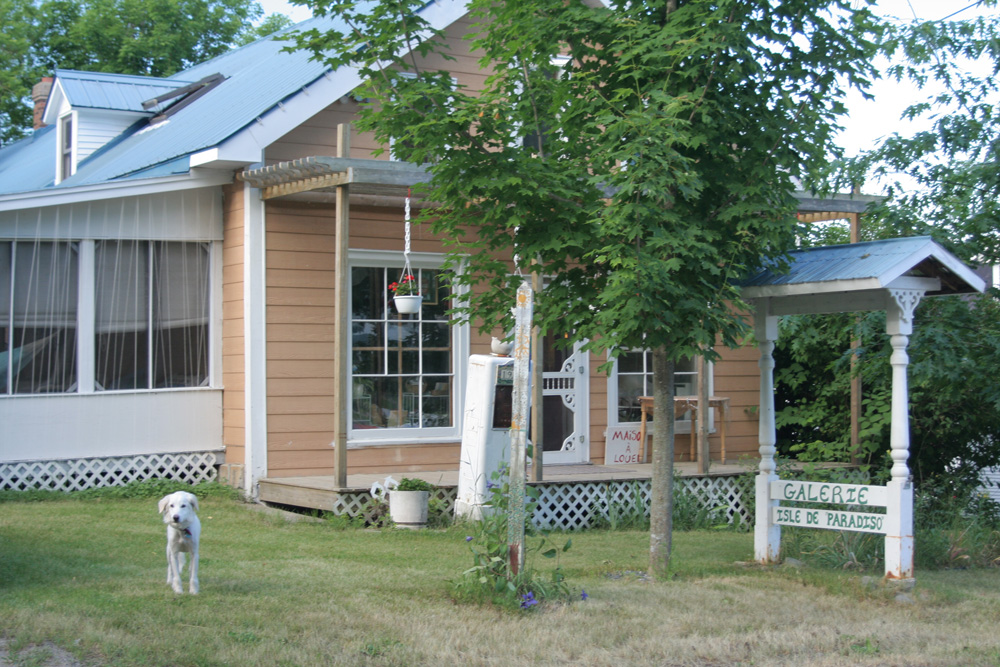
Pigeon Hill Old Country Store

Pigeon Hill is a former village that is now part of the municipality of Saint-Armand, Quebec, Canada, with 25 houses that look out over the farmlands of Quebec to the north and the hills of Vermont to the south. Just 3.2 kilometers or 2 miles from the United States border and about 80 kilometers from both Montreal, Quebec and Burlington, Vermont, the church and most of the houses are over 150 years old. The village was originally called Sagerfield to honor the Sager family.

Pigeon Hill residents were forced into hiding during the Fenian raids of 1866.
