= Fenian raids =

Irish republican military campaign in Canada (1866–1871)

Fenian Raids
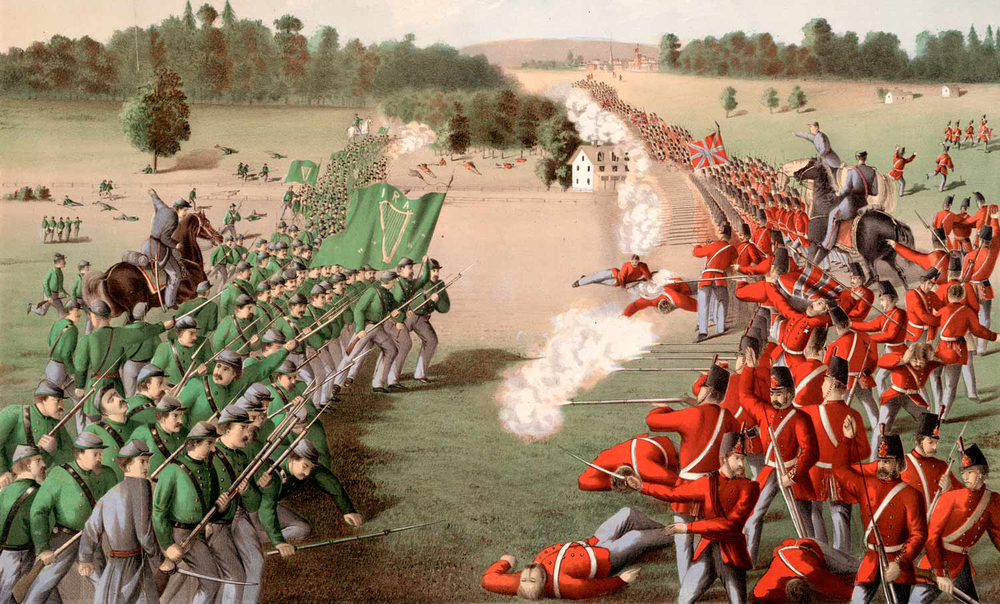
- Depiction of the Fenian charge during the Battle of Ridgeway
Date	April 1866 – October 1871
Location	Eastern Canada and Minnesota
Result	British-Canadian victory

Belligerents
Canada (Note: Raids that were carried out in 1866 (prior to Confederation in 1867) took place in the Province of Canada and the colony of New Brunswick.); United Kingdom	Fenian Brotherhood

Commanders and leaders
(Canada) John A. Macdonald (Canada) George-Étienne Cartier (Canada) J. Stoughton Dennis (Canada) William O. Smith	John O'Mahony; Thomas Sweeny; John O'Neill (POW); Samuel P. Spear; Owen Starr

Strength
Prior to invasion: (Canada); 10,000–14,000 local volunteers (March 1866); Start of war: (Canada): 20,000 Canadian Militia (May 1866); United Kingdom: 900 British Regulars (May 1866); 13 armed patrol steamboats; In 1870: 13,000	Start of war: 850 (May 1866); In 1870: 600; In 1871: 40

Casualties and losses
35 killed 53 wounded 54 captured Total: 142	24 killed 48 wounded 59 captured 1 cannon seized Total: 131

The Fenian raids were a series of incursions carried out by the Fenian Brotherhood, an Irish republican organization based in the United States, on military fortifications, customs posts, and other targets in Canada (called British North America until 1867) in 1866, and again from 1870 to 1871. A number of separate incursions by the Fenian Brotherhood into Canada were undertaken to bring pressure on the British government to withdraw from Ireland, although none of these raids achieved their aims.

While authorities in the United States arrested the men and confiscated the arms of the Fenian Brotherhood, there was speculation that some in the U.S. government ignored the preparations undertaken by the Fenians due to anger over British assistance to the Confederacy during the American Civil War. (Note: Most notably: British blockade runners carrying arms supplies, the construction of multiple Confederate warships including the commerce raider CSS Alabama, harboring Confederate diplomats, allowing Confederate intelligence agents to operate both within the UK and her overseas colonies, particularly Canada and the Bahamas.) The Fenian raids were one of the factors that led to Canadian Confederation, as the provinces united to face the threat of invasions.

== Raids ==
=== Early raids (1866) ===
==== Abortive raid from Dedham, Massachusetts ====
In Massachusetts, the Dedham chapter of the Fenian Brotherhood, which had offices in the Norfolk House, hosted a meeting at Temperance Hall in which a raid into Canada was organized. John R. Bullard, a recent Harvard Law School graduate, was elected moderator of the meeting and, having been swept up in his own sudden importance and fever of the meeting, ended his animated speech by asking "Who would be the first man to come forward and pledge himself to go to Canada and help free Ireland?" The first of the roughly dozen men to sign the "enlistment papers" were Patrick Donohoe and Thomas Golden. Thomas Brennan said he could not participate, but donated $50 to the cause. The meeting ended with the group singing "The Wearing of the Green." The raid was a failure. Some of the men got as far as St. Albans, Vermont, but none made it to Canada. U.S. authorities arrested a few, and some had to send home for money.

==== New Brunswick ====
This abortive Fenian raid occurred in April 1866, at Campobello Island, New Brunswick. A Fenian Brotherhood war party of over 700 members under the direction of Bernard Doran Killian arrived at the Maine shore opposite the island intending to seize Campobello from the British. Royal Navy officer Charles Hastings Doyle, stationed at Halifax, Nova Scotia, responded decisively. On 17 April, he left Halifax with several warships carrying over 700 British soldiers and proceeded to Passamaquoddy Bay, where the Fenian force was concentrated. This show of force discouraged the Fenians, and they dispersed. The invasion reinforced the idea of protection for New Brunswick by joining with the neighbouring colonies of Nova Scotia and the Province of Canada to form the new Dominion of Canada.

==== Canada West ====
After the Campobello raid, the "Presidential faction" led by Fenian founders James Stephens and John O'Mahony focused more on fundraising for rebels in Ireland. The more militant "Senate Faction" led by William R. Roberts believed that even a marginally successful invasion of the Province of Canada or other parts of British North America would provide them with leverage in their efforts. After the failure of the April attempt to raid New Brunswick, which had been blessed by O'Mahony, the Senate Faction implemented their own plan for invading Canada. Drafted by the senate "Secretary for War" General T. W. Sweeny, a distinguished former Union Army officer, the plan called for multiple invasions at points in Canada West (now southern Ontario) and Canada East (now southern Quebec) intended to cut Canada West off from Canada East and possible British reinforcements from there. Key to the plan was a diversionary attack at Fort Erie from Buffalo, New York, meant to draw troops away from Toronto in a feigned strike at the nearby Welland Canal system. This was the only Fenian attack, other than the Quebec raid several days later, which was launched in June 1866.

About 1000 to 1300 Fenians crossed the Niagara River in the first 14 hours of June 1 under Colonel John O'Neill. Sabotaged by Fenians in its crew, the U.S. Navy's side-wheel gunboat USS Michigan did not begin intercepting Fenian reinforcements until 2:15 p.m.—14 hours after Owen Starr's advance party had crossed the river ahead of O'Neill's main force. Once the USS Michigan was deployed, O'Neill's force in the Niagara Region was cut off from further supplies and reinforcements.

After assembling with other units from Canada and travelling all night, Canadian troops advanced into a well-laid ambush by approximately 600–700 Fenians the next morning north of Ridgeway, a small hamlet west of Fort Erie. (The Fenian strength at Ridgeway had been reduced by desertions and deployments of Fenians in other locations in the area overnight.)

Canadian Militia troops at the Battle of Ridgeway consisted of inexperienced volunteers with no more than basic drill training but armed with Enfield rifled muskets equal to the armaments of the Fenians. A single company of the Queen's Own Rifles of Toronto had been armed the day before on their ferry crossing from Toronto with state-of-the-art seven-shot Spencer repeating rifles, but had not had an opportunity to practise with them and were issued with only 28 rounds per man. The Fenians were mostly battle-hardened American Civil War veterans, armed with weapons procured from leftover war supplies, either Enfield rifled muskets or the comparable Springfield.

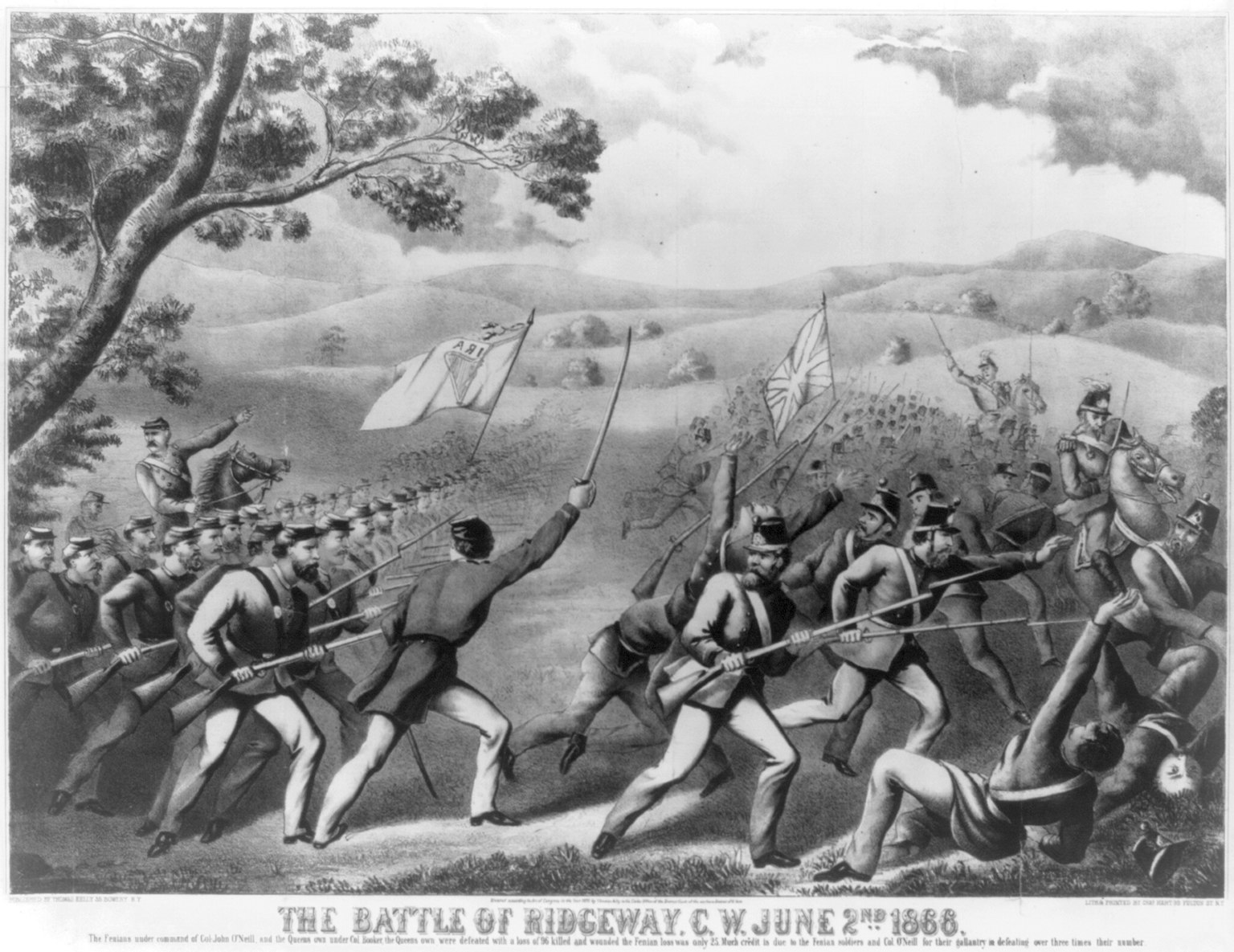
Members of the Canadian Militia were ambushed by the Fenians at the Battle of Ridgeway in June 1866

The opposing forces exchanged volleys for about two hours, before a series of command errors threw the Canadians into confusion. The Fenians took advantage of it by launching a bayonet charge that broke the inexperienced Canadian ranks. Seven Canadians were killed on the battlefield, two died shortly afterwards from wounds, and four later died of wounds or disease while on service; ninety-four more were wounded or disabled by disease. Ten Fenians were killed and sixteen wounded.

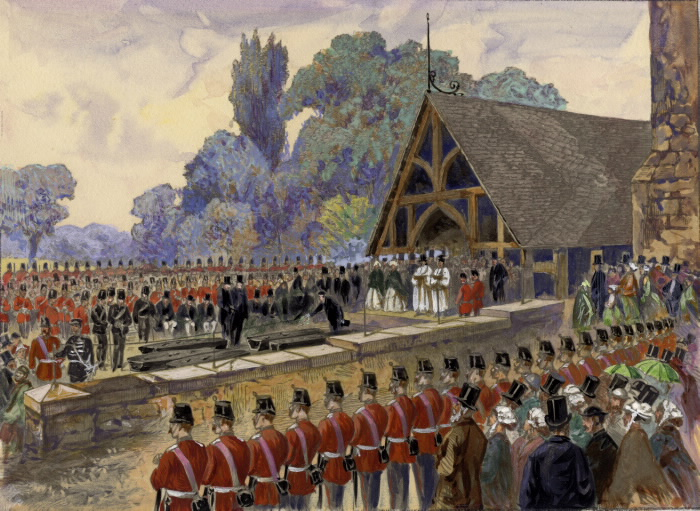
A funeral for soldiers killed during the Fenian attacks in Canada East, 30 June 1866.

After the battle, the Canadians retreated to Port Colborne, at the Lake Erie end of the Welland Canal. The Fenians rested briefly at Ridgeway, before returning to Fort Erie. Another encounter, the Battle of Fort Erie, followed that saw several Canadians severely wounded and the surrender of a large group of local Canadian Militia who had moved into the Fenian rear. After considering the inability of reinforcements to cross the river and the approach of large numbers of Canadian Militia and British soldiers, the remaining Fenians released the Canadian prisoners and returned to Buffalo early in the morning of June 3. They were intercepted by the gunboat Michigan and surrendered to the United States Navy.

The traditional historical narrative alleges that the turning point in the Battle of Ridgeway was when Fenian cavalry was erroneously reported and the Canadian Militia ordered to form squares, the standard tactic for infantry to repel cavalry. When the mistake was recognized, an attempt was made to reform in column; being too close to the Fenian lines, it failed. In his 2011 history of Ridgeway, however, historian Peter Vronsky argues the explanation was not as simple as that. Prior to the formation of the square, confusion had already broken out when a unit of the Queen's Own Rifles mistook three arriving companies from the 13th Battalion (Canadian Militia) for British troops. When the Queen's Own Rifles began retiring to give the field to what they thought were British Army units, the 13th Battalion mistook this for a retreat and began withdrawing themselves. At this moment that the infamous "form square" order was given, completing the debacle that was unfolding on the field.

A board of inquiry determined that allegations over the alleged misconduct of Lieutenant-Colonel Alfred Booker (13th Battalion), on whom command of Canadian volunteers had devolved, had "not the slightest foundation for the unfavourable imputations cast upon him in the public prints". Nevertheless, the charges dogged Booker for the rest of his life. A second board of inquiry into the battle at Fort Erie exonerated Lieutenant-Colonel J. Stoughton Dennis, Brigade Major of the Fifth Military District, although the President of the Board of Inquiry, Colonel George T. Denison, differed from his colleagues on several key points.

Five days after the start of the invasion, U. S. President Andrew Johnson issued a proclamation requiring enforcement of the neutrality laws, guaranteeing the Fenian invasion could not continue. Generals Ulysses S. Grant and George Meade went to Buffalo, New York to inspect the situation. Following instructions from Grant, Meade issued strict orders to prevent anyone from violating the border. Grant then proceeded to St. Louis. Meade, finding that the battles were over and the Fenian army interned in Buffalo, went to Ogdensburg, New York, to oversee the situation in the St. Lawrence River area. The U.S. Army was then instructed to seize all Fenian weapons and ammunition and prevent more border crossings. Further instructions on 7 June 1866 were to arrest anyone who appeared to be a Fenian.

Fenian commander Brigadier-General Thomas William Sweeny was arrested by the United States government for violating American neutrality. He was soon released and served in the United States Army until he retired in 1870.

==== Canada East ====
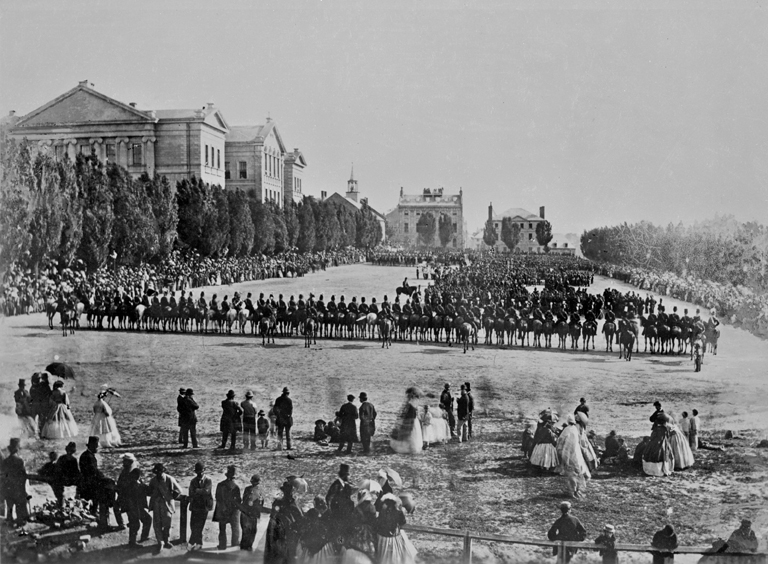
Crowds celebrate the return of militiamen in Montreal, 1866.

After the invasion of Canada West failed, the Fenians concentrated their efforts on Canada East. However, the U.S. government began to impede Fenian activities and arrested many Fenian leaders. The Fenians' plans began to fade. General Samuel P. Spear of the Fenians escaped arrest, and, on June 7, 1866 Spear and his 1,000 to 1,500 men marched into Canada under the Green Irish flag, and occupied Pigeon Hill (called the Pigeon Hill Raid), Frelighsburg, St. Armand and Stanbridge. Until this point the Canadian government had done little to defend the border, but on June 8 Canadian forces marched to Pigeon Hill and the Fenian force there, low on arms, ammunition and supplies, promptly surrendered. (Note: Of the original 1,000 to 1,500, only 200 stragglers crossed back into the United States) This ended the raid on Canada East.

Timothy O'Hea was awarded the Victoria Cross for actions he took at Danville, Canada East, on June 9, 1866, at about the time of the Pigeon Hill Raid. Although only about 23 years old, O'Hea, a private in the 1st Battalion of the Rifle Brigade, Prince Consort's Own, of the British Regular Army, stationed in Canada, saw the threat posed by a burning railway car containing a large quantity of ammunition and fought the blaze single-handedly for an hour, saving the lives of many nearby.

=== Later raids (1870–71) ===
From 1870 to 1871, the Fenian Brotherhood conducted several raids into the Canadian provinces of Quebec and Manitoba.

In addition to organizing raids against those provinces, the Fenian Brotherhood also organized openly in the Northwestern United States in the 1870s, threatening the security of the Colony of British Columbia. (Note: The Colony of British Columbia did not join Canadian Confederation until 20 July 1871, several months before the last Fenian raid took place.) Although the Fenians never launched a raid against British Columbia, tensions were sufficient that the Royal Navy sent several large warships to the new railhead at Vancouver, British Columbia, during celebrations for the completion of the Canadian Pacific Railway in 1886.

==== Quebec ====
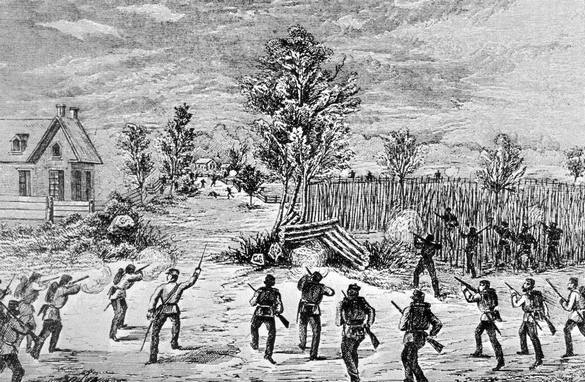
In 1870, a Fenian raid at Eccles Hill was repulsed by the Canadian Militia.

Fenians conducted a raid into Canada on 25 May 1870. Canadian soldiers, acting on information supplied by Thomas Miller Beach, anticipated and turned back the attack at Eccles Hill.

In the Battle of Trout River, Canadians repulsed a Fenian raid on 27 May 1870 outside of Huntingdon, Quebec, near the international border about 20 kilometres (12 mi) north of Malone, New York. (The location of this battle should not be confused with Trout River in the Northwest Territories.)

==== Manitoba–Minnesota border ====
John O'Neill, after the failed 1870 invasion, had resigned the Senate Wing and then joined the Savage Wing. In return he was given a seat on the Savage Wing governing council. In 1871 O'Neill and an odd character named W. B. O'Donoghue asked the Savage Wing Council to undertake another invasion of Canada across the Dakota Territory border. The council, weary of Canadian adventures in general and O'Neill in particular, would have none of it. O'Neill's idea was turned down, but the council promised to loan him arms and agreed they would not publicly denounce him and his raid.

O'Neill resigned from the Fenians to lead the invasion, which was planned in Saint Paul, Minnesota, to invade Manitoba near Winnipeg. About 35 men, led by O'Neill, William B. O'Donoghue, and John J. Donnelly, hoped to join forces with Louis Riel's Métis. On October 5, O'Neill's force managed to capture a Hudson's Bay Company post and a Canadian customs house which they believed to be just north of the international border. A U.S. survey team had determined the border was 3 km (2 mi) further north, placing the Hudson's Bay post and the customs house both inside U.S. territory. O'Neill, J. J. Donnelly and ten others were taken prisoner near Pembina, Dakota Territory, by U.S. soldiers led Captain Loyd Wheaton.

The farcical raid was doomed from the very start. It actually took place inside the United States, and the Métis under Riel had signed a pact with the British just as the invasion began. Riel and his Métis captured O'Donoghue and gave him to U.S. authorities. In a somewhat muddled federal response, O'Neill was arrested twice – once in Dakota and once in Minnesota – but was released and never charged for "invading" U.S. territory. The men captured with him were released by the court as simply "dupes" of O'Neill and Donnelly.

== Aftermath ==
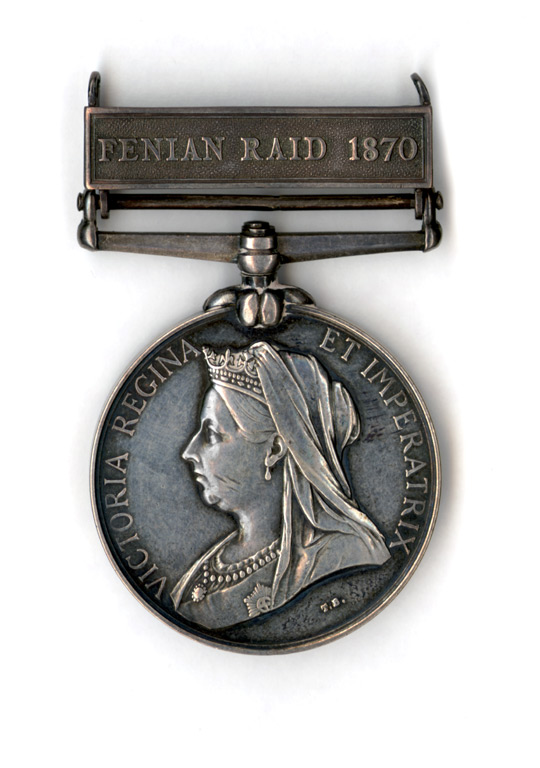
Canada General Service Medal issued for service in the Canadian Militia related to the Fenian incursions in 1870

Support for the Fenian Brotherhood's invasion of Canada quickly disappeared and there was no real threat after the 1890s. Nevertheless, the raids had an important effect on all Canadians. Ironically, though they did nothing to advance the cause of Irish independence, the 1866 Fenian raids and the inept efforts of the Canadian Militia to repulse them helped to galvanize support for Confederation in 1867. Some historians have argued that the affair tipped the final votes of reluctant Maritime provinces in favour of the collective security of nationhood, making Ridgeway the "battle that made Canada." Alexander Muir, a Scottish immigrant, author of "The Maple Leaf Forever" and member of the Orange Order, fought at Ridgeway with the Queen's Own Rifles.

The raids also aroused a martial spirit among Canadians by testing the militia's strength. Because of their poor performance, the militia took efforts to improve themselves. This was achieved without the huge cost of a real war. The militia possessed an authorized strength of 40,000 men, however, during the period of the 1866 raids, a total of 37,170 volunteers turned out. The greatest impact of the Fenian raids was in the developing a sense of Canadian nationalism and leading the provinces into Confederation. This was seen as necessary for survival and self-defence; the raids showed Canadians that safety lay in unity and were an important factor in creating the modern nation-state of Canada.

The Fenian raids caused increased anti-American sentiment in Canada and the Maritimes because of the U.S. government's perceived tolerance of the Fenians when they were meeting openly and preparing for the raids. However, many Americans saw this as retribution against British-Canadian tolerance and aid to the Confederate Secret Service activities in Canada against the Union during the Civil War (such as the Chesapeake Affair and the St. Albans Raid). An estimated casualty figure for the Fenian Raids into Canada 1866, including deaths from disease while on service in both Canada West (Ontario) and Canada East (Quebec), was calculated by the Militia Department in 1868 as 31 dead and 103 wounded or struck by disease (including a female civilian accidentally shot by the militia.)

=== Flags ===
During the raids, the Fenians mostly flew green flags with a golden harp, although there were many variations of the green flag used by them like the sunburst flag. Captain O'Brien flew a unique white flag that was originally made in 1842 for an Irish militia in Philadelphia, Pennsylvania, United States. On Saint Patrick's Day 1866, the Fenian Brotherhood officially adopted a flag for their organization. It was similar to the US flag, but the canton was green with a white harp instead of a stars. These flags were a symbol of Fenian Brotherhood's aspirations for an independent Ireland.

Many of the Fenian chapters also had their own unique flags bearing Irish symbols. These flags were quite costly, and in September 1867, a resolution was adopted that only military companies could carry flags. Any left-over money was to be spent on firearms or sent back to the Fenian headquarters. These flags were very popular in Irish community, and in May 1866, a flag manufacture in Albany, New York, got an order to make 50,000 Fenian flags. The flags were even flown on British soil but they were quickly taken down by authorities. British flags were also harassed at this time: in one incident in 1867 a group of Fenians were at the Port of Cleveland when they saw the Union Jack flying from the ship Elk. The group demanded the captain take it down, but he refused, so they stormed onto the boat and pulled it down.

The Canadian Militia primarily flew the Red Ensign, a common symbol for Canadian military units. They also carried the Union Jack.

During the early raids in 1866, the Fenians captured three British flags. One was described as being large and was captured at the Battle of Ridgeway. In 1897 the flag was displayed at an Irish fair in Chicago. Another, a large Red Ensign, was captured at Frelighsburg. When the Fenians brought it back to their headquarters they flew it upside down and with their green flag above it as a sign of disrespect.

==== Fenian flags ====
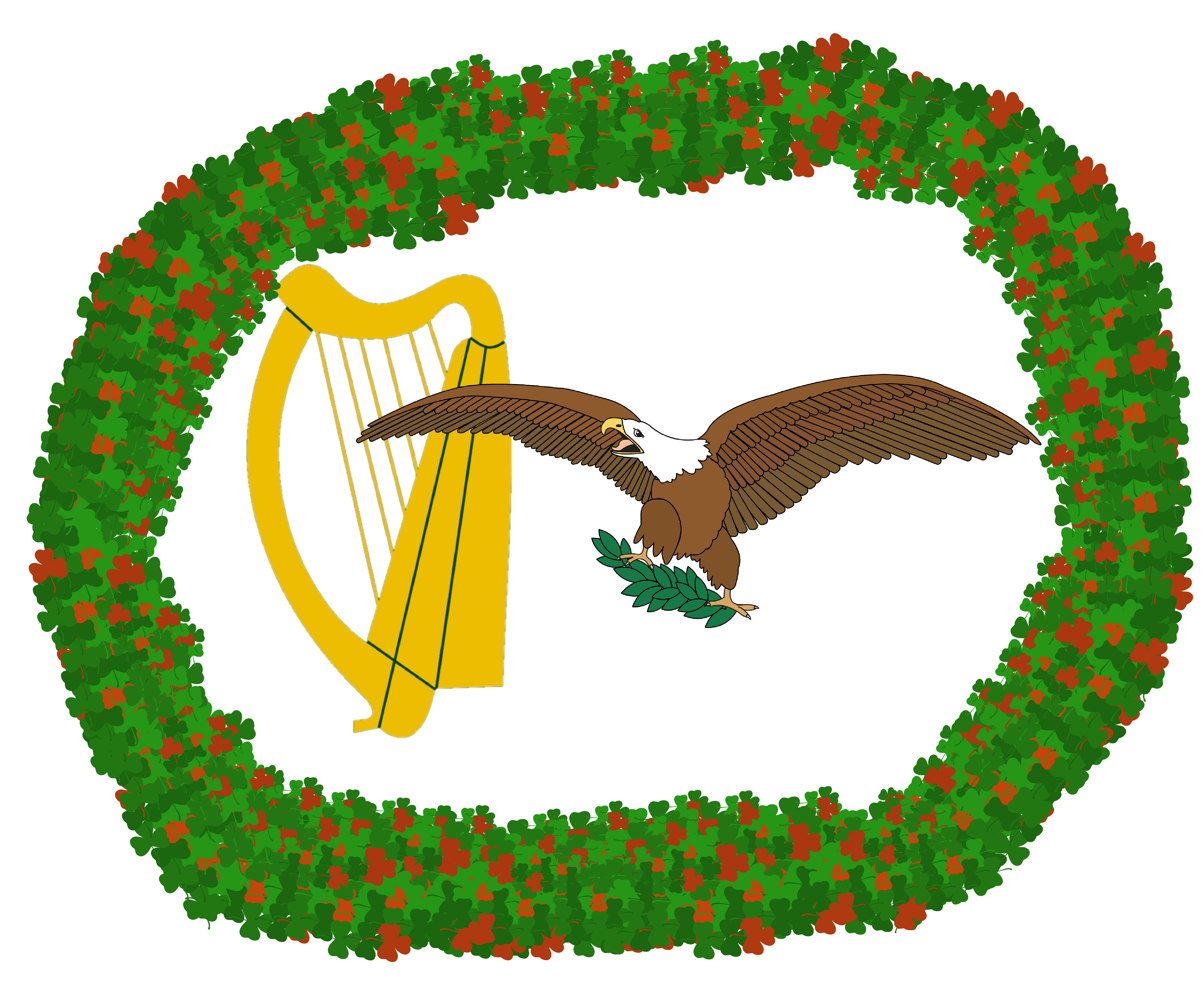
Reconstruction of Captain O'Brien's flag (obverse)

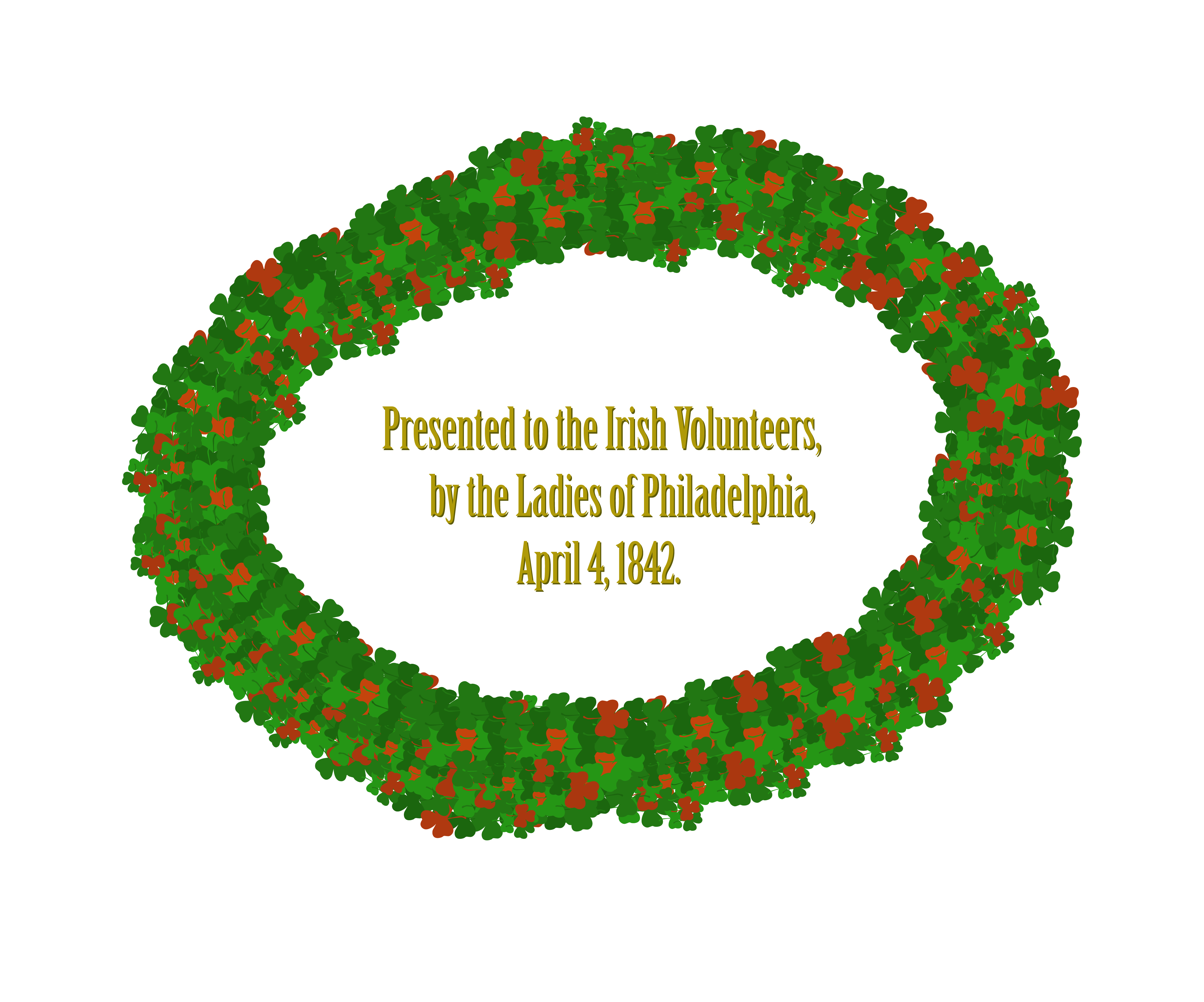
(reverse)

Reconstruction of Buffalo's 7th Infantry Regiment flag. It was use at the battles of Ridgeway and Fort Erie

Reconstruction of the Fenian Battalion flag, 1866

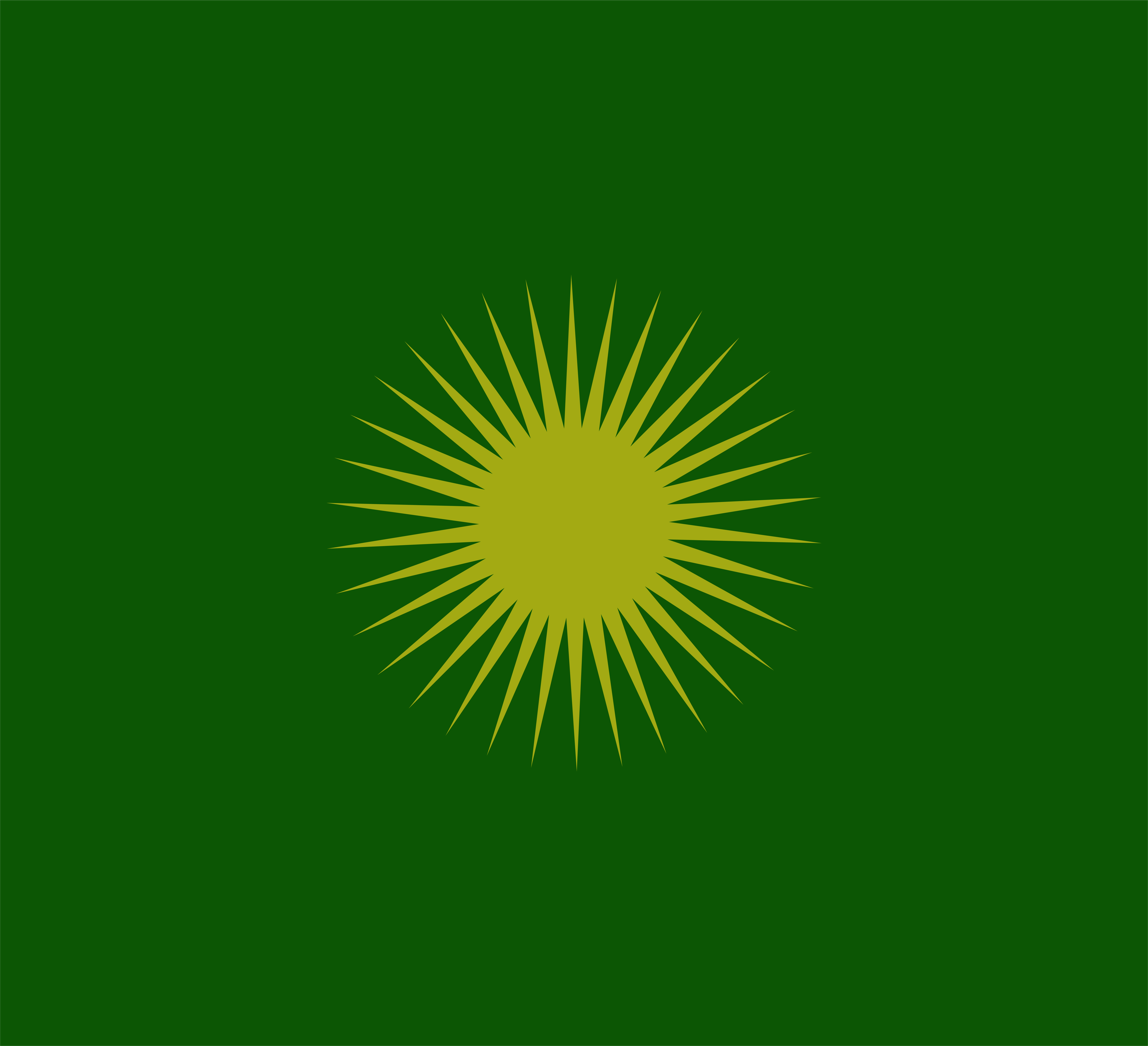
Reconstruction of the Fenian flag displayed in Washington D.C. on December 4, 1866, (obverse)

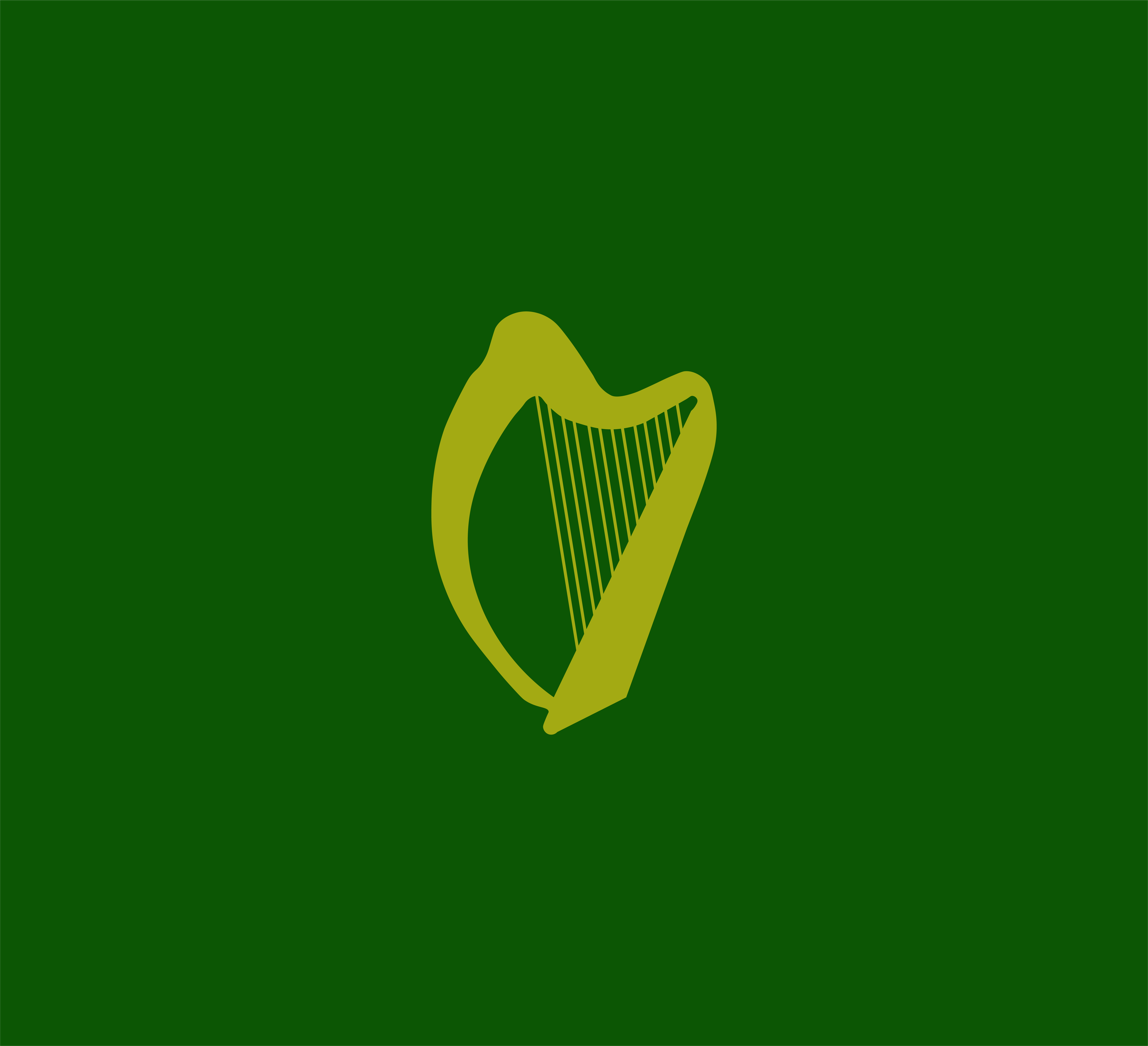
(reverse)

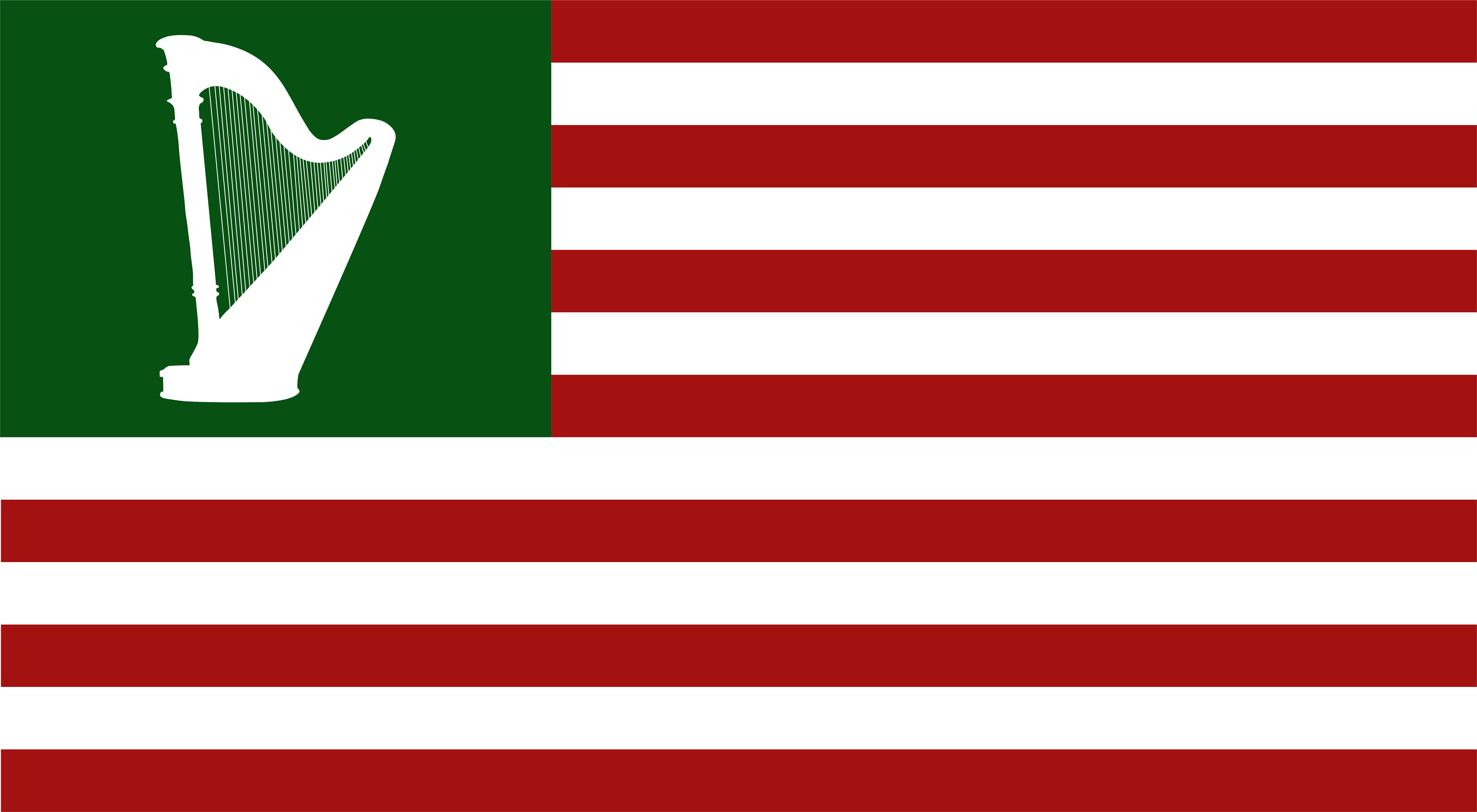
Reconstruction of the flag adopted by Fenian Brotherhood on March 17, 1866

==== Canadian flags ====
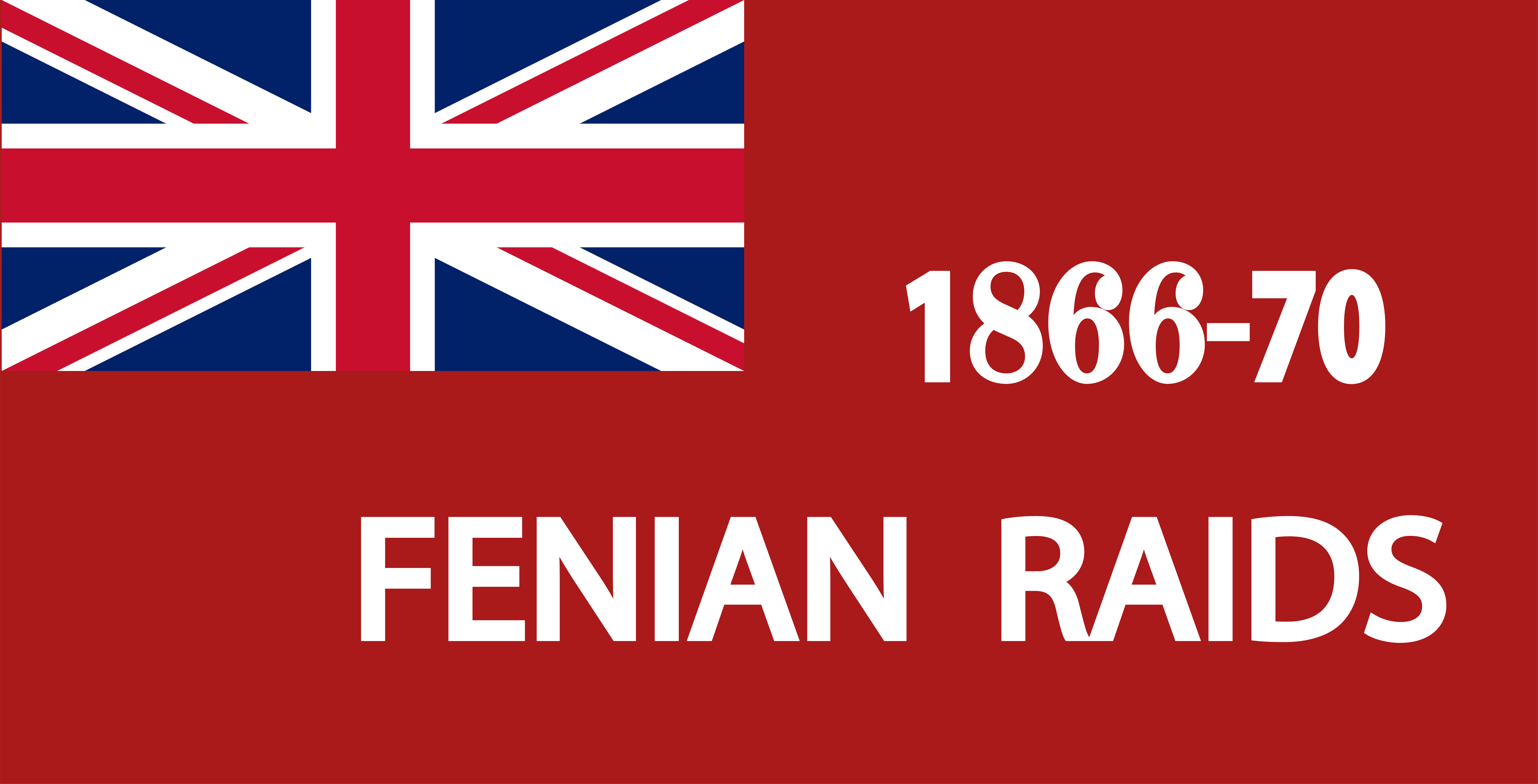
Canadian militia flag c.1870

Flag carried by the 40th Northumberland Regiment, 1866

=== Memory ===
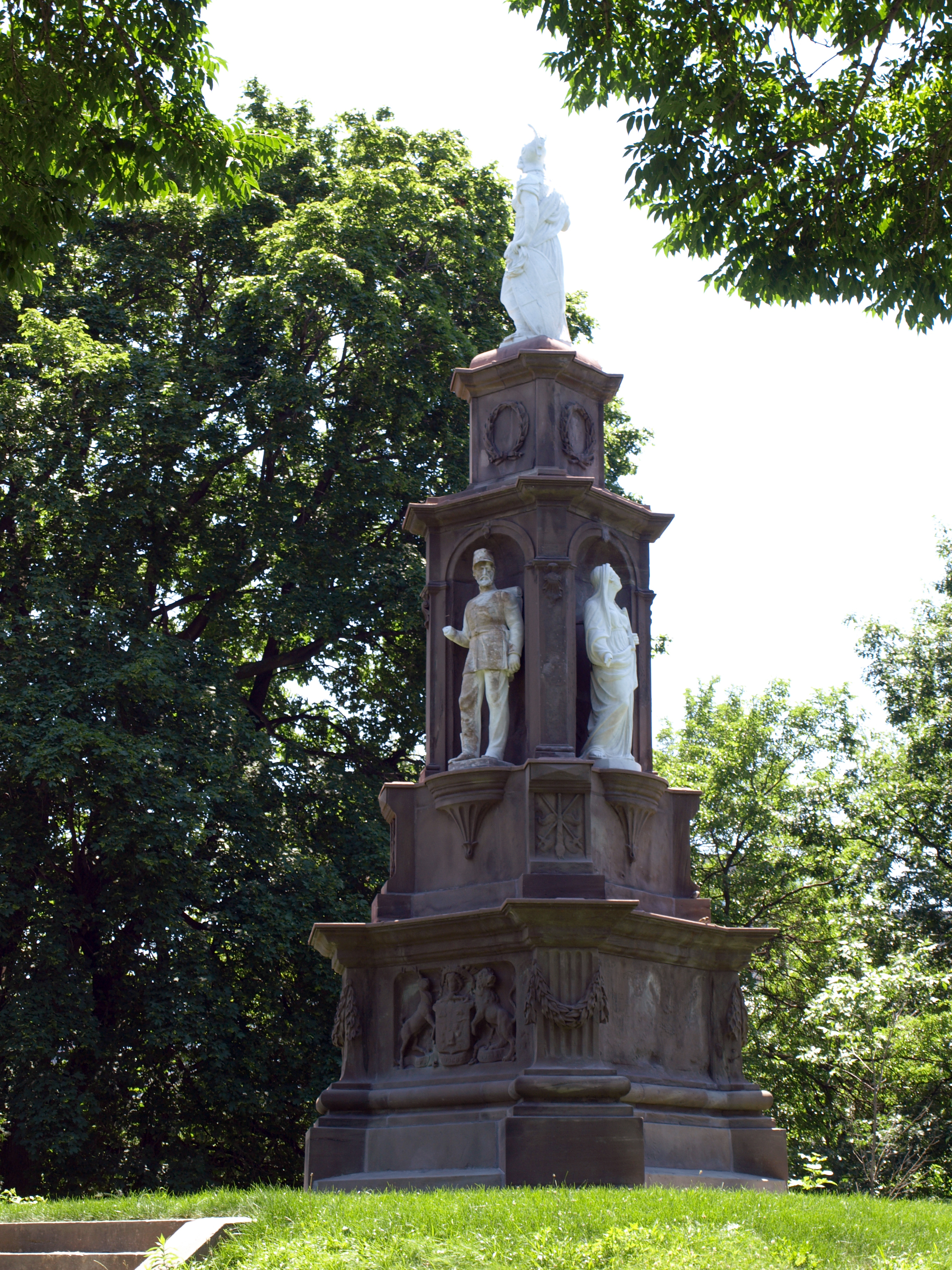
A monument at Queen's Park to commemorate Canadian militiamen who died during the Battle of Ridgeway

Several memorials were erected throughout Canada, commemorating those who volunteered with the Canadian Militia fought during the raids. These monuments include the Canadian Volunteers Monument in Queen's Park, Toronto, and the Battle of Eccles Hill Monument in Frelighsburg, Quebec. In June 2006 Ontario's heritage agency dedicated a plaque at Ridgeway on the commemoration of the 140th anniversary of the battle. Many members of the Queen's Own Rifles of Canada return to the Ridgeway battle site on the weekend closest to the June 2 anniversary for a bicycle tour of the battle sites.

In Buffalo, a historic marker commemorates the June 1866 Fenian incursion into Fort Erie and Ridgeway, Ont. The marker is located in the Black Rock neighborhood in Tow Path Park on the west end of Hertel overlooking the Niagara River.

== See also ==
- Fenian dynamite campaign
- Fenian Rising
- List of Fenian raids weapons
- Canada General Service Medal
- List of Irish uprisings
- List of wars involving Canada
