= 17th United States Colored Infantry Regiment =

17th United States Colored Infantry
- Active: December 12, 1863 - April 25, 1866
- Country: United States
- Allegiance: Union
- Branch: Infantry
- Engagements: Battle of Nashville

The 17th United States Colored Infantry was an infantry regiment that served in the Union Army during the American Civil War. The regiment was composed of African American enlisted men commanded by white officers and was authorized by the Bureau of Colored Troops which was created by the United States War Department on May 22, 1863.

== Service ==
The 17th U.S. Colored Infantry was organized in Nashville, Tennessee beginning December 12, 1863 and mustered in for three-year service under the command of Colonel William Rufus Shafter. (Note: Shafter (October 16, 1835 – November 12, 1906) had received the Medal of Honor, for his actions at the Battle of Fair Oaks. Shafter also played a prominent part as a major general in the Spanish–American War. Fort Shafter, Hawaii, is named for him, as well as the city of Shafter, California and the ghost town of Shafter, Texas. He was nicknamed "Pecos Bill", inspiration for the fictional character of the same name in tall tales.)

The regiment was attached to Post of Murfreesboro, Tennessee, Department of the Cumberland, to April 1864. Post and District of Nashville, Tennessee, Department of the Cumberland, to December 1864. 1st Colored Brigade, District of the Etowah, Department of the Cumberland, to January 1865. Post and District of Nashville, Tennessee, Department of the Cumberland, to April 1866.

The 17th U.S. Colored Infantry mustered out of service April 30, 1866.

== Detailed service ==
Duty at McMinnville and Murfreesboro, Tenn., until November 1864. Battle of Nashville, Tenn., December 15–16. Overton Hill December 16. Pursuit of Hood to the Tennessee River December 17–27. Decatur December 28–30. Duty at Post of Nashville, Tenn., until April 1866.

== Commanders ==
- Colonel William Rufus Shafter

== See also ==
- List of United States Colored Troops Civil War Units
- United States Colored Troops
