= Battle of Fort Erie (1866) =

Skirmish during the Fenian Raids

Coordinates: 42.89667°N 78.92515°W

- Part of Fenian Raids
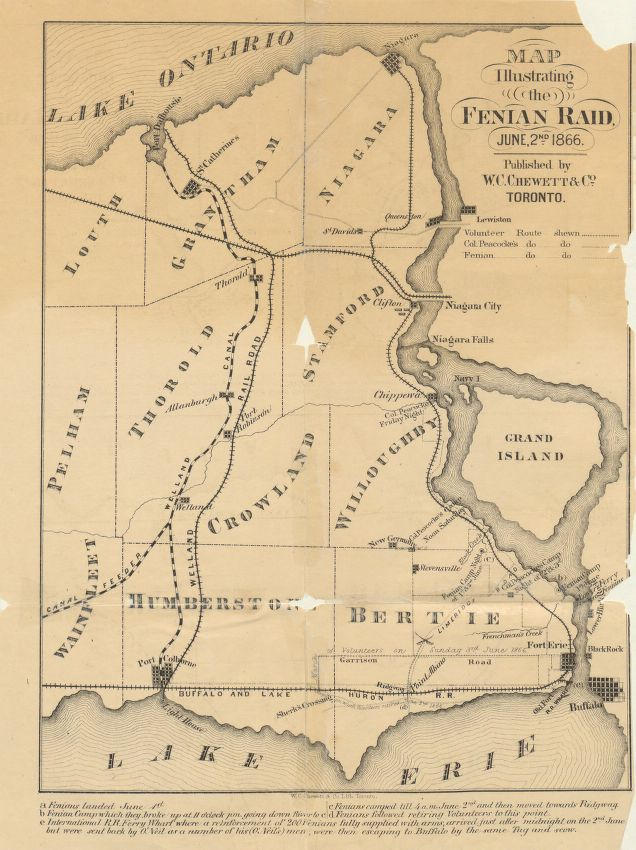
- A Canadian map of the raid
Date	June 2, 1866
Location	Fort Erie, Canada West
Result	Initial Fenian Victory followed by a retreat: End of Fenian incursions along the Niagara Peninsula
Territorial changes	Fenians retreat back to New York State; Canadian forces retake Fort Erie

Belligerents
Fenian Brotherhood	(United Kingdom) Province of Canada

Commanders and leaders
John O'Neill	John Stoughton Dennis

Strength
400 (estimate)	79 (5,000 later)

Casualties and losses
9 dead, 14 wounded 57 captured Several deserted	6 wounded, 40 captured

During the 1866 Fenian raids into the Province of Canada, the Battle of Fort Erie was a surrounding and forcing of the Fenian invaders' surrender following a skirmish near Fort Erie and the further-away Battle of Ridgeway on June 2. The Fenian force, withdrawing from Ridgeway, met a small force of Canadian militia at Fort Erie, then known as the village of Waterloo.

== Battle ==
In response to the Fenian occupation of the township of Fort Erie, Canada West, on the night of June 1, 1866, militia units throughout the Niagara Peninsula had been mobilized or put on alert. At Port Colborne, a detachment of 51 gunners and NCOs, British Royal Artillery Bombardier Sergeant James McCracken and three officers (Captain Richard S. King, Lieutenants A.K. Schofield and Charles Nimmo [Nemmo]) taken under command by Lieutenant-Colonel John Dennis, boarded a tugboat, the W.T. Robb, carrying the Dunnville Naval Brigade, consisting of 19 men and three officers (Captain Lachlan McCallum, Lieutenant Walter T. Robb, Second Lieutenant Angus Macdonald) (a total of 71 men and eight officers) and steamed east to the Niagara River, then scouted downriver as far as Black Creek. The Welland Field Battery did not have its four Armstrong guns, and only half were armed with Enfield muzzle-loading rifles. The other half was armed with obsolete smooth-bore "Victoria" carbines that had a limited range of approximately 300 yards at best.

Thinking the Fenians were gone, Canadian volunteers turned back upriver to secure the village of Fort Erie and deny them an escape route. A company of the Welland Field Battery landed without difficulty, capturing around 59 of the Fenian soldiers. However, when John O'Neill returned with most of his large army from the nearby Battle of Ridgeway, the small number of Canadian volunteers that were sent to capture the Fenian soldiers were not prepared. A firefight followed, in which the militia and sailors were outnumbered by Fenian soldiers causing most of the Canadian volunteers to surrender. The remaining Canadian volunteers on the gunboat went back to Port Colborne to inform of the situation while O'Neill and the Fenian soldiers stayed in Fort Erie. Later, around 5,000 Canadian militia reinforcements informed of the situation came and surrounded the Fenian movement’s army in Fort Erie, causing O'Neill to retreat back to New York State. Some Fenians chose to desert, crossing the river on a variety of stolen or improvised craft. The remainder, 850 in number, crossed in a body and surrendered to a US naval party from USS Michigan near Buffalo, putting an end to Fenian incursions along the Niagara Peninsula.

== See also ==
- Fenian Rising
