= John Stoughton Dennis =

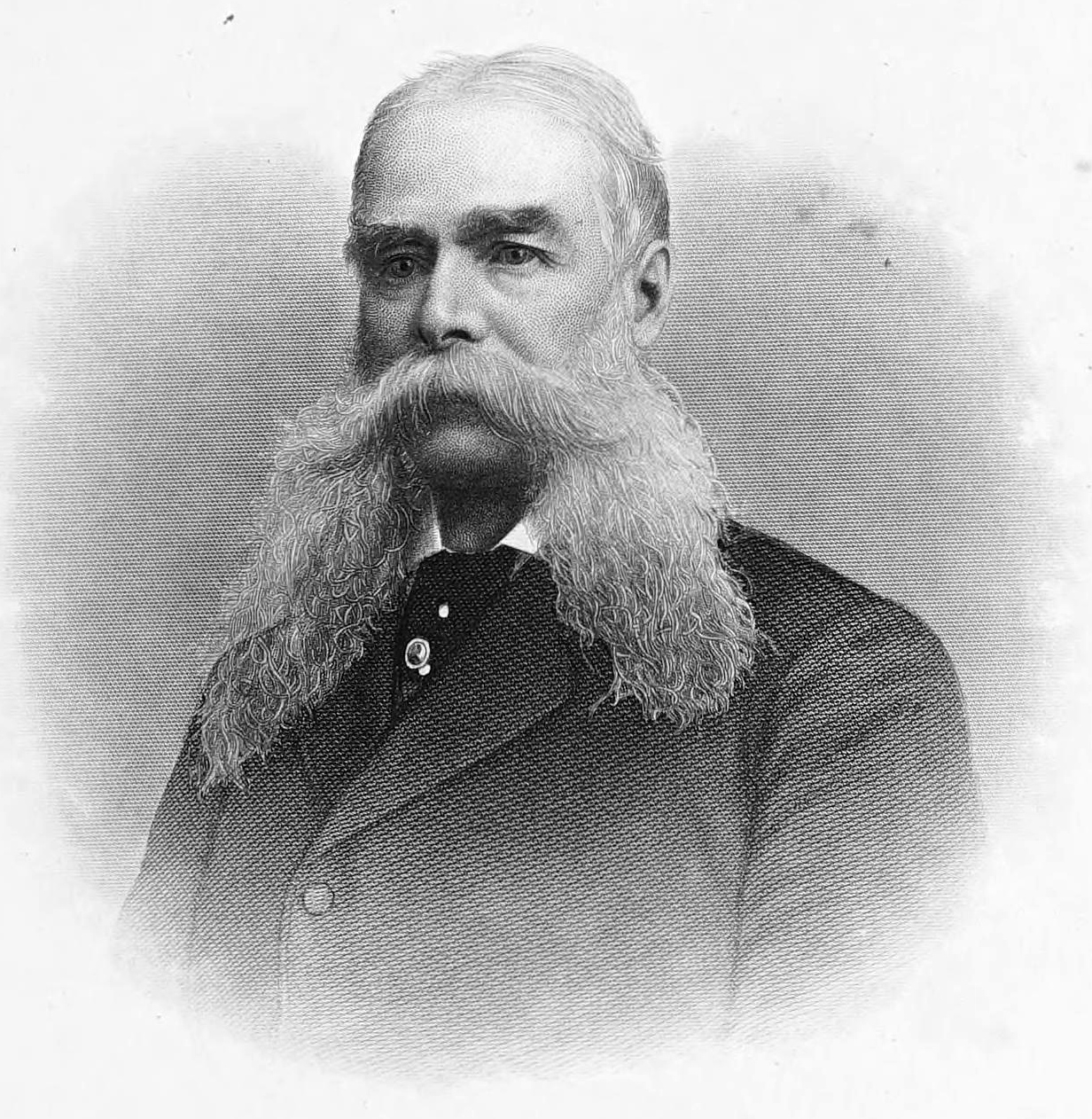
Dennis in an 1880 engraving

Lieutenant-Colonel John Stoughton Dennis CMG (19 October 1820 – 7 July 1885) was a Canadian surveyor, militia officer, and civil servant, born in Kingston, Upper Canada.

In 1866, Dennis led an ill-fated militia attack against the Fenians at Fort Erie. Dennis is noted for his role in precipitating the Red River Rebellion by his 1869 surveys of the Red River Colony. He was the father of Colonel John Stoughton Dennis Jr., who also became a noted surveyor and militia officer.

In the 1882 Birthday Honours, he was created a Companion of the Order of St Michael and St George.

In 1916 Mount Dennis in the Canadian Rockies was named for him.
