= Ridgeway, Ontario =

Ridgeway
- Unincorporated Community
- Interactive map of Ridgeway
- Coordinates: 42°53′1.0104″N 79°03′26.751″W
- Country: Canada
- Province: Ontario
- Regional Municipality: Niagara

Government
  - Mayor (Fort Erie): Wayne Redekop
  - MP: Rob Nicholson (CPC)
  - MPP: Wayne Gates (NDP)

Area
  - Land: 166.24 km^{2} (64.19 sq mi)

Population (2011)
  - Total: 29,960 (Fort Erie)
  - Density: 180.2/km^{2} (467/sq mi)
- Time zone: UTC-5 (EST)
  - Summer (DST): UTC-4 (EDT)
- Postal code span: L0S 1N0
- Area codes: 905, 289, 365

Ridgeway is a small, unincorporated village in Fort Erie, Ontario, Canada. The community is within the Niagara Regional Municipality. It used to be the seat of government for Bertie Township within Welland County. Ridgeway is now a part of the Town of Fort Erie. In recent years the rail line has been converted to a walking and cycling trail, part of a trail system circling the Niagara region.

== History ==
Ridgeway takes its name from the limestone ridge which runs through it from north to south. The main street of town aptly named Ridge Road, follows this ridge, and was part of one of the first two wagon trails in Bertie Township, connecting Point Abino on Lake Erie to Miller’s Creek on the Niagara River.

Ridgeway was settled by the United Empire loyalists in the late 18th-century, and was originally a farming community. In the 1850s the Buffalo, Brantford and Goderich Railway line was put through, and service industries began to develop around the train stop on Ridge Road. The business district spread north from there towards Dominion Road. In 1873 the post office was opened, having been moved from Point Abino.

=== Battle of Ridgeway ===
It is notable for being the location of the 1866 Battle of Ridgeway, resulting from a raid by the Irish-American Fenian Brotherhood near the intersection of Ridge and Garrison Roads on June 2, 1866. Irish-American revolutionaries known as Fenians invaded Canada as part of an attempt to oust the British and create an independent Irish republic. This was the largest of these border skirmishes. Canadian militiamen under the command of Lieutenant Colonel Alfred Booker arrived by train and marched to battle the invaders. The Fenians retired to Fort Erie and returned to Buffalo the same night. The Battle of Ridgeway shocked the country, spurring improvements to Canada’s defenses, and helping to bolster the movement for confederation, which took place the next year.

== Events ==
Ridgeway is home to the Ridgeway Shores Golf Club (now closed) and Cherry Hill Club which once hosted the Canadian Open golf tournament in 1972.

=== Ridgeway Summer Festival ===
Within the Town of Fort Erie, the Village of Ridgeway offers Victorian charm to visitors and residents. The Ridgeway Summer Festival is held every year on the second weekend in July. The streets are closed off, and thousands of visitors stroll the historical downtown enjoying music, food, vendors, and shows. An event called Spirit of Christmas is held on the first weekend in December, Friday evening and Saturday only, featuring horse-drawn carriage rides, school choirs singing outdoors, Victorian carollers, strolling Santa, food and more.

== Geography ==
Fort Erie area is generally flat, but there are low sand hills, varying in height from 2 to 15 metres, along the shore of Lake Erie, and a limestone ridge extends from Crystal Beach to near Miller's Creek, giving Ridgeway its name. The soil is shallow, with a clay subsoil.

Situated just north of Crystal Beach and Bay Beach which are considered the best beaches in the area and draw many weekend visitors from the Toronto and Buffalo areas. While summers are enjoyable, winters can occasionally be fierce, with many snowstorms, whiteouts and winds whipping off Lake Erie.

== Communities ==
Ridgeway is one of the neighbourhoods of Fort Erie, along with Black Creek, Bridgeburg/NorthEnd/Victoria, Crescent Park, Crystal Beach, Point Abino, Snyder, and Stevensville.

Fort Erie Secondary School and Ridgeway-Crystal Beach High School are the two public high schools serving Fort Erie and area communities. The 2 schools closed in June 2017 due to low populations and have combined into Greater Fort Erie Secondary School serving all areas of Fort Erie.

== Climate ==
Climate data for Fort Erie (1981−2010)
Month	Jan	Feb	Mar	Apr	May	Jun	Jul	Aug	Sep	Oct	Nov	Dec	Year
Record high °C (°F)	15.0 (59.0)	16.5 (61.7)	25.0 (77.0)	32.0 (89.6)	31.0 (87.8)	34.0 (93.2)	34.5 (94.1)	35.5 (95.9)	31.7 (89.1)	29.0 (84.2)	22.5 (72.5)	18.0 (64.4)	35.5 (95.9)
Mean daily maximum °C (°F)	−0.2 (31.6)	1.0 (33.8)	5.1 (41.2)	11.8 (53.2)	18.3 (64.9)	23.3 (73.9)	26.1 (79.0)	25.5 (77.9)	21.6 (70.9)	15.0 (59.0)	8.7 (47.7)	2.8 (37.0)	13.2 (55.8)
Daily mean °C (°F)	−4.1 (24.6)	−3.3 (26.1)	0.4 (32.7)	6.6 (43.9)	12.7 (54.9)	18.1 (64.6)	21.2 (70.2)	20.6 (69.1)	16.7 (62.1)	10.4 (50.7)	4.9 (40.8)	−0.8 (30.6)	8.6 (47.5)
Mean daily minimum °C (°F)	−8 (18)	−7.6 (18.3)	−4.3 (24.3)	1.4 (34.5)	7.1 (44.8)	12.8 (55.0)	16.1 (61.0)	15.5 (59.9)	11.7 (53.1)	5.8 (42.4)	1.1 (34.0)	−4.3 (24.3)	4.0 (39.2)
Record low °C (°F)	−28.5 (−19.3)	−31 (−24)	−25.5 (−13.9)	−12 (10)	−4.5 (23.9)	1.0 (33.8)	5.5 (41.9)	1.5 (34.7)	−1 (30)	−6.1 (21.0)	−15.5 (4.1)	−24.5 (−12.1)	−31 (−24)
Average precipitation mm (inches)	78.9 (3.11)	66.6 (2.62)	71.0 (2.80)	78.8 (3.10)	93.2 (3.67)	81.7 (3.22)	84.7 (3.33)	88.5 (3.48)	105.4 (4.15)	96.7 (3.81)	102.8 (4.05)	103.2 (4.06)	1,051.3 (41.39)
Average rainfall mm (inches)	34.2 (1.35)	32.8 (1.29)	44.7 (1.76)	74.4 (2.93)	92.3 (3.63)	81.7 (3.22)	84.7 (3.33)	88.5 (3.48)	105.4 (4.15)	95.3 (3.75)	89.9 (3.54)	52.5 (2.07)	876.3 (34.50)
Average snowfall cm (inches)	44.7 (17.6)	33.8 (13.3)	26.3 (10.4)	4.4 (1.7)	0.85 (0.33)	0.0 (0.0)	0.0 (0.0)	0.0 (0.0)	0.0 (0.0)	1.4 (0.6)	12.9 (5.1)	50.7 (20.0)	175.0 (68.9)
Average precipitation days (≥ 0.2 mm)	15.8	12.2	12.2	13.2	13.0	11.4	10.4	10.2	11.4	12.9	14.7	15.2	152.3
Average rainy days (≥ 0.2 mm)	5.9	5.0	7.9	12.3	13.0	11.4	10.4	10.2	11.4	12.9	12.8	7.9	120.9
Average snowy days (≥ 0.2 cm)	10.6	8.0	5.4	1.5	0.08	0.0	0.0	0.0	0.0	0.08	2.9	8.2	36.6
Source: Environment Canada.

== History ==
The Fort Erie area contains deposits of flint, and became important in the production of spearheads, arrowheads, and other tools. In the late sixteenth and early seventeenth centuries, the Niagara Peninsula was inhabited by the Neutral Nation, so named by the French because they tried to remain neutral between the warring Huron and Iroquois peoples. In 1650, during the Beaver Wars, the Iroquois Confederacy declared war on the Neutral Nation, driving them from their traditional territory by 1651, and practically annihilating them by 1653. The Battle of Ridgeway (1866) was fought near here, as part of a Fenian invasion of Canada from the United States. The Grand Trunk Railway built the International Railway Bridge in 1873, bringing about a new town, originally named Victoria and subsequently renamed to Bridgeburg, north of the original settlement of Fort Erie. By 1876, Ridgeway had an estimated population of 800, the village of Fort Erie has an estimated population of 1,200, and Victoria boasted three railway stations. By 1887, Stevensville had an estimated population of "nearly 600", Victoria of "nearly 700", Ridgeway of "about 600", and Fort Erie of "about 4,000". In 1970, the provincial government consolidated the various villages in what had been Bertie Township, including the then town of Fort Erie, into the present Town of Fort Erie.

== Demographics ==
The 2011 Census of Canada indicated a population of 29,960 for Fort Erie. This was a 0.1% increase over the 2006 Census. The median household income in 2005 for Fort Erie was $47,485, which was below the Ontario provincial average of $60,455.

Canada 2006 Census		Population	% of Total Population
Visible minority group Source:	South Asian	225	0.8%
Visible minority group Source:	Chinese	365	1.2%
Visible minority group Source:	Black	300	1%
Visible minority group Source:	Filipino	50	0.2%
Visible minority group Source:	Latin American	410	1.4%
Visible minority group Source:	Arab	40	0.1%
Visible minority group Source:	Southeast Asian	45	0.2%
Visible minority group Source:	West Asian	30	0.1%
Visible minority group Source:	Korean	85	0.3%
Visible minority group Source:	Japanese	20	0.1%
Visible minority group Source:	Other visible minority	35	0.1%
Visible minority group Source:	Mixed visible minority	20	0.1%
Total visible minority population		1,620	5.5%
Aboriginal group Source:	First Nations	750	2.5%
Aboriginal group Source:	Métis	150	0.5%
Aboriginal group Source:	Inuit	0	0%
Total Aboriginal population		940	3.2%
White		26,985	91.3%
Total population		29,545	100%

Census	Population
1871	835
1901	890
1911	1,146
1921	1,546
1931	2,383
1941	6,566
1951	7,572
1961	9,027
1971	23,113
1981	24,096
1991	26,006
2001	28,143
2006	29,925
2011	29,960

According to the 2001 census, the population was 28,143, broken down as follows: 92.8% White, 3.2% Aboriginal, 1.4% Chinese, 0.9% Black, and a very small percentage of Asian, Arab, and Hispanic populations.

== Transportation ==
Ontario Highway 3 runs through Ridgeway and was named King's Highway 3A from 1927 to 1929, Within Ridgeway, Highway 3 is named Garrison Road, and is the major East-West connection through the town. Dominion Road was designated as King's Highway 3C from 1934 until 1970, when it was downloaded to the newly formed Regional Municipality of Niagara and redesignated as Niagara Regional Road 1.

== Trails ==
Fort Erie is the eastern terminus of the Friendship Trail, and the southern terminus of the Niagara River Recreation Pathway. Both trails are part of the Trans-Canada Trail system.

== See also ==
- List of townships in Ontario
