= Battle of Ridgeway =

1866 battle of the Fenian Raids on Canada

- Part of the Fenian Raids
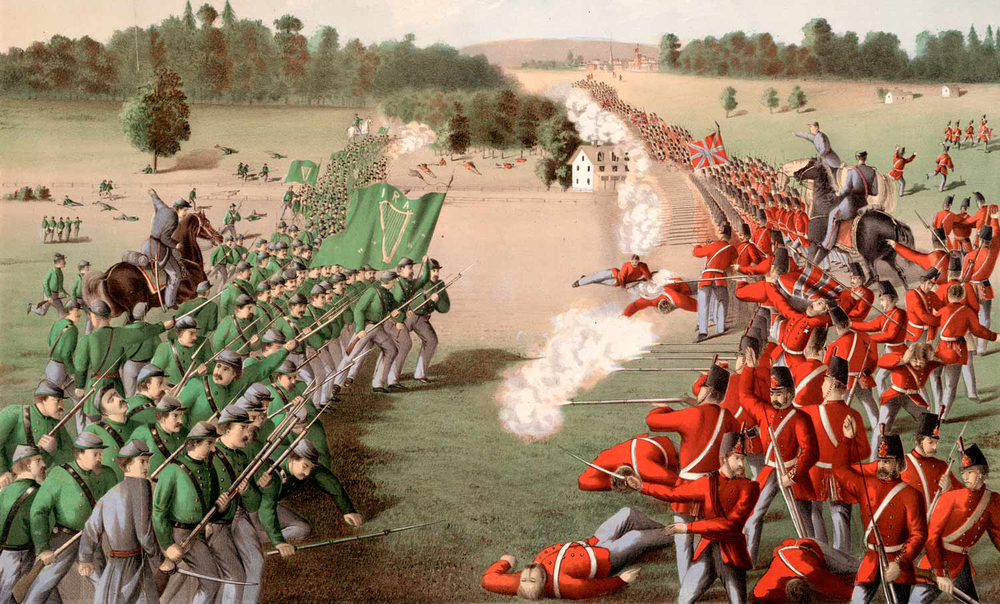
- An 1869 illustration of the battle: Charge of General O'Neill's Fenians upon the Canadian troops, causing their rout.
Date	2 June 1866
Location	Ridgeway, Canada West 42°54′16″N 79°02′30″W
Result	Fenian victory

Belligerents
Fenian Brotherhood	(United Kingdom) Province of Canada

Commanders and leaders
Brig. Gen. John O'Neill	Lt. Col. Alfred Booker

Strength
600–700	850

Casualties and losses
2 killed in action 8 wounded	9 killed in action 37 wounded 22 died of wounds/disease

The Battle of Ridgeway (sometimes the Battle of Lime Ridge or Limestone Ridge (Note: Sometimes the "Battle of Ridgeway" includes the Battle of Fort Erie (1866) fought several hours later as the victorious Fenians returned to Fort Erie, Canada West.)) was fought in the vicinity of the town of Fort Erie across the Niagara River from Buffalo, New York, near the village of Ridgeway, Canada West, currently Ontario, Canada, on June 2, 1866, between Canadian troops and an irregular army of Irish-American invaders, the Fenians. It was the largest engagement of the Fenian Raids, the first modern industrial-era battle to be fought by Canadians and the first to be fought only by Canadian troops and led exclusively by Canadian officers. (Note: Except for a Royal Artillery bombardier detached to the Welland Canal Field Artillery Battery, Sergeant James McCracken and one British private, Dennis Sullivan, captured and paroled by the Fenians the day before, both at Fort Erie, no British military personnel were present at the battle at Limestone Ridge.) The battlefield was designated a National Historic Site of Canada in 1921 and is the last battle fought within the current boundaries of Ontario against a foreign invasion.

== Background ==
The New York City-based Fenian Brotherhood was attempting to support related groups in Ireland to force the United Kingdom into negotiating toward the formation of an independent Irish Republic. They took advantage of the ready supply of arms in the United States after the recently concluded Civil War, and of the ample number of unemployed young men who had emerged from that conflict with some degree of military training. The plan was to take Canada temporarily hostage in the hope of demoralizing British rule in Ireland by precipitating a political crisis in Britain. The Fenians were also mistakenly counting on receiving U.S. recognition for the seizure of Canadian territory. It was still a ragtag army, however, that assembled on the American shore of the Niagara River during the last weeks of May 1866. The Fenians had made little attempt at secrecy, and both American and British authorities were aware of the imminent military operation but could not pin-point the exact crossing points in advance.

=== Units involved ===
The Fenian units involved in the battle were the 7th Buffalo (NY), the 18th Ohio, the 13th Tennessee, and the 17th Kentucky Fenian regiments, as well as independent companies from Indiana and from New Orleans (the Fenian Louisiana Tigers). The Fenians wore an assortment of blue U.S. Army and grey Confederate Army tunics, some with green facings sewn to them, but many of the Fenians took to the field in civilian clothing with green scarves. The Fenians carried battle standards consisting of the Irish 'sunburst' in gold on a green background and one standard featuring the Irish harp.

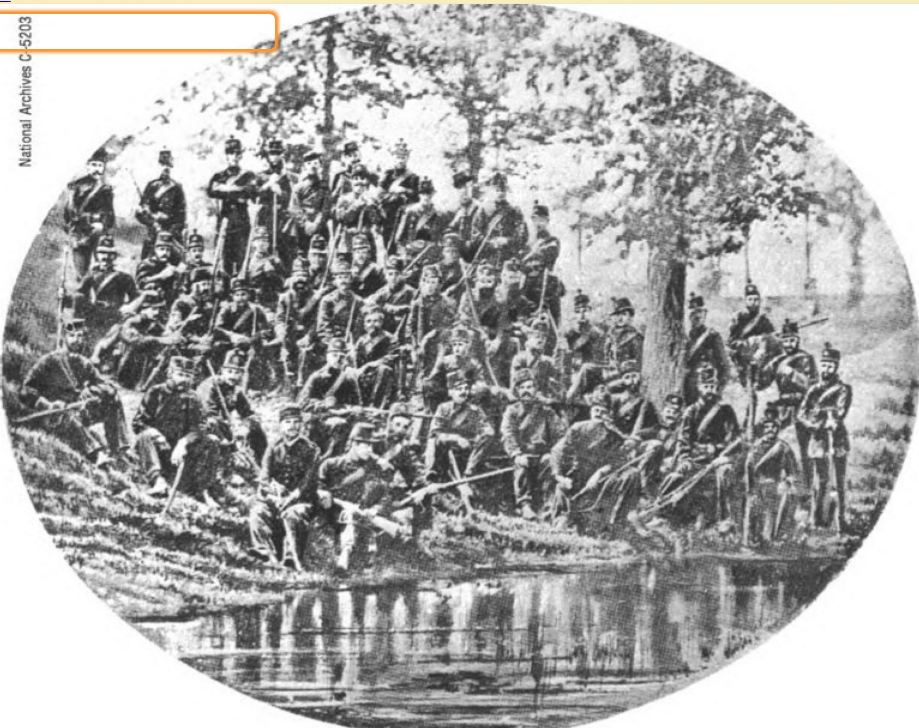
5th Company of the Queen's Own Rifles prior to the battle

The Canadian units at Ridgeway were the Queen's Own Rifles of Toronto (which had 7 killed, 2 died of wounds and 21 wounded in the battle); the 13th Battalion, predecessor of the modern Royal Hamilton Light Infantry (which had 15 wounded) and the York Rifle Company and the Caledonia Rifle Company of the Haldimand County Militia, predecessors of the Haldimand Rifles (of which the latter had 2 men wounded). Additionally, Company 9, Queen’s Own Rifles, consisted of 28 students and a lecturer from the University Rifles, which was raised at University College (3 students died in the battle: Malcolm MacKenzie, William Tempest, and John Mewburn). Alexander Muir, author of the unofficial Canadian national anthem, "The Maple Leaf Forever", fought with the Queen's Own at Ridgeway.

== Invasion ==
=== First day of Fenian crossings ===
The Fenian insurgents, led by Brigadier General John O'Neill, a former Union cavalry commander who had specialized in anti-guerrilla warfare in Ohio, secured boats and transferred some 800 men across the Niagara River, landing above Fort Erie, before dawn on June 1, 1866.

An additional 200–400 Fenians and supplies crossed later during the morning and early afternoon until the US Navy gunboat, the USS Michigan, began intercepting Fenian barges at 2:20 p.m. — 13 hours after the first Fenian advance party landed in Canada.

An advance party of 250 men of Lieutenant Colonel George Owen Starr's 17th Kentucky Fenian Regiment landed in Canada at about 1:30 AM and raised a large Fenian green flag with a gold Irish harp some two hours in advance of O'Neill's main force. Starr's advance party rushed to seize the town, cut telegraph wires and take control of the railway yards south of Fort Erie by dawn as the rest of O'Neill's force was disembarking. U.S. authorities also allowed unarmed men to board the ferry from Buffalo and small boats freely crossed the Niagara River until the afternoon. It is estimated that at least 1,000 and possibly as many as 1,350 Fenians in total crossed during the first thirteen hours of June 1, but it is impossible to determine a precise number.

O'Neill spent the first day trying to rally the local citizenry to the Fenian cause and to commandeer supplies for his mission, but his force was plagued by desertions almost from the outset. By nightfall, O'Neill estimated that he had perhaps 500 men remaining in his camp. Later during the night, O'Neill was reinforced by an additional column of 200 Fenians who had been deployed earlier on a bridgehead at Black Creek guarding against an approach from Chippawa in the north, bringing his total strength at Ridgeway to at least 650 men. A proclamation was posted explaining the reasons behind the invasion:

“We come among you as the foes of British rule in Ireland, exiled from that native land of ours by the oppression of British aristocracy and legislation, our people hunted down to the emigrant ships, or worse, to that charnel of government institutions, the poor-house … We have taken up the sword to strike down the oppressor’s rod and deliver Ireland from the tyrant … We have no issue with the people of these provinces, and wish to have none but the most friendly relations … Our blows shall be directed only at the power of England …" .

=== Battle ===
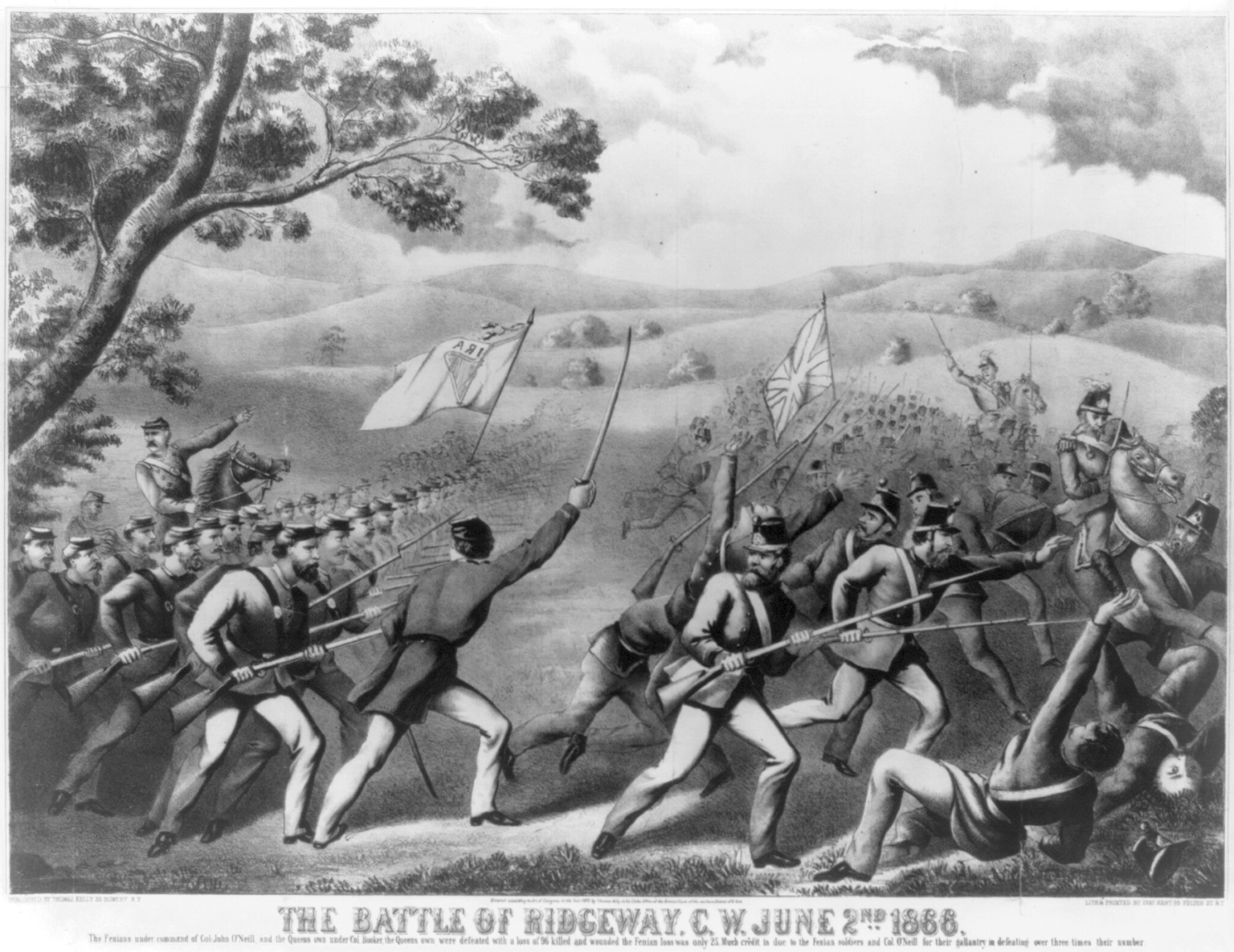
Fenian forces charging at the Canadian Militia defending Ridgeway

Meanwhile, the British were mobilizing both local Canadian militia and British garrison troops to defend against the impending invasion of Canada. The Fenians night-marched north across Black Creek (Ontario) through a cedar swamp, then turned inland on Ridge Road on the morning of June 2; taking up a defensive position on Limestone Ridge near the present Canadian town of Ridgeway. There, they clashed with 850 advancing soldiers of the Canadian militia (the dark-green uniformed Queen's Own Rifles of Toronto and the traditionally clad red-coated 13th Battalion from Hamilton, reinforced by two local companies from Caledonia and York) commanded by Lieutenant Colonel Alfred Booker of the 13th Battalion. In the first hour of the battle, the Canadian soldiers drove Fenian skirmishers back across Bertie Road. Then something went wrong: to this day, it is not clear exactly what. Some sources say that the Canadian militiamen mistook Fenian scouts on horseback for cavalry. Orders to form a square to defend against a cavalry charge, although quickly countermanded, led to chaos in the Canadian ranks, and Booker ordered a withdrawal after ninety minutes of battle. Other sources indicate that troops mistook a company of redcoated 13th Battalion infantry for British troops relieving them and began to withdraw; which then triggered a panic among other troops who mistook the withdrawal for a retreat. O'Neill, observing the chaos beginning in the Canadian forces, ordered a bayonet charge that routed the mostly-inexperienced Canadians. The Fenians took and briefly held the town of Ridgeway. Then, expecting to be overwhelmed by British reinforcements, they withdrew toward Fort Erie, where they fought the Battle of Fort Erie, against a small detachment of Canadian soldiers determined on holding the town.

The Canadian loss was 9 killed, 37 wounded (some severely enough to require amputation), and 22 died of wounds or disease later. One British soldier, Corporal Carrington, 47th (Lancashire) Regiment of Foot, died on a forced march from Chippawa to Stevensville. His grave was identified 146 years later on the eve of Remembrance Day 2012. O'Neill claimed he had one or two men killed, but Canadians claimed more. The relatively low casualty figures support proponents of theories about soldiers' reluctance to shoot to kill but could also be accounted for by the fact the Fenians at first deployed only skirmishers. This was done in an attempt to lure Canadian soldiers towards their main force, which did not advance until the last minutes of the battle, when it attacked with bayonets to break the Canadian lines.

=== Fenian withdrawal ===
The battle at Ridgeway was followed by a Fenian victory later in the afternoon over the heavily outnumbered Canadian volunteer Welland Field Battery (armed as an infantry unit) and the Dunnville Naval Brigade at Fort Erie. Nevertheless, the rapid convergence of large British and Canadian reinforcements convinced many of the Fenians to return in haste to the United States – some on logs, on rafts, or by swimming. O'Neill and 850 Fenians surrendered their arms to waiting U.S. authorities. In his book, 1916: The Easter Rising, Tim Pat Coogan said the force was described at the time as the Irish Republican Army.

== Aftermath ==
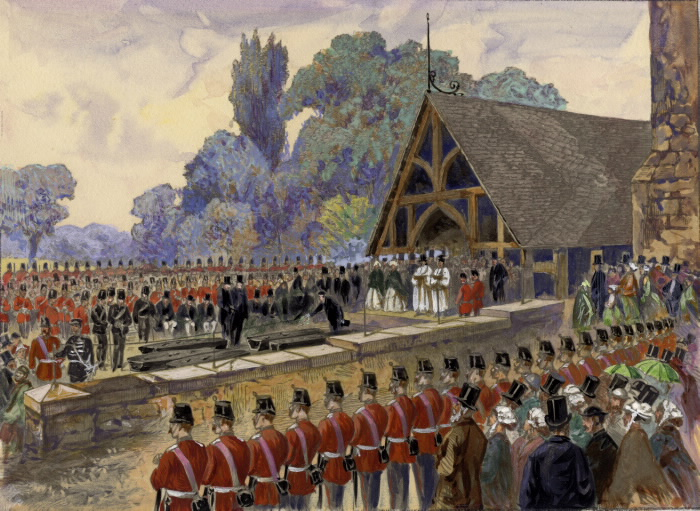
Funeral for Canadian militiamen at St. James Cemetery in Toronto

Some of the Canadians were particularly bitter at what they saw as Booker's mismanagement of the battle and believed that had he not given the order to withdraw they would have won the day. In fact, the Canadians were only fighting the Fenian advance units, who were steadily luring the Canadians forward towards the main Fenian force, which was waiting for them on the high ground north of Bertie Road. Had the Canadians not retreated, short on ammunition and inexperienced, they might have faced a heavier defeat by the Civil War veterans of the main Fenian army (which was so well-supplied with ammunition that they dumped thousands of rounds into Black Creek on the eve of the battle in order to lighten their load.) The Fenians were so experienced in handling their single-shot muzzle-loading weapons that it was wrongly reported that they were all armed with seven-shot Spencer repeating rifles. Fewer than half of the Canadians on the field had practised firing live rounds before the day of the battle and there had been no military conflict in Canada since the Rebellions of 1837–38.

Since the Queen's Own Rifles have been continuously active in the Canadian military since 1860, the men who fell or were wounded at Limestone Ridge can be considered the first casualties of the Canadian Army; even though it was not formally established as such until 1883. Ensign Malcolm McEachren of No. 5 Company, QOR, killed leading his men in the opening minutes of the battle, can therefore be considered the Canadian army's first man killed in action. The final casualty figures for the Fenian Raids into Canada 1866, when including deaths from disease while on service in both Canada West (Ontario) and Canada East (Quebec), were calculated by the Militia Department in 1868 as 32 dead and 103 wounded or felled by disease (including a female civilian accidentally shot by the militia). One British soldier from the 47th Lancashire Regiment of Foot, Corporal Carrington, died from heat stroke on a forced march from Chippawa to Stevensville on the morning of the battle. His grave was identified in November 2012.

== Legacy ==
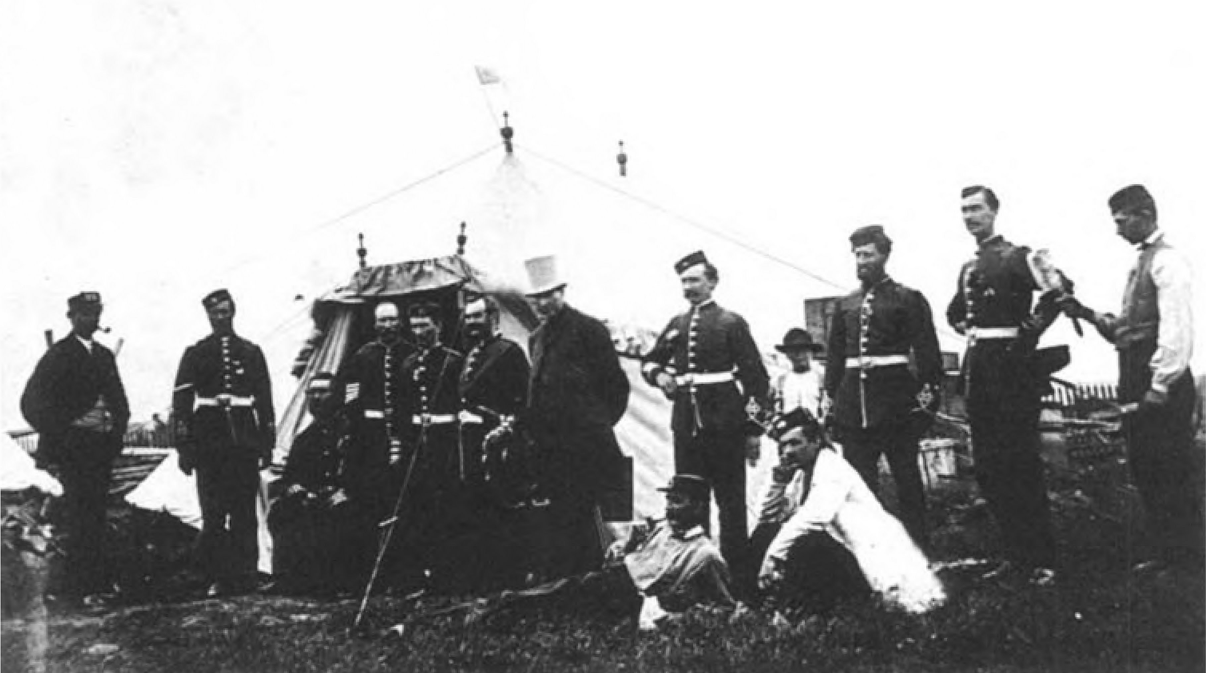
Canadian militiamen during the battle. The Militia Department attempted to portray the battle as a result of inexperienced soldiers, rather than blame its officers, or the government for inadequate supplies.

The Canadian press exaggerated the scope and nature of the defeat at Ridgeway, particularly anti-confederationist press which claimed Ridgeway was proof that Canadians will never be able to defend themselves without the presence of the British Army. The inefficiency of the Militia Department under Canada West's attorney general and minister of militia John A. Macdonald was covered up by two Military Boards of Inquiry that concluded that the blame lay with inexperienced frontline troops that panicked and broke, and not with the officers who led them and the government who undersupplied and undertrained them. The Battle of Ridgeway became a point of shame in Canadian national military heritage and history and the Canadian government was reluctant to recognize or acknowledge the veterans of the battle for nearly 25 years.

In 1890, the Veterans of '66 Association held a protest demonstration at the Volunteers Monument in Queen's Park by laying flowers at the foot of the monument on June 2, the 24th anniversary of the battle of Ridgeway. It took a 10-year campaign of protest and lobbying for the Canadian government to sanction a Fenian Raid Medal and land grants to veterans in 1899–1900. The protest became an annual memorial event known as Decoration Day, when graves and monuments of Canadian soldiers were "decorated" in flowers. For the next 40 years from 1890 to 1931, Decoration Day would be Canada's popular national memorial day, the first Remembrance Day, commemorated on the weekend nearest to June 2 and acknowledging Canadian dead in the Battle of Ridgeway, the North-West Rebellion (1885), the South African War (1899–1902), and the Great War (1914–1918). In 1931 the Remembrance Day Act established November 11, Armistice Day, as Canada's national official memorial day. At the same time the act removed the casualties of Ridgeway and the Northwest Rebellion from national memorialization, fixing Remembrance Day to Canadian casualties overseas starting from the South African War.

The Battle of Ridgeway was Canada's first modern battle, the first fought exclusively by Canadian troops and led on the battlefield entirely by Canadian officers, the battle in which Canada's current modern military sustained its first thirty troops killed in action, and the last battle fought within the present-day boundaries of Ontario against a foreign invasion.

=== Memory ===
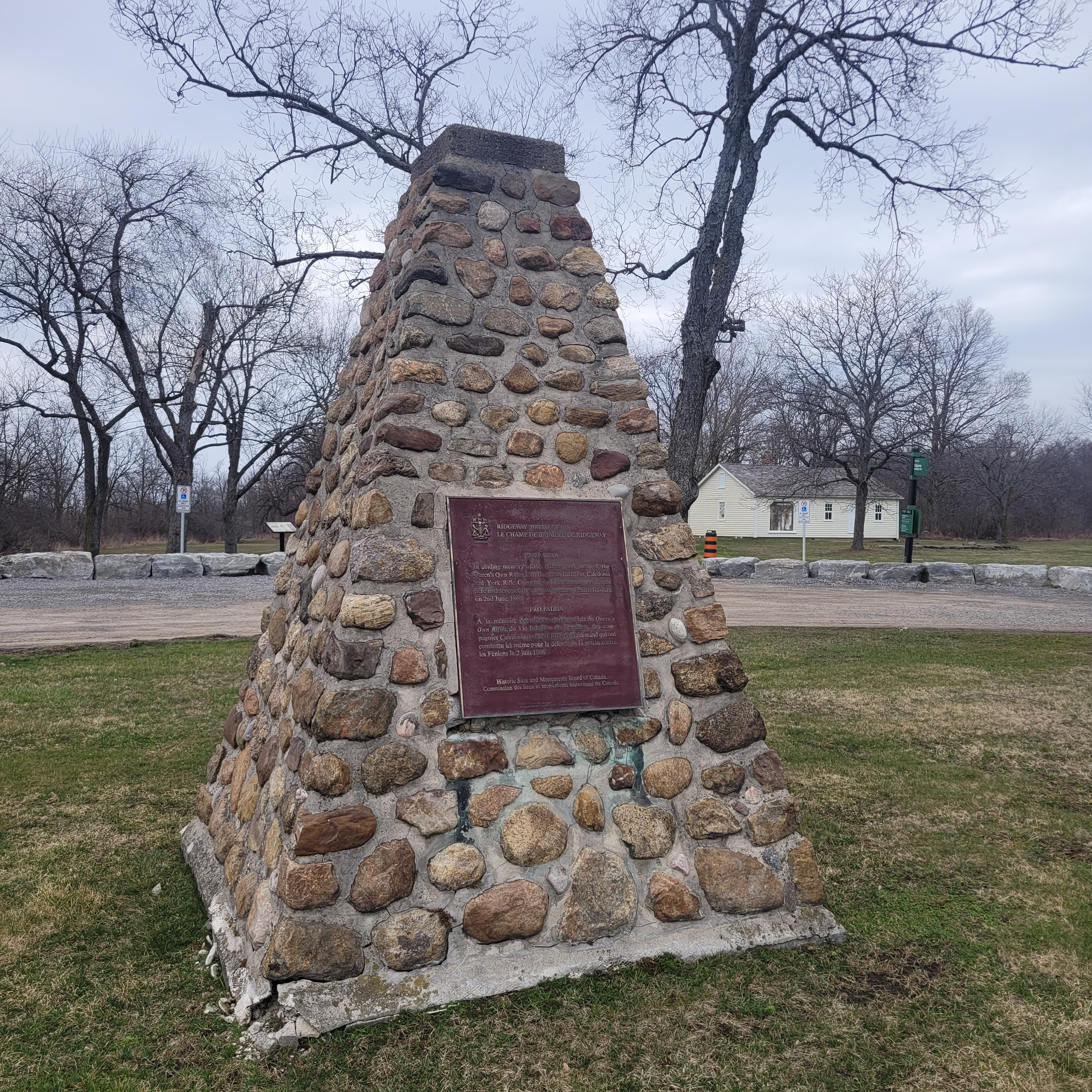
Cairn and plaque, Ridgeway Battlefield National Historic Site

The site of the battle is commemorated by a cairn and interpretive signs on the north side of Garrison Road between Ridge Road and Burleigh Road. The location has been designated as a national historic site. A historic house (which was not involved in the battle) has also been moved to the site.

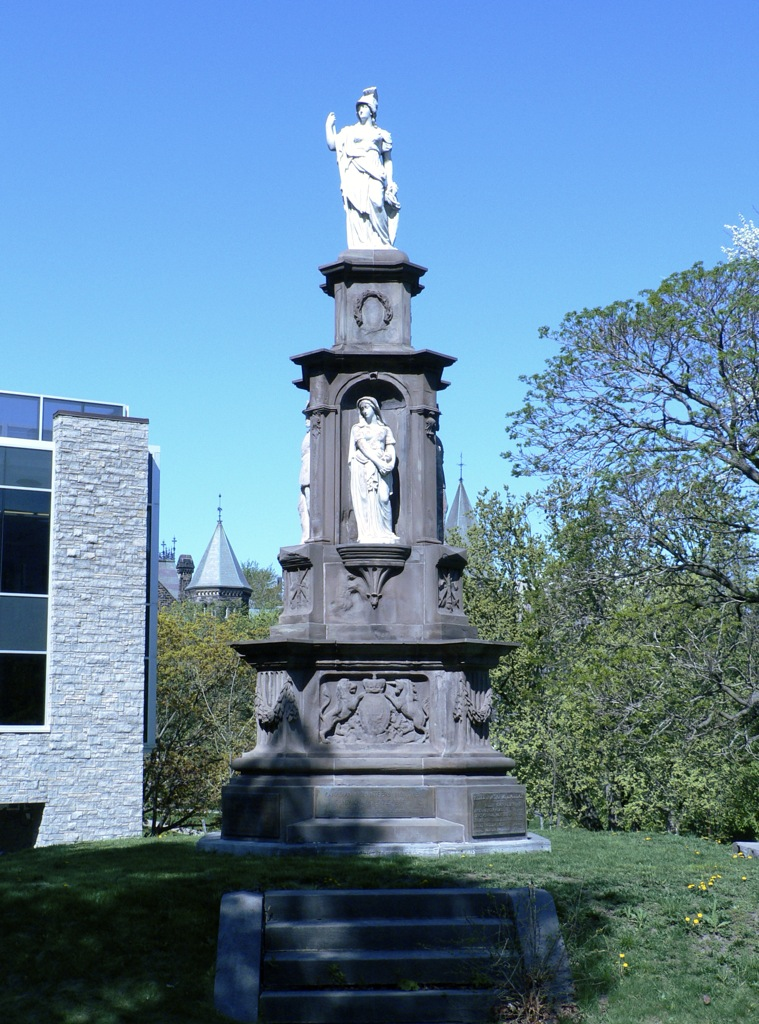
The Canadian Volunteer Monument in Queen's Park, Toronto, honouring volunteers of the Canadian Militia.

The Canadian Volunteer Monument in Queen's Park, Toronto, honours nine Toronto militia volunteers from The Queen's Own Rifles of Canada including three University of Toronto student volunteers who died in the battle, and is on the west side of Queen's Park Crescent (43°39′45.55″N 079°23′36.01″W).

In March 2012 a monument was unveiled in Tow Path Park, Buffalo, New York, near the site where the Irish troops assembled prior to the invasion.

== Order of battle ==
Canadian Militia order of battle	Fenians (Irish Republican Army – IRA) order of battle
1st Brigade, 2nd Division, Napier's Corps (Lt. Col. Booker, commanding officer sans brigade staff): 2nd Battalion Volunteer Militia Rifles of Toronto "The Queen's Own Rifles" (Major Gillmor) [481 officers and men]; 13th Battalion Volunteer Militia of Hamilton (Booker remaining in command, Major Skinner, 2nd-in-command, commanding right wing at Ridgeway) [16 officers and 249 men]; York Rifle Company, Volunteer Militia of Haldimand County (Captain Davis) attached to QOR [3 officers and 44 men]; Caledonia Rifle Company, Volunteer Militia of Haldimand County (Captain Jackson) attached 13th Battalion [4 officers and 44 men]; Total strength: 841 officers and men plus several dozen armed volunteer civilians, county sheriffs and magistrates, revenue officers and two Frontier Constabulary officers and two chaplains, Presbyterian David Inglis and Methodist Nathaniel Burwash, first chaplains in history to accompany Canadian troops onto a field of battle.	"Lynch's Brigade", "O'Neill's Brigade" or "Irish Army at Buffalo" (Brigadier General O'Neill, commanding officer (vice Brig. Gen. Lynch, absent) Colonel George Owen Starr, second-in-command Major John C. Canty (Fort Erie, Canada West), chief of staff/intelligence Lieutenant Rudolph Fitzpatrick, aide-de-camp.): 7th Buffalo "Irish Army of Liberation" (Col. John Hoy [Hoye]) [a conservatively low estimate of 150 men, considering Buffalo's proximity to the scene of action] Casualties: 7-8 men wounded: 2d Lt. Finnegan; Michael Bailey wounded in the breast; Michael Porter either slightly wounded or shot badly in groin; Michael Rafferty wounded in the abdomen; Michael Yearly-slightly wounded in arm; 13th Tennessee Regiment of Nashville (commanded by Captain Lawrence Shields, in place of O'Neill acting brigade commander) reinforced by 200 men from Memphis (Captain Michael Conlon) (total 315 men). Casualties: S. Thompson killed Michael Keffy wounded in arm; 17th Kentucky Regiment of Louisville (Col. Owen Starr) [144 men] plus *2 companies attached from Terre Haute, Indiana, (Captain Hugh [James] Haggerty and Color Sergeant Michael Cochrane).Casualties: Five reported wounded; 2 men from Louisville, Ky: James Kegan wounded in the ankle; Michael Rafferty wounded in the arm; 3 men from Indiana: Thomas Maddox of Anderson wounded in the thigh; John Ryan age 17 of Terre Haute wounded in the abdomen; Welch -slightly wounded [no residence given]; 18th Ohio Regiment of "Cleveland Rangers" (Capt. Buckley) [50–100 men estimated] Casualties: Daniel Wheelan of Company A wounded in neck; 19th Ohio Regiment of Cincinnati "Irish Republic Volunteers" (Lt. Col. John Grace) [220 men] Casualties: Edward [or Richard] Scully killed at Ridgeway; reburied Cincinnati, Ohio; James Gerrighty mortally wounded and left on field; Matthew Crouty wounded in the hand; Michael McLaughlin wounded in the eye; New Orleans company "Louisiana Tigers", (Capt. J. W. Dempsey) [100 men]; A small unidentified troop of mounted scouts believed to be from Buffalo of unknown strength riding horses seized on the Canadian side, [estimated at 25–50 men]; Total strength upon landing at Fort Erie June 1, 1866, approx. 1000–1350; total strength at Battle of Ridgeway June 2, 1866, approx. 700–800 men.
