= Bernard Doran Killian =

- Born: February 12, 1836; Rostrevor, Ireland
- Died: November 7, 1914 (aged 78); Brooklyn
- Burial place: St. Peter's Cemetery (Staten Island)
- Occupation(s): lawyer, newspaper editor, politician
- Known for: Fenian attempt to capture Campobello Island

Bernard Doran Killian was an Irish-born American newspaper editor, lawyer, politician and writer. He was a prominent member of the Fenian Brotherhood who led a failed attempt to capture Campobello Island in 1866.

== Early life ==
Killian was born in 1836 in Rostrevor, Ireland and emigrated to the United States with his parents in 1850. He studied law and was admitted to the bar in 1857 at the age of 21, after which he moved to St. Louis, Missouri.

== Newspaper editor ==
In June 1853 Killian founded the Buffalo Sentinel, a Catholic journal in Buffalo, New York. He owned and edited the newspaper until 1854. Killian worked at Thomas D'Arcy McGee's American Celt when it was headquartered in Buffalo. When the American Celt was moved to New York City Killian became associate editor and edited the newspaper when McGee was absent in 1854. In 1857 Killian was editing The New York Tablet, a new Irish-American Catholic newspaper.

Killian moved to St. Louis, Missouri and started the Western Banner, a Catholic newspaper which he edited from October 1858 until March 1861. The establishment of the Western Banner was funded by a $3000 subsidy from Peter Richard Kenrick, the Archbishop of St. Louis. The newspaper's editorial stance was not abolitionist but it opposed the secession of the Southern states, expressing "anxiety over the fate of the Union" and urging "compromise".

== Politician in Missouri ==
Killian was active in the Democratic Party in St. Louis. He served two terms in the Missouri Senate and chaired the Missouri Democratic State Committee.

== Fenian activities ==
In June 1865 the Irish nationalist journalist John Mitchel was imprisoned in Fort Monroe, Virginia. Killian, a member of the Fenian Brotherhood, was sent by the Fenian leader John O'Mahony to Washington, D.C., where he met with president Andrew Johnson and secretary of state William Seward on 13 October 1865 to lobby for Mitchel's release. Johnson agreed to release Mitchel on condition that he leave the United States. When he appeared at the Fenian Brotherhood convention in Philadelphia later that month Killian reported that he had asked Seward and Johnson what the American response would be if the Fenians were to invade and seize territory in British North America. He said that they had told him they would "acknowledge accomplished facts".

A new constitution adopted at the Philadelphia convention provided for an executive branch consisting of a president and cabinet on the one hand and an elected senate on the other. O'Mahony was elected president and head of the executive branch, with William Roberts as head of the senate. Thomas Sweeny was named secretary of war and Killian was appointed secretary of the treasury.

The Fenian leadership was divided over the best way of achieving Irish independence. O'Mahony supported the organization's original objective of waging war on the British in Ireland, while Roberts advocated attacking them in Canada. Killian persuaded O'Mahony to approve a campaign to seize Campobello, an island belonging to New Brunswick situated in the Bay of Fundy and separated by a narrow channel from the state of Maine. On March 17 1866 O'Mahony authorized Killian to lead an expedition to seize Campobello. The plan was to use the island as "a base from which to launch an invasion of Ireland and gain belligerent status to legally issue letters of marque to privateers who could disrupt British sea trade". In early April Killian and a group of several hundred Fenians arrived in Eastport, Maine, which was intended to be the staging ground for the attack on Campobello. A ship had been loaded with arms and was on its way to Eastport.

Killian's plan to seize Campobello failed. The United States government had sent General George Meade to Eastport to enforce American neutrality, and he seized and impounded the Fenians' shipment of arms when he arrived on April 19. Meanwhile the Royal Navy sent several ships to defend Passamaquoddy Bay and several hundred British army reinforcements under the command of Sir Charles Hastings Doyle arrived at the nearby town of Saint Andrews, New Brunswick on April 19. After unsuccessfully trying to persuade Meade that the armed Fenians were in the area on a "fishing party" and having been denied further funding from Fenian headquarters in New York, Killian left Eastport by train for Portland, Maine on April 19. The remaining Fenians left Eastport over the following weeks, Killian was expelled from the organization, and O'Mahony was forced to resign his leadership.

== Lawyer in New York City ==
Killian later moved to New York City, where he practiced as a member of the law firm Killian, Zeller and Mehling. He was also a poet and author. Among his poems were "The Obelisk", commemorating the erection of Cleopatra's Needle in Central Park in 1881, and "The Statue of Liberty" in 1886. He lived on Staten Island, where he was involved in the introduction of the trolley service. He moved to the Flatbush neighbourhood of Brooklyn two years before his death on November 6, 1914. He had three daughters and three sons, one of whom predeceased him.
