= Michael Doheny =

Irish writer and poet (1805–1863)

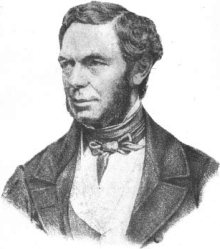
- Born: 22 May 1805; Brookhill, near Fethard, County Tipperary
- Died: 1 April 1862 (aged 56); New York City, United States
- Military career
- Allegiance: Young Ireland; Irish Republican Brotherhood
- Conflicts: Young Irelander Rebellion of 1848; Fenian Rising

Lt. Col. Michael Doheny (22 May 1805 – 1 April 1862) was an Irish writer, lawyer, member of the Young Ireland movement, and co-founder of the Irish Republican Brotherhood, an Irish secret society which would go on to launch the Fenian Raids on Canada, Fenian Rising of 1867, and the Easter Rising of 1916, each of which was an attempt to bring about Irish Independence from Britain.

== Early life ==
The third son of small farmer Michael Doheny, he was born at Brookhill, near Fethard, County Tipperary. Growing up, he received a rudimentary education from an itinerant teacher while working on his father's farm. He would continue his formal education into his adult life while simultaneously acting as a teacher himself to local children. Doheny's ambition was to receive a formal legal education so that he could become a lawyer capable of seeking redress for members of his community, who were generally poor.

Doheny's parents both died in his teens, leaving Doheny's eldest brother, himself only in his teenage years, as head of the household. Doheny fought through a bout of typhus at the age of 14. When he was 20, Doheny's eldest brother died and the family farm came into his procession. He subsequently sold it and continued to focus on his education.

Doheny was admitted to Gray's Inn in November 1834 and King's Inns in 1835 before being called to the Irish bar in 1838. Doheny would set up business in Cashel, County Tipperary and would be appointed legal assessor to the borough of Cashel under the Municipal Corporations (Ireland) Act 1840. This allowed him to successfully prosecute former borough officers for corruption, including misappropriation of funds and fraudulent transfers of property, which won Doheny wider acclaim.

== Entering politics ==
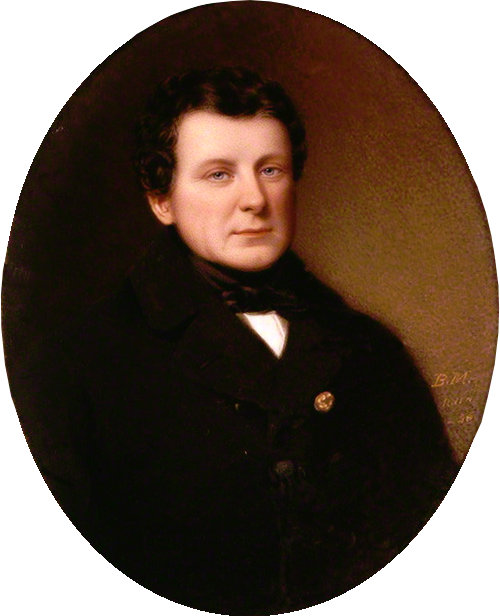
Doheny was drawn towards Daniel O'Connell's Repeal Association in the 1830s, but by the 1840s personal tension with O'Connell himself, amongst other reasons, lead Doheny to split with O'Connell's movement.

In 1830, Doheny acted as an election warden in the successful campaign of Thomas Wyse to become an MP for Tipperary. It was through Wyse's people that Doheny became involved in Daniel O'Connell's Repeal Association. The Repeal Association was part of the movement in Ireland which sought to repeal the Act of Union, which had dissolved the Parliament of Ireland. In 1841, he formally joined the Repeal Association. In May 1841, Doheny was placed on the association's general committee. O'Connell found Doheny difficult to control and was unsettled by Doheny's queries into the association's financial management.

By 1842, Doheny had established himself as a successor lawyer in and around Cashel. In that year he married Mary Jane O'Dwyer and they into a new house in Cashel alongside Mary Jane's mother. In the years to come, Michael and Mary Jane would have four children together; Morgan, Michael, Edmond and Jane Doheny.

It was also in 1842 that Doheny began to associate with the more militant members of the repeal movement such as Thomas Davis. There was a divide in both age and class between the rural Doheny and the Davis' clique, many of whom looked down upon Doheny. Others, however, acknowledged him for his passion, with one of his colleagues anonymously remarked of Doheny that he was "rough, generous, bold, a son of the soil, slovenly in dress, red-haired and red-featured, but a true personification of the hopes, passions, and traditions of the people". Doheny assisted in the launch of The Nation, a newspaper that served as an outlet for Young Irelander thoughts. Doheny quickly became annoyed when the editors rejected a significant number of his article. It was also around this period that Doheny published History of the American Revolution in the pages of The Nation.

It was suggested by historians James Quinn and Desmond McCabe that Doheny may have been a better orator than a writer, and that he excelled more so during public meetings of the repeal movement around Tipperary and in Dublin. Viewing the large crowds who would come to attend these "monster" meetings in 1843, Doheny became to believe there was a military potential in these same people. Doheny would later claim that, alongside Thomas Davis and John Blake Dillon, he deliberately ran repeal meetings with military undertones in order to prepare the Irish peasantry for a future war with the British. However, historians have doubted the credibility of that claim and suggested it is a revisionist claim.

In 1845, Doheny was asked by the Repeal Association to use his legal knowledge to investigate if Irish Members of Parliament had the legal right to withdraw from the House of Commons ("Abstentionism"). Doheny reluctantly submitted that, in his legal opinion, this course of action could result in legal action being taken against MPs who abstained. This was not what Daniel O'Connell wanted to hear, leading to a souring of the relationship between the two. Tensions continued to mount between the two when O'Connell took offence to Doheny's view that university education in Ireland should be of a secular/non-denominational nature during public debates over the Maynooth College Act 1845. Also in 1845, a parliamentary seat became vacant in Tipperary. Doheny would have been a good candidate to stand for that seat, however, he was passed over for the selection by O'Connell's Repeal party.

In April 1846, William Smith O'Brien was imprisoned for a month for refusing to serve on a parliamentary committee. The controversy resulted in a stark split amongst the emerging Young Ireland movement and O'Connell's Repealers. Doheny and the Young Ireland movement backed O'Brien's conduct and became more vocal in their radical views. The two groups formally split in July 1846, and Doheny was one of the hardliners who resisted any attempts at reconciliation. Subsequently, Doheny was one of the co-founders of the Irish Confederation on 13 January 1847.

== Rebellion of 1848 ==
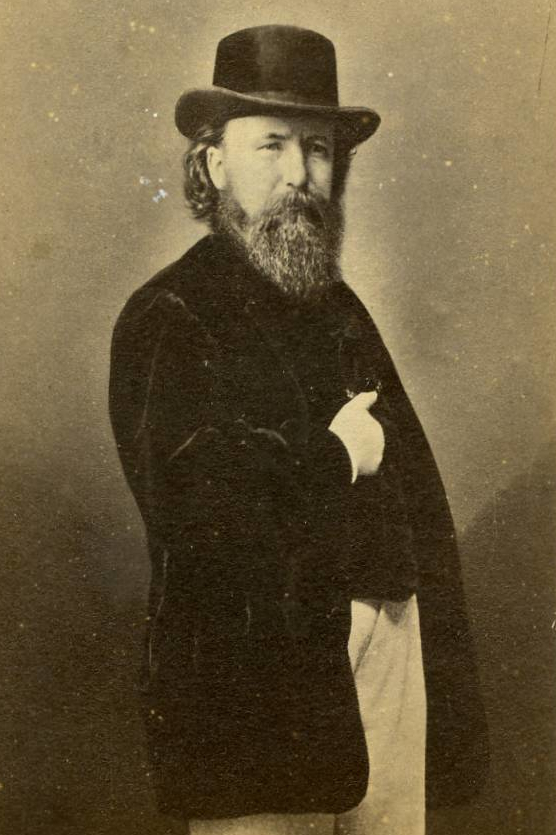
Following the failure of the 1848 rebellion, Doheny partnered up with Stephens to evade escape from the British. The two would eventually escape to France, then the United States. Years later, the two would found the Irish Republican Brotherhood together.

During the summer of 1847, Doheny began setting up "Confederate Clubs" around Tipperary as well as helping James Fintan Lalor's attempt to set up a tenant's league branch in Holycross.

Doheny was among a small amount of Young Irelanders attracted to Lalor's revolutionary agrarian philosophy. However, he supported Smith O'Brien over John Mitchel in January 1848 when Mitchel called for revolution. Doheny's position changed after Mitchel was convicted for treason felony in May, with Doheny now prepared to support an outright rebellion. In turn, Doheny was arrested for seditious speechmaking on 12 July in Cashel. He was bailed out on 20 July, 9 days before the beginning of the Young Ireland rebellion. Doheny attempted to raise men in Tipperary, but his efforts were held back by William Smith O'Brien's indecisiveness.

After action in Ballingarry on 31 July fell apart, Doheny fled to the Mountain of Slievenamon. For the next two months Doheny evaded the authorities alongside James Stephens across Munster. On Sept. 8, 1848, he penned a poem "Song of a Fugitive" at a location described as a "Cool Mountain Wood". Doheny eventually escaped Ireland by dressing as a priest and boarding a cattle ship travelling from Cork to Bristol. From there, Doheny proceeded to Paris in France, where he reunited with Stephens. The two were joined by fellow rebel John O'Mahony. The trio remained in Paris for two months before departing for New York City.

== Life in the US ==
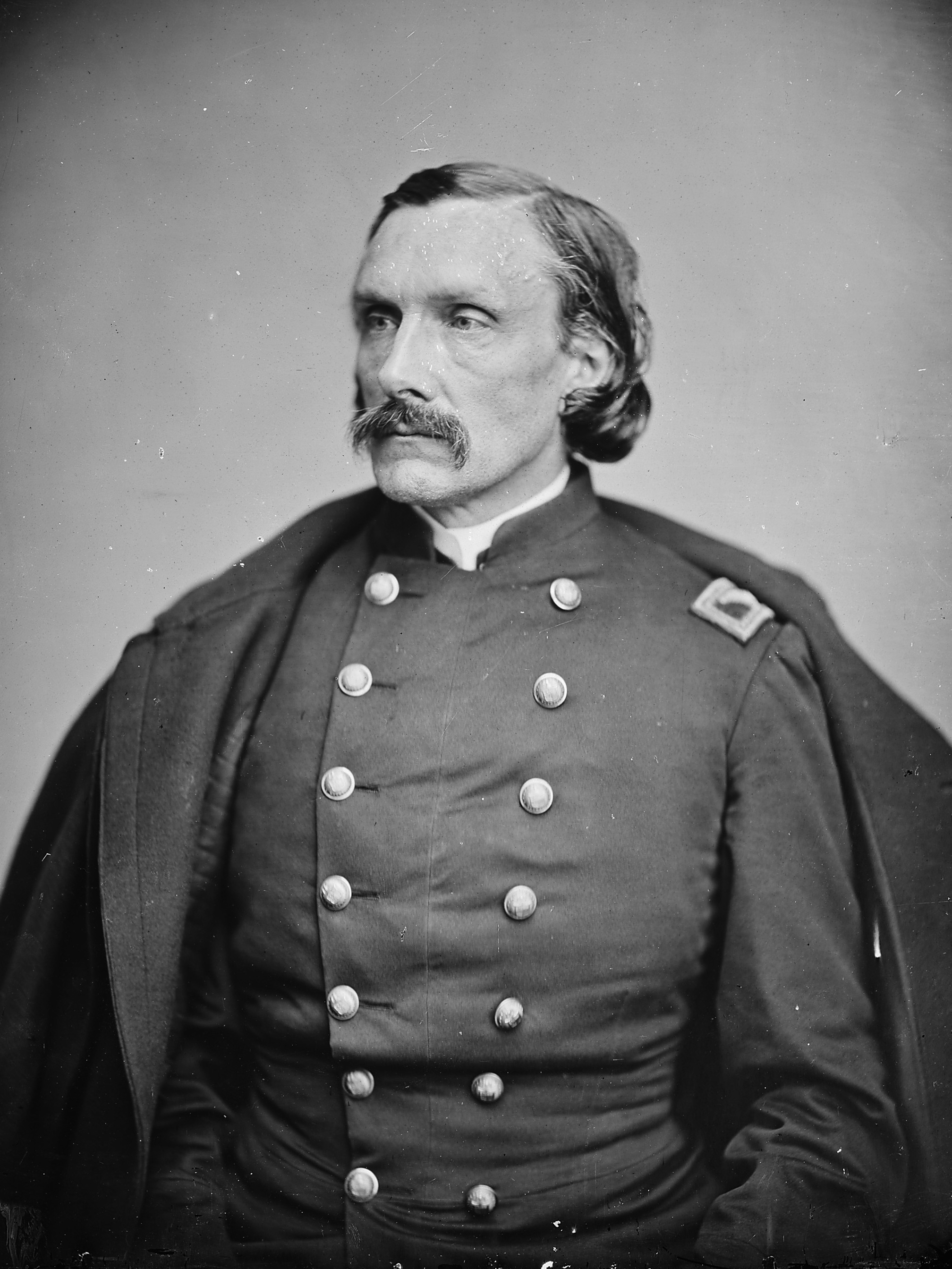
While in the United States, Doheny collaborated with John O'Mahony many times.

Upon immigrating to the United States, Doheny returned to practising law in order to support himself. However, he remained active in Irish Republican circles, which were common in the city as it swelled with other Young Irelander exiles. There were tensions amongst the conservative and radical Young Irelanders in New York, exemplified by an incident involving Doheny and Thomas D'Arcy McGee. Accounts of the incident vary. One version suggests that McGee accused Doheny of boasting, drunkenness, and incompetence and in response Doheny attempted to push McGee down an open cellar on the street they were walking. Historians James Quinn and Desmond McCabe note that John Blake Dillon made similar accusations against Doheny, and therefore they may not have been without foundation. Another account of the altercation between Doheny and McGee suggests that Doheny challenged McGee to a duel, but McGee refused. Enraged, Doheny assaulted McGee. McGee was apparently arrested but not charged with a crime.

Unfortunately for Doheny, this was not the only violent altercation he was involved in during this first year in America. Doheny was involved in a public debate over the policies of Daniel O'Connell with O'Connell loyalist Patrick H. O’Conner. After the event, Doheny and O'Conner confronted each other in the street and got into a fistfight. A duel between the two was arranged, but supposedly on the day it was due to occur, O'Conner departed for Ireland.

In 1849, Doheny wrote the book The Felon's track, which recounted in a very critical way the history of the repeal movement and the 1848 rebellion. Doheny was particularly critical of O'Connell's involvement. The book was quite successful and reprinted several times. In turn, Doheny became in demand as a speaker at Irish-American societies. Doheny also contributed a memoir on Geoffrey Keating, a 17th-century Irish historian from Doheny's native Tipperary, and John O'Mahony's translation of Foras Feasa ar Éirinn, which O'Mahony was working on for several years.

From his initial arrival in New York, Doheny had become involved in the city's Irish-centric militias. In November 1851, Doheny was elected as Lieutenant Colonel of the 69th New York Infantry Regiment and in September 1852, he became Colonel of a new regiment the Irish Republican Rifles. These Irish controlled militias generally had Irish Independence as an objective but were often fraught with infighting over strategy and leadership battles.

In February 1856, Doheny and O'Mahony founded the Emmet Monument Association, an organisation with the publicly stated goal of funding a monument to Irish rebel leader Robert Emmet, but with the private goal of unifying Irish Republicans in America under one banner. Upon the outbreak of the Crimean War in March 1857, Doheny and O'Mahony met with the Russian consul in New York and sought to secure backing for another rebellion in Ireland from the Russian Empire. They presented the consul with a request from the various Irish militias for transport of 2,000 men and arms for another 5,000 to Ireland. The request was sent back to Russia, where supposedly there was some interest in the plan. However, ultimately the plot was considered unaffordable by the Russians. The failure to secure the backing of the Russians is suggested to have demoralised many of the Irish-American organisations, causing some of them to fall apart.

Doheny and O'Mahony, responding to the fragmentation, reached out to James Stephens in the autumn of 1857. Stephens agreed to aid them, but in return asked for undisputed leadership of any proposed grouping. Stephens had just founded the Irish Republican Brotherhood on 17 March 1858, and in turn, Doheny and O'Mahony agreed to organise its American counterpart the Fenian Brotherhood in early 1859. That same year, Doheny and O'Mahoney co-founded the short-lived newspaper The Phoenix, with the financial backing of Doheny's cousin Michael Doheny Jr., to spread the ideals of the new Fenian movement.

Doheny was involved in the funeral arrangements for Terence Bellew MacManus in Ireland and acted as one of his pallbearers in a New York ceremony. Doheny travelled to Ireland in October 1861 to accompany the body home, where his spirits were lifted by the large crowds who came out not only to honour MacManus' body, but who cheered for "Colonel" Doheny. Doheny's morale was high for the enthusiasm he saw that he began to argue again for another rebellion in Ireland, but this line of thinking was overruled by James Stephens. After the funeral, Doheny made an emotional visit to Cashel in Tipperary where he was given a hero's welcome.

== Death ==
Not long after the McManus funeral, Doheny died on 1 April 1862. He was buried in Calvary Cemetery in Queens, New York.

== Works ==
Doheny is best known as author of a small work, The Felon's Track, (Text at Project Gutenberg) New York, 1867, and of two poems, "Achusha gal machree" and "The Outlaw's Wife."
