= Fenian Brotherhood =

Irish republican organisation

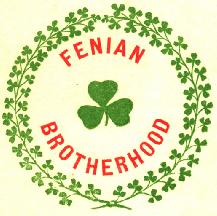
- Founder: John O'Mahony
- Founded: 1858
- Dissolved: 1880
- Preceded by: Emmet Monument Association
- Succeeded by: Clan na Gael
- Headquarters: New York City
- Ideology: Irish nationalism; Irish republicanism
- Irish affiliate: Irish Republican Brotherhood

The Fenian Brotherhood (Irish: Bráithreachas na bhFíníní) was an Irish republican organisation founded in the United States in 1858 by John O'Mahony and Michael Doheny. It was a precursor to Clan na Gael, a sister organisation to the Irish Republican Brotherhood (IRB). Members were commonly known as "Fenians". O'Mahony, who was a Gaelic scholar, named his organisation after the Fianna, the legendary band of Irish warriors led by Fionn mac Cumhaill.

== Background ==
The Fenian Brotherhood trace their origins back to 1790s, in the rebellion, seeking an end to British rule in Ireland initially for self-government and then the establishment of an Irish Republic. The rebellion was suppressed, but the principles of the United Irishmen were to have a powerful influence on the course of Irish history.

Following the collapse of the rebellion, the British Prime Minister William Pitt introduced a bill to abolish the Irish parliament and manufactured a Union between Ireland and Britain. Opposition from the Protestant oligarchy that controlled the parliament was countered by the widespread and open use of bribery. The Act of Union was passed and became law on 1 January 1801. The Catholics, who had been excluded from the Irish parliament, were promised emancipation under the Union. This promise was never kept and caused a protracted and bitter struggle for civil liberties. It was not until 1829 that the British government reluctantly conceded Catholic Emancipation. Though leading to general emancipation, this process simultaneously disenfranchised the small tenants, known as 'forty shilling freeholders', who were mainly Catholics.

Daniel O'Connell, who had led the emancipation campaign, then attempted the same methods in his campaign to have the Act of Union with Britain repealed. Despite the use of petitions and public meetings that attracted vast popular support, the government thought the Union was more important than Irish public opinion.

In the early 1840s, the younger members of the repeal movement became impatient with O'Connell's overcautious policies and began to question his intentions. Later they were what came to be known as the Young Ireland movement.

During the famine, the social class comprising small farmers and laborers was almost wiped out by starvation, disease and emigration. The Great Famine of the 1840s caused the deaths of 1 million Irish people and another million emigrated to escape it, with a further million over following decades. That the people starved while livestock and grain continued to be exported, quite often under military escort, would leave a legacy of bitterness and resentment among the survivors. The waves of emigration also ensured that such feelings would not be confined to Ireland, but spread to England, the United States, Australia and every country where Irish emigrants gathered.

Shocked by the scenes of starvation and greatly influenced by the revolutions then sweeping Europe, the Young Irelanders moved from agitation to armed rebellion in 1848. The attempted rebellion failed after a small skirmish in Ballingary, County Tipperary, coupled with a few minor incidents elsewhere. The revolt's failure was much influenced by the general weakening of the Irish population after three years of famine, mixed with premature promptings to rise up early, resulting in inadequate military preparations in turn contributing to disunity among the rebellion's leaders.

The Government quickly rounded up many of the instigators. Those who could, fled across the seas and their followers dispersed. The last flicker of revolt in 1849, led by amongst others James Fintan Lalor, was equally unsuccessful.

John Mitchel, the most committed advocate of revolution, had been arrested early in 1848 and transported to Australia on the expressly created charge of Treason-felony. He was to be joined by other leaders, such as William Smith O'Brien and Thomas Francis Meagher who had both been arrested after Ballingary escaped to France, as did three of the younger members, James Stephens, John O'Mahony and Michael Doheny.

== Founding ==
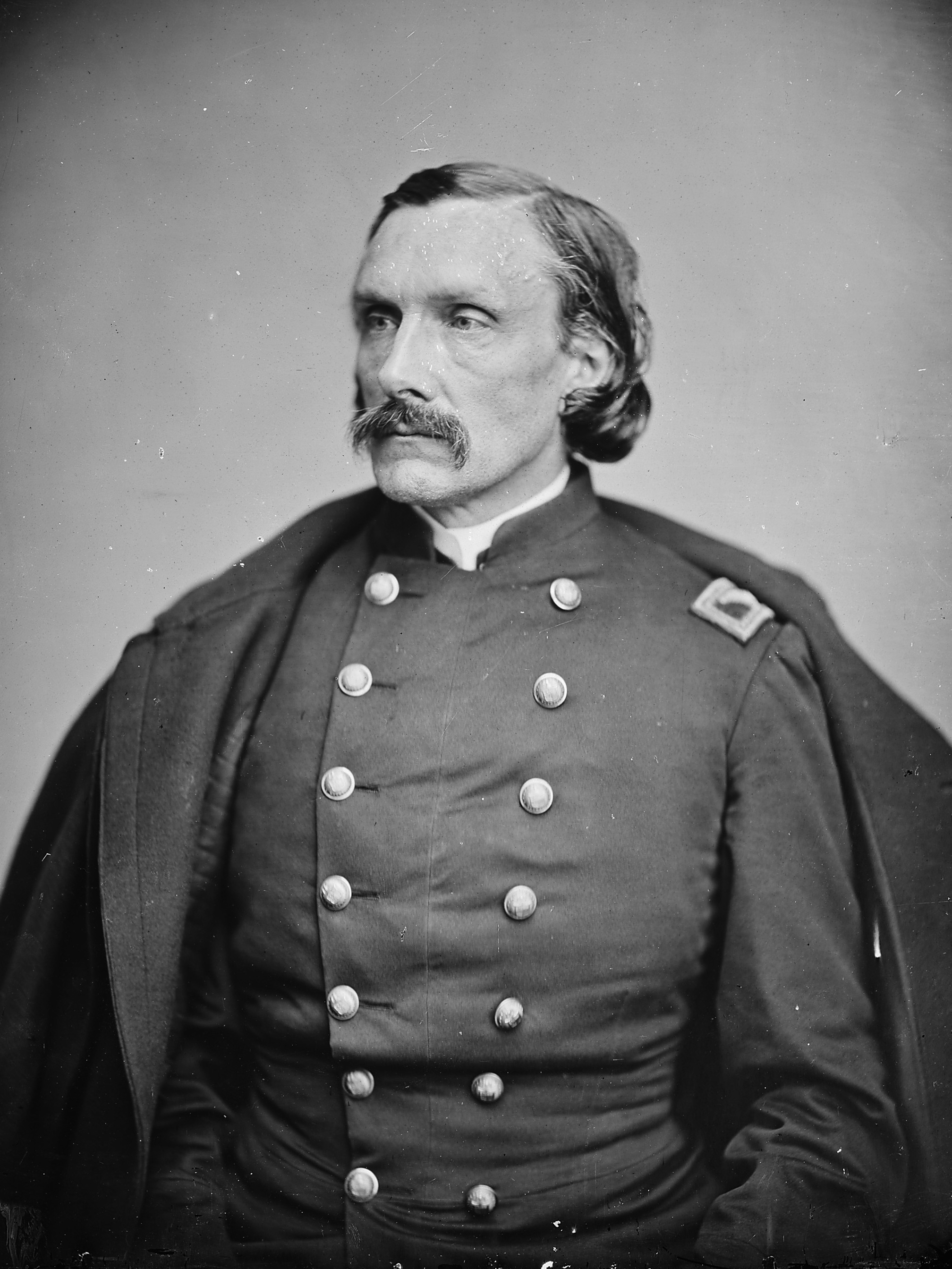
John O'Mahony was the primary founder and initial leader of the Fenian Brotherhood

After the collapse of the '48 rebellion James Stephens and John O'Mahony went to the Continent to avoid arrest. In Paris, they supported themselves by teaching and translation work and planned the next stage of "the fight to overthrow British rule in Ireland". In 1856 O'Mahony went to America and in 1858 founded the Fenian Brotherhood. Stephens returned to Ireland and in Dublin on St. Patrick's Day 1858, following an organising tour through the length and breadth of the country, founded the Irish counterpart of the American Fenians, the Irish Republican Brotherhood.

In 1863 the Brotherhood adopted a constitution and rules for general government. The First National Congress was organised in Chicago in November 1863. It allowed the organisation to be "reconstituted on the model of the institutions of the Republic, governing itself on the elective principle". Motions were passed to elect a Head Centre, with a Central Council of five elected members in 1863. This was extended to a Council of ten members at the second congress, held at Metropolitan Hall in Cincinnati, Ohio in January 1865, also with a President to be elected by the Council. This established a more distinctive republican style of governance with a Central Council or Senate and a Chief of the Senate, as well as a Presidential role with limited powers; O'Mahony was made President. Subsequently, this created a divided camp, as the Senate had powers to out-vote O'Mahony on future decisions.

== Fenian raids into Canada ==
Ten dollar Fenian bond

Twenty dollar Fenian bond

In the United States, O'Mahony's presidency over the Fenian Brotherhood was being increasingly challenged by William R. Roberts. Both Fenian factions raised money by the issue of bonds in the name of the "Irish Republic", which were bought by the faithful in the expectation of their being honoured when Ireland should be "A Nation Once Again". These bonds were to be redeemed "six months after the recognition of the independence of Ireland". Hundreds of thousands of Irish immigrants subscribed.

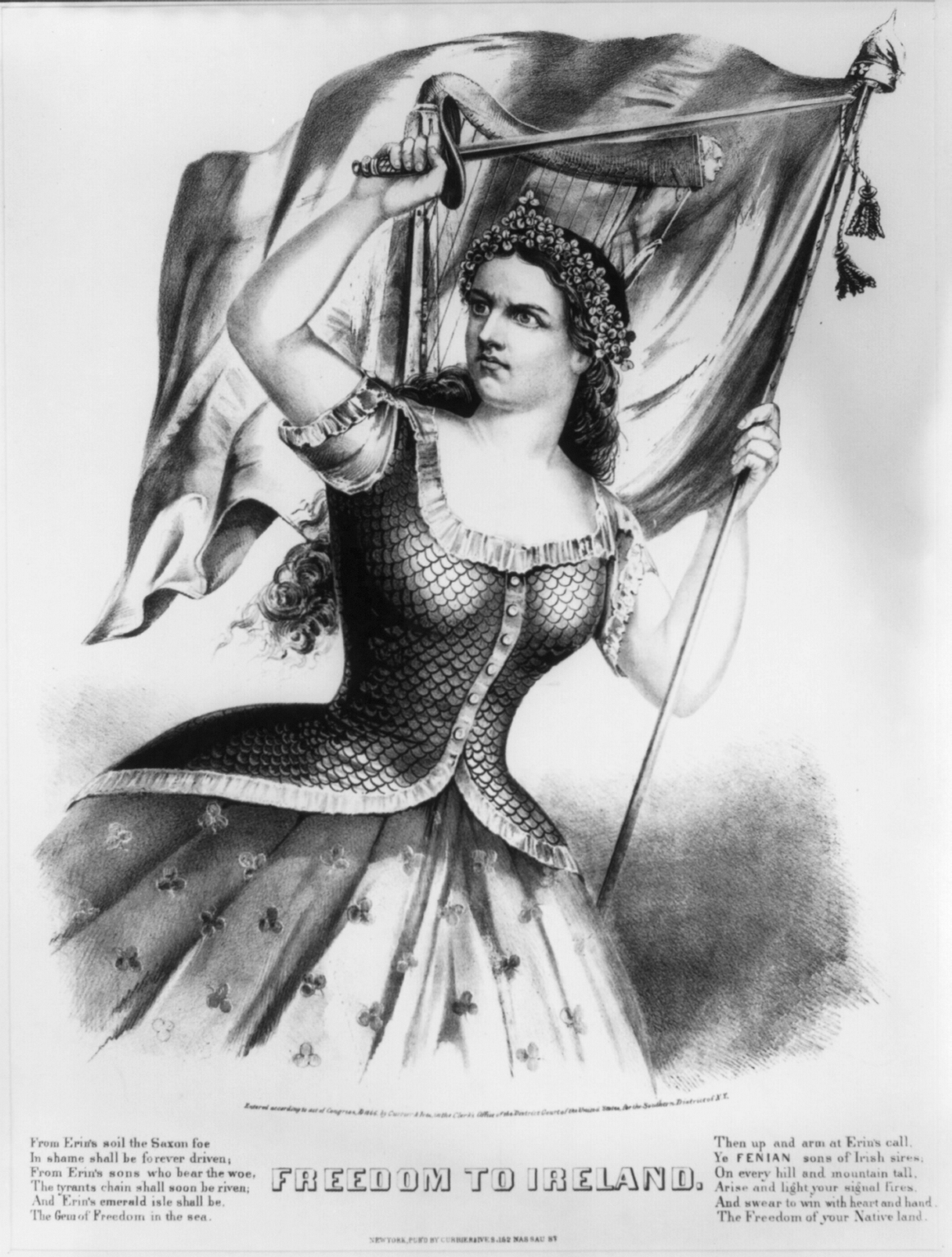
"Freedom to Ireland", a patriotic lithograph by Currier & Ives, New York, c. 1866

Large quantities of arms were purchased, and preparations were openly made by the Roberts faction for a coordinated series of raids into Canada, which the United States government took no major steps to prevent. Many in the US administration were not indisposed to the movement because of Britain's actions of what was construed as assisting the Confederacy during the American Civil War, such as CSS Alabama and blockade runners smuggling in weapons. Roberts' "Secretary for War" was General T. W. Sweeny, who was struck off the American army list from January 1866 to November 1866 to allow him to organise the raids. The purpose of these raids was to seize the transportation network of Canada, with the idea that this would force the British to exchange Ireland's freedom for possession of their Province of Canada. Before the invasion, the Fenians had received some intelligence from like-minded supporters within Canada but did not receive support from all Irish Catholics, as there those who saw the invasions as threatening the emerging Canadian sovereignty.

In April 1866, under the command of Bernard Doran Killian, a band of more than 700 members of the Fenian Brotherhood arrived at the Maine shore opposite Campobello Island with the intention of seizing it from the British. British warships from Halifax, Nova Scotia were quickly on the scene and the show of military force dispersed the Fenians. This action served to reinforce the idea of protection for New Brunswick by joining with the British North American colonies of Nova Scotia, Canada East, and Canada West in Confederation to form the Dominion of Canada.

The command of the expedition in Buffalo, New York, was entrusted by Roberts to Colonel John O'Neill, who crossed the Niagara River (the Niagara is the international border) at the head of at least 800 (O'Neill's figure; usually reported as up to 1,500 in Canadian sources) men on the night and morning of 31 May/1 June 1866, and briefly captured Fort Erie, defeating a Canadian force at Ridgeway. Many of these men, including O'Neill, were battle-hardened veterans of the American Civil War. In the end, the invasion had been broken by the US authorities' subsequent interruption of Fenian supply lines across the Niagara River and the arrests of Fenian reinforcements attempting to cross the river into Canada. It is unlikely that with such a small force they would have ever achieved their goal.

Other Fenian attempts to invade occurred throughout the next week in the St. Lawrence Valley. As many of the weapons had in the meantime been confiscated by the US army, relatively few of these men actually became involved in the fighting. There even was a small Fenian raid on a storage building that successfully got back some weapons that had been seized by the US Army. Many were eventually returned anyway by sympathetic officers.

To get the Fenians out of the area, both in the St. Lawrence and Buffalo, the U.S. government purchased rail tickets for the Fenians to return to their homes if the individuals involved would promise not to invade any more countries from the United States. Many of the arms were returned later if the person claiming them could post bond that they were not going to be used to invade Canada again, although some were possibly used in the raids that followed.

In December 1867, O'Neill became president of the Roberts faction of the Fenian Brotherhood, which in the following year held a great convention in Philadelphia attended by over 400 properly accredited delegates, while 6,000 Fenian soldiers, armed and in uniform, paraded the streets. At this convention, a second invasion of Canada was conceived. The news of the Clerkenwell explosion was a strong incentive to a vigorous policy. At the time, Henri Le Caron, a mole for British Intelligence, held the position of "Inspector-General of the Irish Republican Army". Le Caron later asserted that he distributed fifteen thousand stands of arms and almost three million rounds of ammunition in the care of the many trusted men stationed between Ogdensburg, New York and St. Albans, Vermont, in preparation for the intended raid. It took place in April 1870 and proved a failure just as rapid and complete as the attempt of 1866. The Fenians under O'Neill's command crossed the Canadian frontier near Franklin, Vermont, but were dispersed by a single volley from Canadian volunteers. O'Neill himself was promptly arrested by the United States authorities acting under the orders of President Ulysses S. Grant.

After resigning as president of the Fenian Brotherhood, John O'Neill unsuccessfully attempted an unsanctioned raid in 1871 and joined his remaining Fenian supporters with refugee veterans of the Red River Rebellion. The raiding party crossed the border into Manitoba at Pembina, Dakota Territory and took possession of the Hudson's Bay Company trading post on the Canada side. U.S. soldiers from the fort at Pembina, with permission of Canadian official Gilbert McMicken, crossed into Canada and arrested the Fenian raiders without resistance.

The Fenian threat prompted calls for Canadian confederation. Confederation had been in the works for years but was only implemented in 1867, the year following the first raids. In 1868, a Fenian sympathiser assassinated Irish-Canadian politician Thomas D'Arcy McGee in Ottawa, allegedly in response to his condemnation of the raids.

Fear of Fenian attack plagued the Lower Mainland of British Columbia during the 1880s, as the Fenian Brotherhood was active in both Washington and Oregon, but no raids ever materialized . At the inauguration of the mainline of the Canadian Pacific Railway in 1885, photos taken of the occasion show three large British warships sitting in the harbour just off the railhead and its docks. Their presence was explicitly because of the fear of Fenian invasion or terrorism, as were the large numbers of troops on the first train.

== 1867 and after ==
During the latter part of 1866 Stephens endeavoured to raise funds in America for a fresh rising planned for the following year. He issued a bombastic proclamation in America announcing an imminent general rising in Ireland; but he was himself soon afterwards deposed by his confederates, among whom dissension had broken out.

The Fenian Rising proved to be a "doomed rebellion", poorly organised and with minimal public support. Most of the Irish-American officers who landed at Cork, in the expectation of commanding an army against England, were imprisoned; sporadic disturbances around the country were easily suppressed by the police, army and local militias.

After the 1867 rising, IRB headquarters in Manchester opted to support neither of the dueling American factions, promoting instead a new organisation in America, Clan na Gael. The Fenian Brotherhood itself, however, continued to exist until voting to disband in 1880.

In 1881, the submarine Fenian Ram, designed by John Philip Holland for use against the British, was launched by the Delamater Iron Company in New York.

== See also ==
- Fenian
- Hunters' Lodges
- Catalpa rescue
- John Boyle O'Reilly
- Peter O'Neill Crowley

== Sources ==
- The IRB: The Irish Republican Brotherhood from The Land League to Sinn Féin, Owen McGee, Four Courts Press, 2005, ISBN 1-85182-972-5
- Fenian Fever: An Anglo-American Delemma, Leon Ó Broin, Chatto & Windus, London, 1971, ISBN 0-7011-1749-4.
- The McGarrity Papers, Sean Cronin, Anvil Books, Ireland, 1972
- Fenian Memories, Dr. Mark F. Ryan, Edited by T.F. O'Sullivan, M. H. Gill & Son, LTD, Dublin, 1945
- The Fenians, Michael Kenny, The National Museum of Ireland in association with Country House, Dublin, 1994, ISBN 0-946172-42-0

=== Bibliography ===
- Beiner, Guy. "Fenianism and the Martyrdom-Terrorism Nexus in Ireland before Independence" in Martyrdom and Terrorism: Pre-Modern to Contemporary Perspectives, edited by D. Janes and A. Houen (Oxford University Press, 2014), 199–220.
- Comerford, R. V. The Fenians in Context: Irish Politics and Society, 1848–82 (Wolfhound Press, 1985)
- D'Arcy, William. The Fenian Movement in the United States, 1858–86 (Catholic University of America Press, 1947)
- Jenkins, Brian. Fenians and Anglo-American Relations during Reconstruction (Cornell University Press, 1969).
- Jenkins, Brian, The Fenian Problem: Insurgency and Terrorism in a Liberal State, 1858–1874 (Montreal, McGill-Queen's University Press. 2008).
- Keogan, William L. Irish Nationalism and Anglo-American Naturalization: The Settlement of the Expatriation Question 1865–1872 (1982)
- Moody, T. W. (ed.) The Fenian Movement (Mercier Press, 1968)
- Eoin Neeson, Myths from Easter 1916, Aubane Historical Society, Cork, 2007, ISBN 978-1-903497-34-0
- O'Brien, William and Desmond Ryan (eds.) Devoy's Post Bag 2 Vols. (Fallon, 1948, 1953)
- O'Broin, Leon. Revolutionary Underground: The Story of the Irish Republican Brotherhood, 1858–1924 (Gill and Macmillan, 1976)
- Owen, David. The Year of the Fenians. Buffalo: Western New York Heritage Institute, 1990.
- Ryan, Desmond. The Fenian Chief: A Biography of James Stephens, Hely Thom LTD, Dublin, 1967
- Senior, Hereward. Canadian Battle Series No. 10: The Battles of Ridgeway and Fort Erie, 1866. Toronto: Balmuir Book Publishing, 1993.
- Vronsky, Peter. Ridgeway: The American Fenian Invasion and the 1866 Battle That Made Canada. Toronto: Alan Lane/Penguin Books, 2011.
- _____. The Fenians and Canada. Toronto: MacMillan, 1978.
- _____. The Last Invasion of Canada. Toronto and Oxford: Dundurn Press, 1991.
- Whelehan, Niall. The Dynamiters: Irish Nationalism and Political Violence in the Wider World, 1867–1900 Cambridge, 2012.
