= RMS Dakota (1873) =

19th century British passenger ship

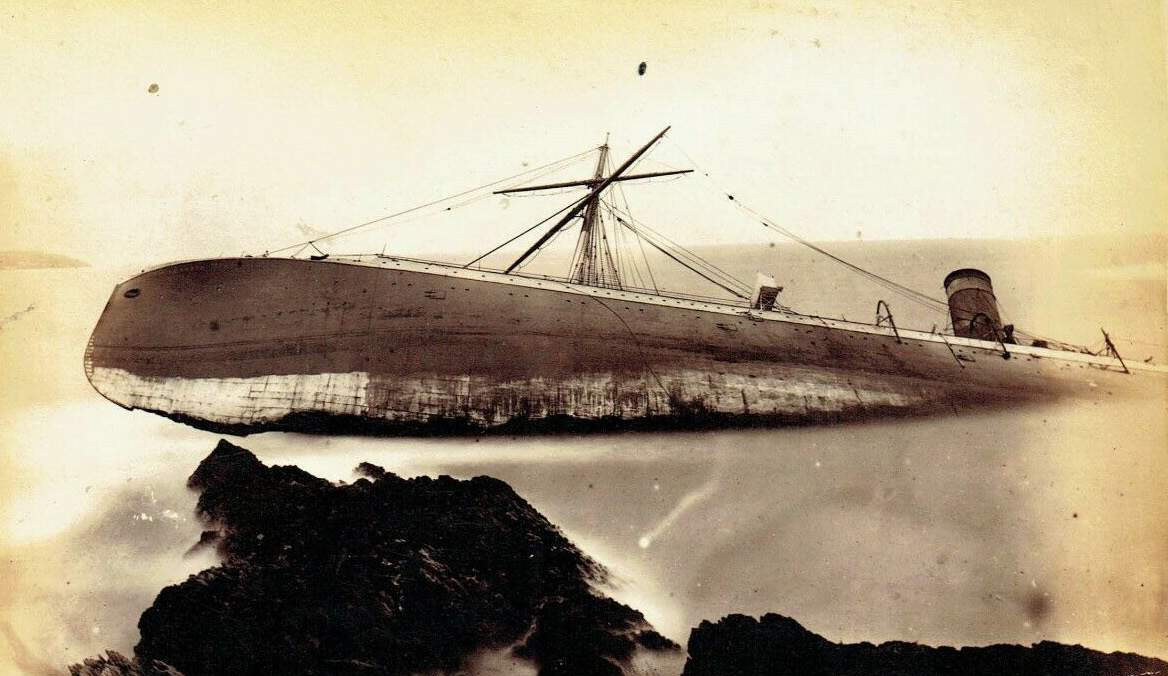
- Dakota ashore on East Mouse

History

United Kingdom
- Name: Dakota
- Owner: Guion Line
- Port of registry: Liverpool
- Builder: Palmers Shipbuilding and Iron Company, Jarrow
- Yard number: 282
- Laid down: 1870
- Launched: 12 June 1873
- Identification: UK official number 70883
- Fate: Wrecked off Anglesey, 10 May 1877
- Notes: Sister ship to the Montana

General characteristics
- Type: Ocean liner
- Tonnage: 4,332 GRT, 2,482 NRT
- Length: 412.0 ft (125.6 m)
- Beam: 43.4 ft (13.2 m)
- Depth: 32.7 ft (10.0 m)
- Installed power: 900NHP
- Propulsion: Single screw; 6 scotch boilers
- Sail plan: Brig
- Speed: 14 knots (26 km/h)

Dakota was a British passenger liner built for the Guion Line and ran the Liverpool-Queenstown-New York service.

== Background and Construction ==
Ordered in March 1870, the Montana and Dakota were constructed by Palmers Shipbuilding, who had launched the Wyoming of the same owners weeks prior.While popular for their steerage services, the Guion Line wanted to tap into the market of record breaking liners. As first designed, the Montana and Dakota were to carry ten water tube boilers working at a pressure of 100lbs per square inch. These were expected to drive the liners at a record-breaking 17 knot speed. While the Montana initially was completed with these, the Dakota was altered and completed with six traditional 80lbs boilers instead.

Another unusual feature of the two liners was their hull shape. While most liners had relatively flat bottoms and sides, the Dakota and her sister ship had a very large tumblehome, making her hurricane deck only 31.4 feet (9.57 metres) wide compared to the 43.4 feet (13.23 metres) width of the beam of the hull. This allowed for the liners to roll very little, causing minimal discomfort on board.

On the afternoon of 12 June 1873, the Dakota was successfully launched and entered her fitting out phase of construction.

== A Short Career ==
After years of delays and complications, the Dakota finally departed the River Mersey on her maiden voyage on 21 July 1875. She arrived in New York on 1 August after a slow 11 day crossing, not to much fanfare. She departed on her return voyage on the 10th, arriving back into Liverpool ten days later after a short stop in Queenstown.Her next voyage went practically without incident, aside an iceberg being spotted on 25 September while steaming Eastbound towards Queenstown. However, her next crossing she arrived in New York on 25 October carrying not only her own passengers, but also passengers from her sister ship. The Montana had suffered storm damage, and a mutiny aboard forced her to return to Queenstown, where her passengers could sail to New York on her sister ship instead.

While en route to New York again on 4 December 1875, she encountered a brig named Isabella Heldon in distress. The crew sent down a lifeboat to provide those on the brig with extra supplies, and a set of co-ordinates as the crew aboard the brig had lost their way.

Throughout 1876, the Dakota did not make any sailings for most of the year, despite her name still being mentioned in the company's fleets. She was possibly being refitted to carry refrigerated cargoes with her sister ship, as she is later recorded as carrying large quantities of frozen goods.Her first sailing of the year took place on 20 September 1876, arriving in New York on 2 October unharmed. Two crossings later marked the final sailing of the year for the Dakota, which she was beaten by rough weather. Her black and red funnel had turned white due to sea spray freezing, three of the eight lifeboats were smashed to pieces, and her jib was shredded to pieces. Despite the battered condition of the liner, nobody was injured throughout the crossing.

In January 1877, Dakota and Montana were officially designated as Royal Mail Ships. The following month, 13 February, the Dakota sailed from New York with the body of John O'Mahony on board for his funeral in Ireland.

The career of the Dakota would be cut short on 10 May the same year.

== Faults and Failures ==
Originally to be in service by 1874, the Dakota was significantly altered during her fitting out to avoid the same boiler troubles as her sister. On the delivery voyage of the Montana had suffered several fractures in her boilers. Rather than continue with the construction of the Dakota and encounter the same issue, the ten experimental boilers were replaced with six more traditional and lower pressure boilers. The machinery for the two liners was very unique and was expected to win the Blue Riband award for the Guion Line. However, the ships with their new machinery failed to break any records, and no ship for the company would until the SS Arizona broke the eastbound record in 1879.

As the Dakota entered service much later than originally intended, she was also significantly outclassed in size than when she was first ordered and laid down in 1870, falling just behind the Oceanic-class in size and immediately being outdone by the Germanic. The steamships also usually carried no more than 200 passengers at a time, significantly lower than the near 1,040 they were designed to hold.

On 25 Jan 1877, the Dakota was docked in Queenstown for seven hours, much longer than usual, due to the poor weather. She departed at 7:20pm carrying royal mail. During the same year on 7 March whilst she was departing the Mersey, the Dakota collided with a schooner named the Royalist, both vessels sustained minor damage but were able to continue on their crossings.

== Wrecking and Aftermath ==
On 9 May 1877, the Dakota left Liverpool for the last time on a routine voyage to New York. However, in the evening the liner made a navigational error and ran ashore off East Mouse, Anglesey. The following noon, the ship had broken in half. All passengers and crew were safely evacuated by local boats, as well as the Bull Bay Lifeboat of the National Lifeboat Institution.
