= 52nd Illinois Infantry Regiment =

52nd Regiment Illinois Volunteer Infantry
- Illinois state flag
- Active: November 19, 1861, to July 5, 1865
- Country: United States
- Allegiance: Union
- Branch: Infantry
- Engagements: Battle of Fort Donelson; Battle of Shiloh; Battle of Corinth; Battle of Resaca; Battle of Kennesaw Mountain; Siege of Atlanta; Battle of Jonesboro; March to the Sea; Battle of Bentonville

The 52nd Regiment Illinois Volunteer Infantry was an infantry regiment that served in the Union Army during the American Civil War.

== Service ==
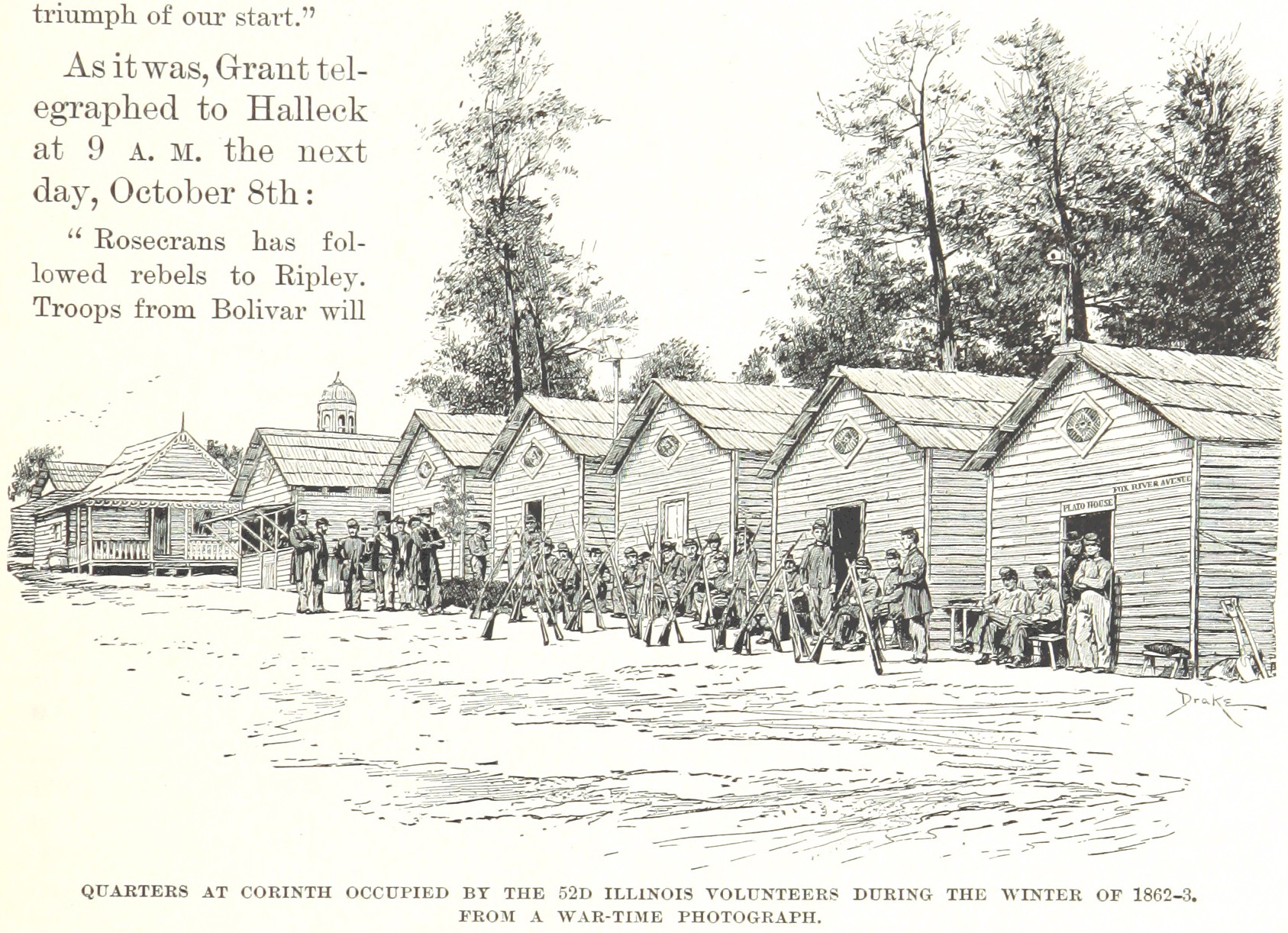
The 1862-63 winter quarters of the 52nd at Corinth, Mississippi

The 52nd Illinois Infantry was organized at Geneva, Illinois and mustered into Federal service on November 19, 1861.

The regiment was mustered out on July 5, 1865.

One soldier from the regiment, Sergeant Edward B. Spalding of Company E, was awarded the Medal of Honor for continuing to fight after being wounded at the Battle of Shiloh on April 6, 1862.

== Total strength and casualties ==
The regiment suffered 2 officers and 59 enlisted men who were killed in action or mortally wounded and 119 enlisted men who died of disease, for a total of 180 fatalities.

== Commanders ==
- Colonel Isaac G. Wilson - resigned on December 9, 1861.
- Colonel Thomas W. Sweeny - promoted brigadier general.
- Lieutenant Colonel Edwin A. Bowen - mustered out October 24, 1864.
- Lieutenant Colonel Jerome G. Davis - mustered out with the regiment.

== See also ==
- List of Illinois Civil War Units
- Illinois in the American Civil War
