= Emmet Monument Association =

- Founder: John O'Mahony; Michael Doheny
- Founded: February 1856
- Dissolved: c. 1858
- Succeeded by: Fenian Brotherhood
- Headquarters: New York City
- Ideology: Irish nationalism; Irish republicanism

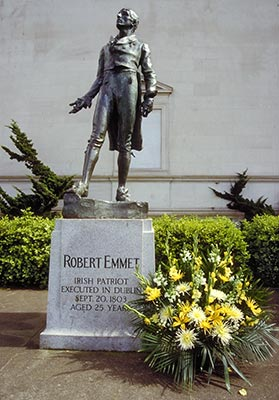
Statue of Robert Emmet

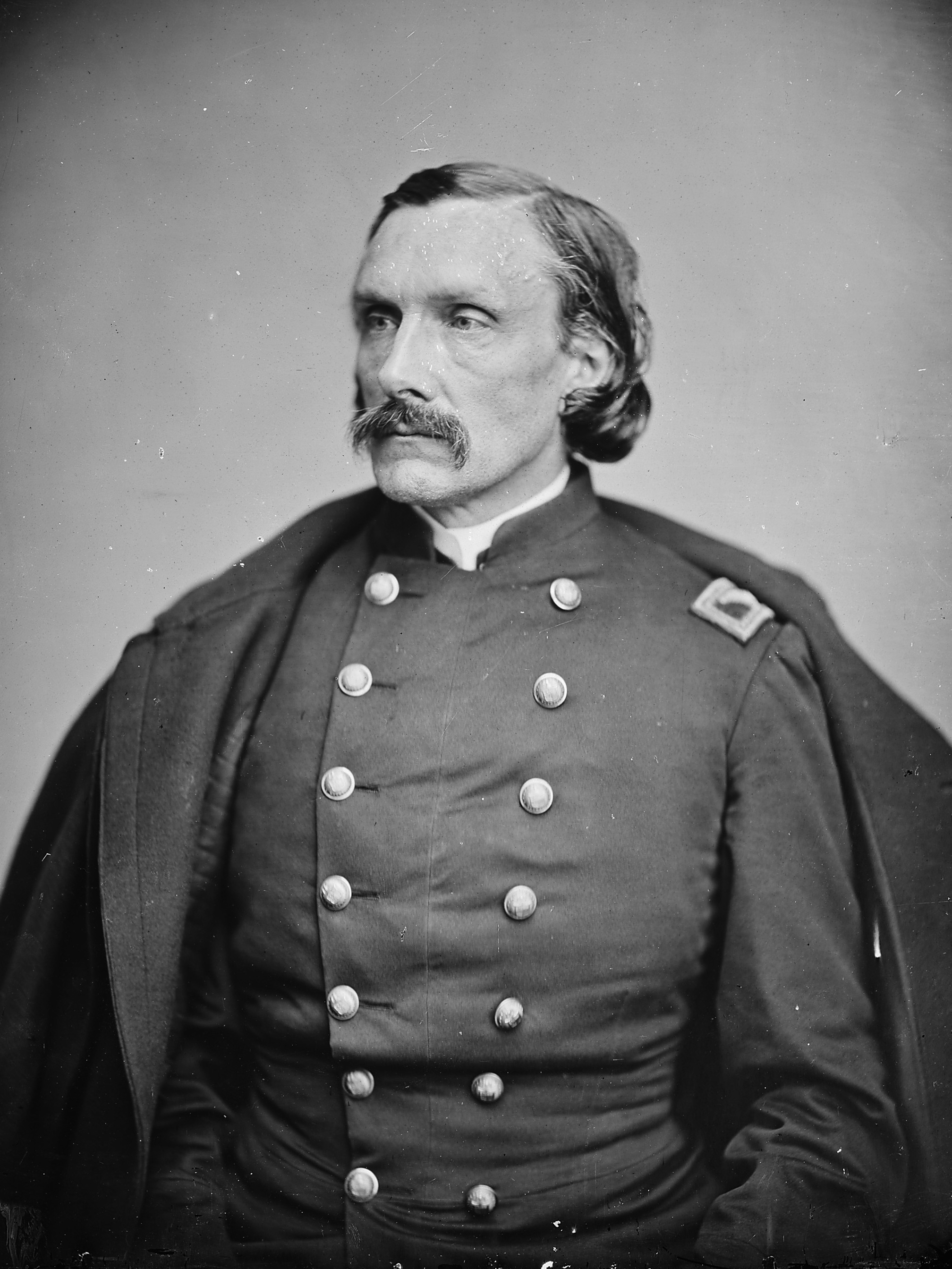
John O'Mahony

The Emmet Monument Association (EMA) was a mid-nineteenth-century secret military organization with the special purpose of training men to attack England and free Ireland. It was established in the mid-1850s, by John O'Mahony and Michael Doheny refugees from the Young Irelander Rebellion of 1848. According to tradition, no monument can be erected to Robert Emmet "until Ireland a nation can build him a tomb," therefore, the work of the Association presupposed the freedom of Ireland as a necessary preliminary.

== Background ==
Irish Nationalists towards the close of 1853 considered it to be a certainty of the United Kingdom becoming involved in a war with Russia, anticipating the Crimean War. This conviction would soon lead to the establishment of a new revolutionary society, which came to be known as the “Emmet Monument Association.” The Association was named after Robert Emmet, who was an Irish nationalist rebel leader, who led an abortive rebellion against British rule in 1803 and was captured, tried and executed. Emmet in closing his speech from the dock said:

Let no man write my epitaph; for as no man who knows my motives dare now vindicate them, let not prejudice or ignorance, asperse them. Let them and me rest in obscurity and peace, and my tomb remain uninscribed, and my memory in oblivion, until other times and other men can do justice to my character. When my country takes her place among the nations of the earth, then and not till then, let my epitaph be written. I have done.

The Association was founded by John O'Mahony and Michael Doheny in New York City in the United States. The Association spread quickly and soon numbered within its ranks the greater portion of the organized Irish Nationalists throughout the chief cities of the US. The leaders would enter into confidential relations with the representatives of Russia at Washington and New York.

== Russian aid ==
The representatives of the Association were apparently content that the Russians saw the expediency of Russia's aiding their project of creating a revolution in Ireland and thus striking at the British Empire in its most vital part. The Consul they believed held out to them the “strongest hopes” of their gaining from the Russian Government all the aid they required, which was namely, the means of fitting out an armed expedition for Ireland. The help promised by Russia never materialized until finally the Crimean war came to an unexpected close, ending all hopes of assistance from their new ally.

== Association dissolved ==
At this point it was deemed practical by the directors of the Association to formally dissolve and release the members from their pledges. Before this was done though, they took the precaution of first forming a permanent committee, consisting of thirteen men, representatives of the several divisions of the society. This committee was empowered to resuscitate the organization whenever they deemed the proper time had come for taking such a step.

After a period of two years, the “ever watchful patriots” who made up the committee came to the conclusion that the time had again arrived for renewing preparations for an Irish revolutionary movement. They accordingly summoned the members of the Association, and from its members proceeded in the formation of a new organization, which John O'Mahony named the Fenian Brotherhood.

== Irish Republican Brotherhood ==
It was Michael Doheny, John O'Mahony, Michael Corcoran, Owen Considine, Joseph Denieffe and others decided to send out feelers to Ireland to see if there was the chance a rebellion could be generated by the arrival of Irish American troops on Irish soil.

Joseph Denieffe contacted James Stephens, who agreed to prepare Irishmen in Ireland for a rebellion. Although in concept it was to be a united organization, Irish-America supplying trained military officers, money and weapons and Ireland supplying the foot soldiers for a rebellion.

In concept O'Mahony viewed the organization as a continuation of the Emmet Monument Association. But reality was that two distinct organizations grew out of the agreement: the Irish Republican Brotherhood (IRB) in Ireland founded by James Stephens and the Fenian Brotherhood (FB) founded by John O'Mahony in the United States.

== Sources ==
- A Personal Narrative of the Irish Revolutionary Brotherhood, Joseph Denieffe, The Gael Publishing Co., 1906
- Speeches from the Dock, T.D., A.M., and D.B. Sullivan, Re Edited by Seán Ua Cellaigh, M.H. Gill & Son, Dublin, 1953
