= Edward B. Spalding =

Edward Burson Spalding
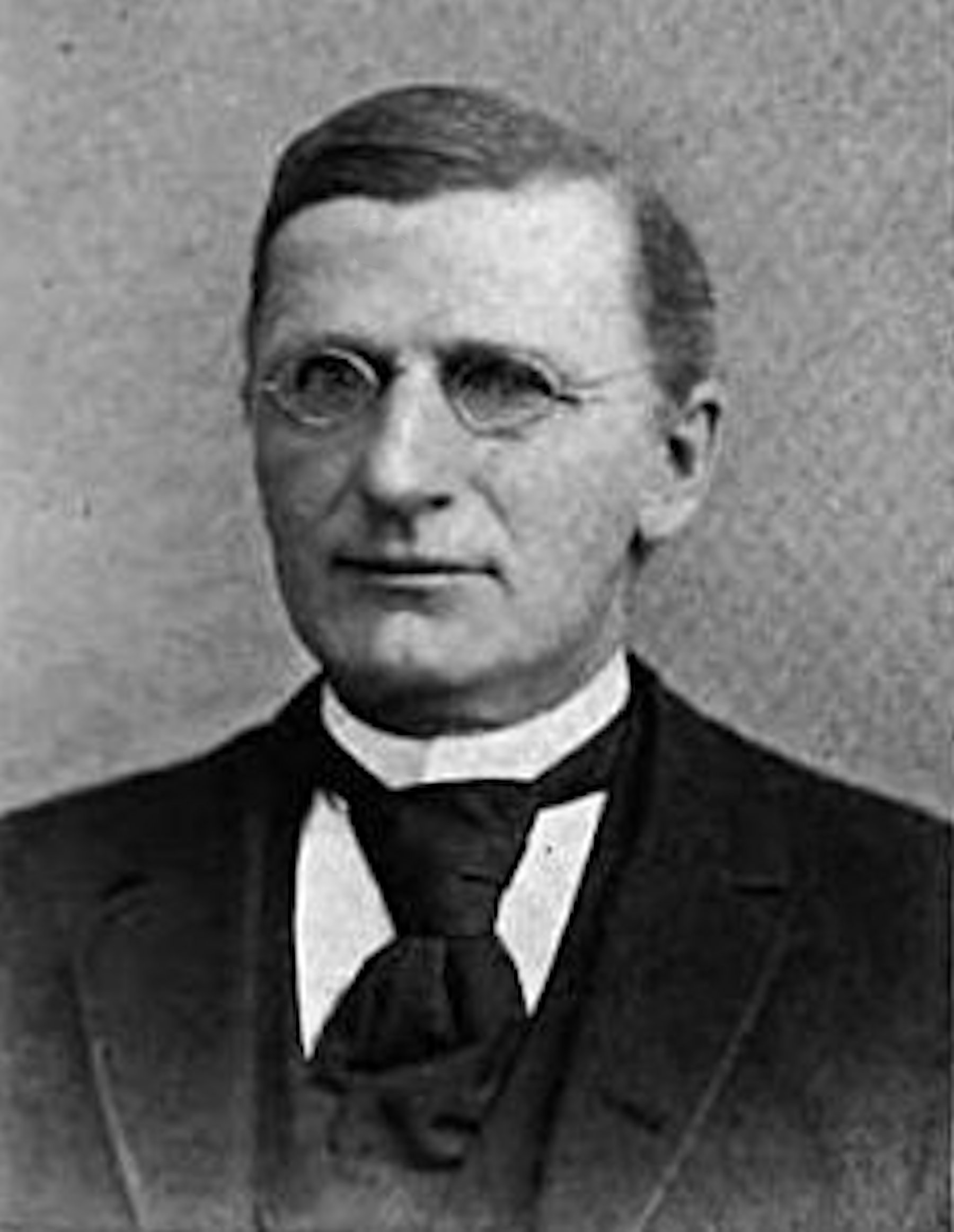
- Medal of Honor winner Edward Burson Spalding 1885
- Born: February 2, 1840; Byron, Illinois
- Died: March 4, 1920 (aged 80)
- Burial place: Floyd Cemetery, Sioux City, Iowa
- Military career
- Allegiance: United States
- Branch: United States Army
- Service years: 1861 - 1864
- Rank: First Lieutenant
- Unit: 52nd Illinois Volunteer Infantry Regiment
- Conflicts: American Civil War • Battle of Shiloh
- Awards: Medal of Honor

Edward Burson Spalding (February 2, 1840 – March 4, 1920) was a Union Army soldier in the American Civil War and a recipient of the United States military's highest decoration, the Medal of Honor, for his actions at the Battle of Shiloh.

== Biography ==
Born on February 2, 1840, in Byron, Illinois, Spalding joined the 52nd Illinois Infantry from Rockford in October 1861, and was mustered out December 1864. By April 6, 1862, he was serving as a sergeant in Company E of the 52nd Illinois Volunteer Infantry Regiment. On that day, at Pittsburg Landing, Tennessee, during the Battle of Shiloh, he was severely wounded but continued to fight for the remainder of the battle. For this action, he was awarded the Medal of Honor several decades later, on January 15, 1894.

Spalding's official Medal of Honor citation reads:

Although twice wounded, and thereby crippled for life, he remained fighting in open ground to the close of the battle.

Spalding died on March 4, 1920, at age 80 and was buried at Floyd Cemetery in Sioux City, Iowa.

== See also ==
- List of Medal of Honor recipients
