= Thomas William Sweeny =

Union Army officer in the American Civil War

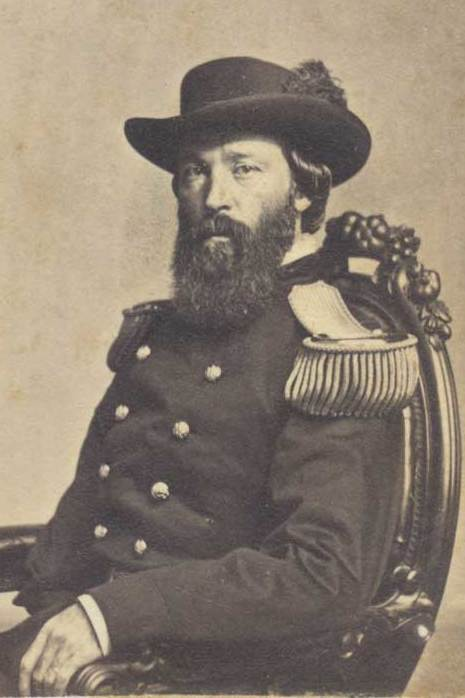
- Sweeny in his Brigadier general attire, c. 1865
- Born: December 25, 1820; Cork, Ireland
- Died: April 10, 1892 (aged 71); Long Island, New York, US
- Burial place: Green-Wood Cemetery, Brooklyn, New York
- Spouses: Eleanor Clark (m.1848 died 1860); Eugenia Reagan (m.1867)
- Military career
- Allegiance: United States of America; Union; Fenian Brotherhood
- Branch: United States Army; Union Army
- Service years: 1846–1865, 1866–1870
- Rank: Brigadier General
- Nickname: Fighting Tom
- Conflicts: Mexican–American War; Battle of Cerro Gordo (WIA); Battle of Churubusco (WIA); Yuma War; Battle of Fort Yuma; American Civil War; Battle of Wilson's Creek; Battle of Fort Donelson; Battle of Shiloh (WIA); Second Battle of Corinth; Atlanta campaign; Fenian raids
- Other work: Secretary of War

Thomas William Sweeny (December 25, 1820 – April 10, 1892) was an Irish-American soldier who served in the Mexican–American War, the Yuma War, and as a general in the Union Army during the American Civil War.

== Birth and early years ==
Sweeny was born in Cork, Ireland, on Christmas Day, 1820. He immigrated to the United States in 1833. In 1846, he enlisted as a second lieutenant in the 2nd New York Volunteers, and fought under General Winfield Scott in Mexico. Sweeny was wounded in the groin at the Battle of Cerro Gordo, and his right arm was so badly injured at the Battle of Churubusco that it had to be amputated. For his heroics, his fellow servicemen nicknamed him "Fighting Tom". Despite this usually career-ending injury, he continued serving with the 2nd US Infantry until the outbreak of the Civil War. Sweeny was active in the Yuma War (1850–1853), fighting in several engagements against native Americans.

== Civil War ==
At the outbreak of the Civil War, Sweeny was in command of the arsenal at St. Louis, Missouri. In reply to efforts of Confederate sympathizers to induce him to surrender that important post, he declared that before he would do so, he would blow it up. As second in command, he participated in the capture of Camp Jackson in May 1861 and later assisted in organizing the Home Guard. He was chosen as the brigadier general of that organization.

Sweeny commanded the 52nd Illinois Infantry Regiment at Fort Donelson. At Shiloh, in command of a brigade, he successfully defended a gap in the Union line. He was wounded in the battle, being shot twice in his only remaining arm and once in one of his legs. Sweeny kept the field until the close of the fight, exciting the admiration of the whole army.

"Certainly," said I; "Sweeny, go at once and occupy that ravine, converting it into a regular bastion." He did it, and I attach more importance to that event than to any of the hundred achievements which I have since heard "saved the day..." -Tecumseh Sheman

Music cover sheet dedicated to Sweeney created by John Daly in 1863.

He returned to command his regiment but returned to brigade command when General Pleasant A. Hackleman was killed at Corinth. He commanded the Second Division of the Sixteenth Army Corps in the Atlanta campaign. At the Battle of Atlanta Sweeny's division intercepted John B. Hood's flank attack. Sweeny got into a fistfight with his corps commander, General Grenville M. Dodge, when Dodge broke protocol and personally directed one of Sweeny's brigades during the fight. Sweeny received a court-martial for these actions but was acquitted. He mustered out of the volunteers in August 1865, and was dismissed for going AWOL by the end of the year.

== Fenian raids ==
In 1866, he commanded the ill-fated Fenian invasion of Canada, after which he was arrested for breaking neutrality laws between the United States and Britain, but was soon released. He was reinstated with his former rank of major later that year, and retired from the regular army in May 1870 as a brigadier general.

== Personal life ==
Sweeny married twice. He first married Eleanor “Ellen” Clarke in 1848, with whom he had four children. In 1867 he married Eugenia Reagan, having six children with her, the most prominent of which being William Montgomery Sweeny, a respected historian, genealogist and author who dedicated much of his adult life to preserving his father's memory, writing A Biographical Memoir of Thomas William Sweeny, Brigadier-General United States Army (published in 1907). He also published several works on American Revolutionary War history.

== Death ==
Sweeny retired to Astoria on Long Island. He died there on April 10, 1892, and is buried in Green-Wood Cemetery in Brooklyn.

== See also ==
- List of American Civil War generals (Union)
