= John O'Mahony =

Irish nationalist politician and Gaelic scholar (1815–1877)

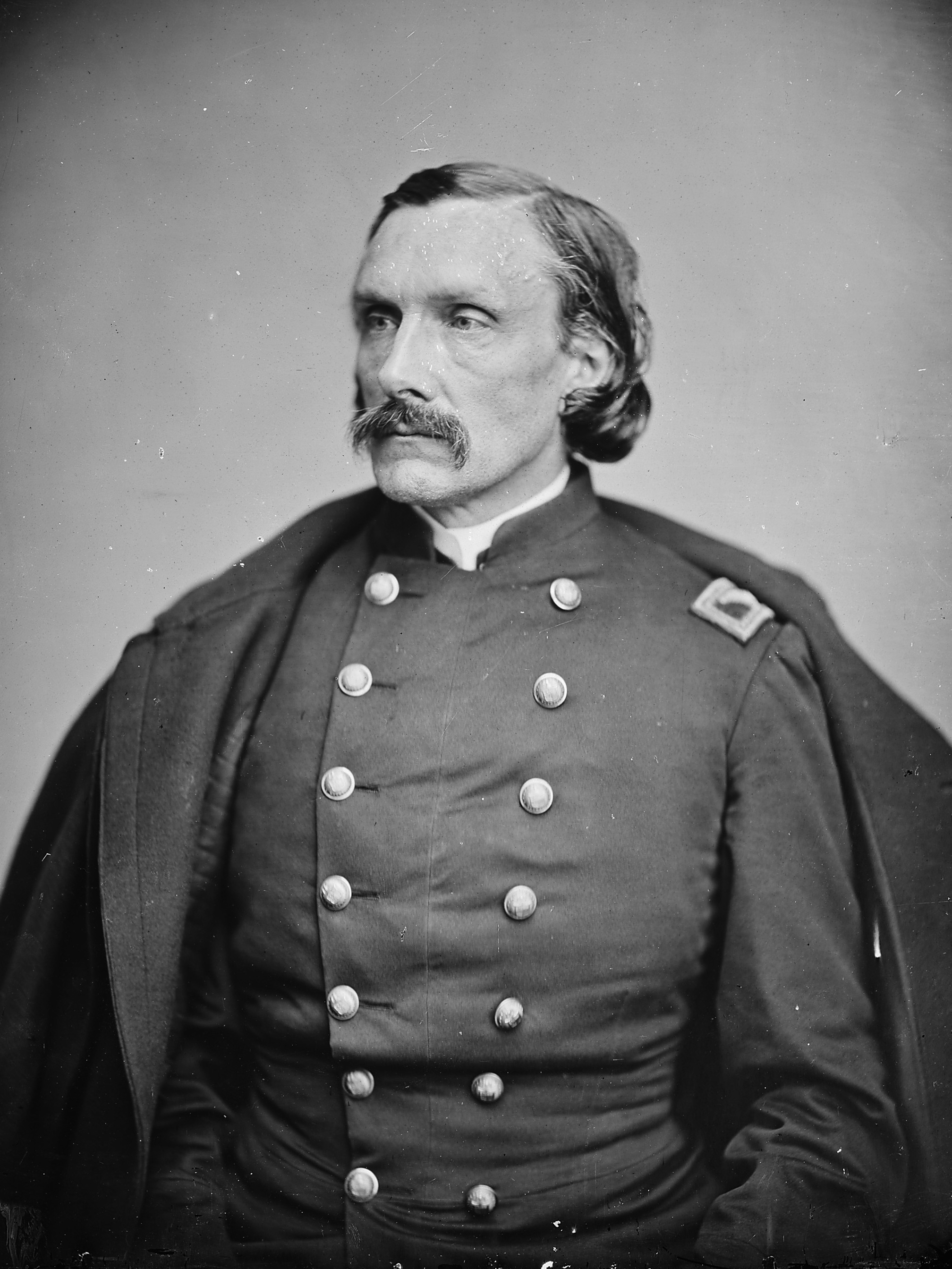
- O'Mahony, c. 1865, in the garb of an officer in the Union Army

Personal details
- Born: John Francis O'Mahony; 1815 Kilbeheny, on the border between County Limerick and County Cork, Ireland
- Died: 7 February 1877 (aged 61–62) New York City, United States
- Resting place: Glasnevin Cemetery, Dublin, Ireland
- Education: Trinity College, Dublin

Military service
- Allegiance: Union Army; Fenian Brotherhood
- Rank: Colonel
- Unit: 69th Infantry Regiment (New York)
- Battles/wars: Young Irelander Rebellion of 1848; American Civil War; Fenian Raids

John Francis O'Mahony (1815 – 7 February 1877) was an Irish scholar and the founding member of the Fenian Brotherhood in the United States, a sister organisation to the Irish Republican Brotherhood. Despite coming from a reasonably wealthy family and being well educated, the primary pursuit of O'Mahony's life was that of Irish Independence from the United Kingdom, a calling that ultimately left him in poverty. O'Mahony fought in the Young Irelander Rebellion of 1848 as well as the American Civil War, and was involved organisationally in the Fenian Rising of 1867 in Ireland and the Fenian Raids on Canada.

== Early life ==
O'Mahony was born in 1815 in Kilbeheny, on the border between County Limerick and County Cork, into a family of minor Roman Catholic landed gentry who had managed to retain land following the Munster Plantation. O'Mahony came from a long line of Irish activists: Members of the family had been outspoken advocates for the rights of the native Irish during the Penal Laws period of the late 17th and early 18th centuries, while his father and uncle had been members of the United Irishmen and had taken part in the Irish Rebellion of 1798.

Upon the death of an elder brother, O'Mahony inherited a property that yielded £300 per annum. However, he would later yield this inheritance to his sister in order to pursue his Fenian activities.

=== Education ===
O'Mahony was educated at Midleton College by Dr Hamblin. Despite being a Catholic, he later entered Trinity College, Dublin (nominally Catholics were forbidden from entering Trinity due to its ties to the Protestant Church of Ireland), where he studied Sanskrit, Hebrew and Irish. He became an accomplished Gaelic scholar, and later taught Greek and Latin, and contributed articles to Irish and French journals. He left Trinity without getting a degree.

== Irish politics ==
In 1843, he joined Daniel O'Connell's movement for the Repeal of the Union Act of 1800, but quickly became dissatisfied with the lack of progress and joined Young Irelander movement, led by Smith O'Brien. The Young Ireland movement had come to believe that in the wake of the failure of the Repeal Association, violence was the only alternative.

O'Mahony took part in the failed Young Irelander Rebellion of 1848, which largely fell apart as British authorities had become well aware of it before it commenced. Following the crushing of the uprising, the leaders were sought out, and O'Mahony being amongst them, he was forced to go on the run. Following the arrest of John Mitchell, many Young Irelanders took to the hills, continuing to fight guerrilla style. O'Mahony and his band of volunteers were some of the last holdouts. However, following the capture of leaders such as Smith O'Brien, Thomas Francis Meagher, James Stephens and Terence Bellew MacManus, it became apparent the effort was doomed.

== Emigration ==
His participation in the rebellion obligated him to leave Ireland, and he settled for a time in Paris, where he lived in great poverty. In 1854, he learned that John Mitchel had escaped from the penal colony on Van Dieman's Land and made his way to New York City. O'Mahony managed to follow him there and thereafter took part in the Emigrant Aid Association, the Emmet Monument Association, and other Irish organisations.

== History of Ireland ==
In 1857, he published History of Ireland, by Geoffrey Keating, D. D., translated from the Original Gaelic, and Copiously Annotated (New York, 1857). Dr. Todd, in his preface to the Wars of the Gaedhill with the Gaell, says, "His translation of Keating is a great improvement upon the ignorant and dishonest one published by Mr. Dermod O'Connor more than a century ago, but has been taken from a very imperfect text, and has evidently been executed, as he himself confesses, in great haste." O'Mahony's notes are copied from O'Donovan's Four Masters, and it was on this ground that Hodges & Smith procured an injunction against the sale of the book in the United Kingdom. The mental strain to which O'Mahony was subjected in the preparation of this work, which brought him no pecuniary gain, affected his reason, and he was removed by his friends for a short time to a lunatic asylum.

== Fenian Brotherhood ==
In 1855, O'Mahony, alongside the likes of Thomas J. Kelly and Michael Corcoran organised the Fenian Brotherhood in the U.S., closely associated with the newly founded Irish Republican Brotherhood in Ireland. The object of the association was to secure the separation of Ireland. The name was probably derived the Fenian Cycle, a body of medieval Gaelic poems about a mythical pre-Christian Irish army. The early portion of Geoffrey Keating's History is occupied with the exploits of the ancient Fenians. The organisation of the new society was completed at conventions that were held in Chicago in 1864, and in Cincinnati in January 1865.

== American Civil War ==
At the time of the Cincinnati convention, O'Mahony held the rank of colonel of the 69th Regiment of New York State Militia, recruited mainly from the ranks of the Brotherhood, which had also furnished a large proportion of Meagher's Irish Brigade, the Corcoran Legion, and Irish regiments engaged in the American Civil War. The rapid growth in membership of the Fenian Brotherhood rendered it impossible for O'Mahony to retain the colonelcy of the 69th regiment, which he had held for some time, and resigning he gave all his attention to the spread of Fenianism.

== Fenian growth ==
The close of the Civil War in the spring of 1865 gave a great impetus to the Fenians, owing to the number of Irish-American soldiers that were disbanded and anxious to see service elsewhere. Money poured into the Fenian exchequer; probably $500,000 was subscribed between 1860 and 1867. Many differences occurred between O'Mahony and James Stephens and the Central Council relative to the policy to be pursued for the attainment of their object, but O'Mahony remained president of the organisation for several years. He did not take any part personally in the attempted Fenian Rising of 1867 or in the raids on Canada, although his advice counted for much in these enterprises.

In New York, O'Mahony and his paper the Irish People was challenged by the IRB exile David Bell and his paper the Irish Republic. Bell, a committed supporter of the Radical Republican agenda of black franchise and Reconstruction, repeatedly criticized O'Mahony's branch of the Fenian Brotherhood, dubbing it the "bloated carcass of gaseous Manhattanism." He argued that O'Mahony was indifferent to the need to "cleanse" the spirits of the Irish in America: "Let our people fling off the scales of bigotry and declare that all men are entitled to 'life, liberty, and happiness.'"

== Later years ==
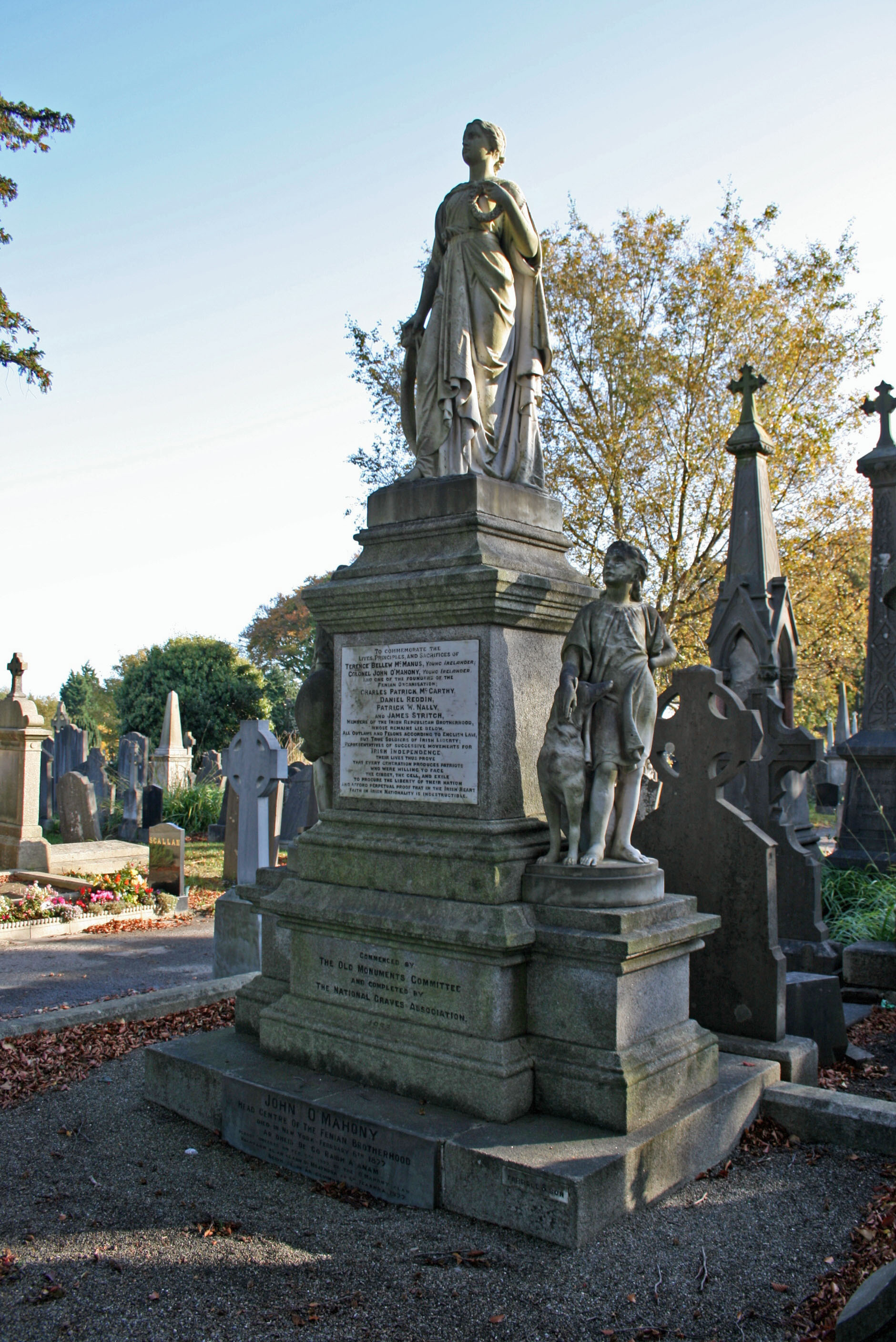
Grave of John O'Mahony in the Fenian Plot, Glasnevin, Dublin

He devoted the last years of his life to literary pursuits, but suffered from ill health struggled to secure the bare means for subsistence. When his poverty was discovered, he declined to receive assistance. He died in New York City in 1877 and his remains were taken to Ireland aboard the Dakota and interred with the honors of a public funeral in Glasnevin Cemetery in Dublin.

== Posthumous legacy ==
Given his links with Irish republicanism and the GAA a club in Dundalk was named after him called Sean O'Mahony's GFC. They play in black and amber and in men's and ladies teams. Apparently the source of the club's name has caused some controversy but its actual source is the first Principal of the Old Point Road Primary School, across the road from the present pitch. (Sourced by members of the Principal's family).
