= Chronology of the Great Famine =

Famine in Ireland from 1845 to 1852

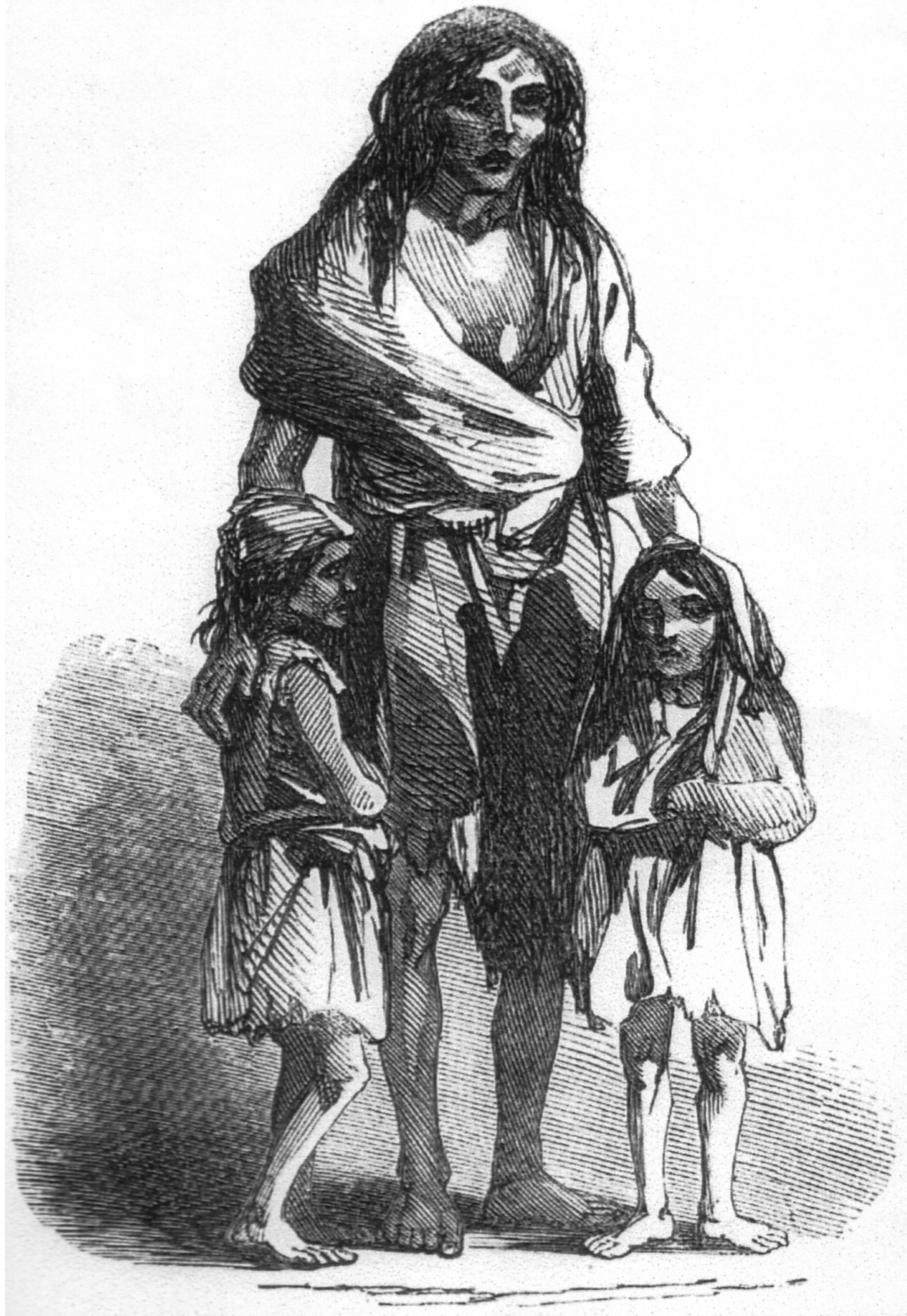
An 1849 depiction of Bridget O'Donnell and her two children during the famine.

The chronology of the Great Famine (Irish: An Gorta Mór or An Drochshaol, lit. 'The Bad Life') documents a period of Irish history between 29 November 1845 and 1852 during which time the population of Ireland was reduced by 20 to 25 percent. The proximate cause was famine resulting from a potato disease commonly known as late blight. Although blight ravaged potato crops throughout Europe during the 1840s, the impact and human cost in Ireland – where a third of the population was entirely dependent on the potato for food but which also produced an abundance of other food – was exacerbated by a host of political, social and economic factors which remain the subject of historical debate.

== Chronology ==
=== 1843 ===
Potato blight was reported around the ports of New York and Philadelphia.

=== 1844 ===
The Belgian Government, in an attempt to solve a problem with curl and dry rot, imported seed potatoes from the United States, and had them planted at Cureghem, Anderlecht in the west of Flanders. The crop was reported as diseased. In, June 1844, Belgian botanist and mycologist, Desmazières, spotted the blight in Frances's, adjacent department Nord, with crop losses around Lille reported as significant. The first recorded evidence that the blight which had ravaged the potato crop in North America in 1843, had crossed the Atlantic.

=== 1845 ===
==== August ====
At the beginning of August, a potato disease was reported, across the Channel, close to the port of Folkestone, Kent, southern England. Charles Darwin, then resident at Down House, wrote to his former mentor, at Cambridge University, John Stevens Henslow on the appearance.

==== September ====
On 13 September 1845 potato blight was first reported in Ireland. The crops at Dublin were suddenly perishing. It was reported in the Gardeners' Chronicle, asking "where will Ireland be in the event of a universal potato rot?" The British Government were nevertheless optimistic through the next few weeks.

==== October ====
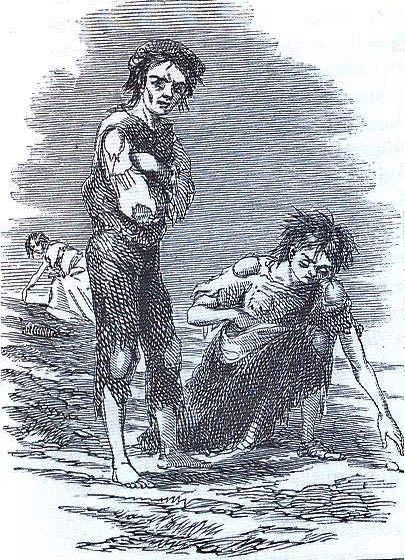
Skibbereen 1847 by Cork artist James Mahony (1810–1879), commissioned by the Illustrated London News

- As soon as digging of potato crops began, devastating reports started coming in. Sir Robert Peel found the accounts 'very alarming' and writing to Sir James Graham, the Home Secretary on 13 October reminded him that there was always a tendency in Irish news to exaggerate. Constabulary Reports from the 15 reported great failures, Sir James Graham, the Home Secretary wrote that the truth about the potato crop, until digging was completed, could not be fully ascertained.
- The Prime Minister Robert Peel was prompted to act, and on 15 October he decided to summon an emergency meeting of his Cabinet for 31 October. The remedy he decided was to repeal the Corn Laws. Peel then decided to set up a Scientific Commission to go to Ireland and investigate the potato blight and report on conditions.
- The emergency Cabinet meeting met on 31 October till 1 November. The first day consisted of reading reports and memoranda from Ireland on the potato failure. Peel proposed that a relief commission be established in Ireland, and a sum of money be advanced to the Lord -Lieutenant. Differences arose when Peel pointed out that these measures required an advance of public money. The purchase of food for destitute districts would open the question of Corn Laws. Was it possible, it was asked, to vote public money for the sustenance of a people on account of "actual or apprehended scarcity" and still maintain restrictions on the free import of grain; Peel declared it was not. On this issue then the Cabinet split, the overwhelming majority voting against Peel. Unable to reach a decision, the Cabinet adjourned till 6 November.

The principle of the Corn Laws had been to keep the price of home-grown grain up. Duties on imported grain assured English farmers a minimum and profitable price. The burden of a higher price for bread was carried by the labouring classes, in particular factory workers and operatives. It was claimed that if the Corn Laws were repealed all those connected with the land would be ruined and the established social organisation of the country destroyed.

According to Cecil Woodham-Smith, the rising wrath of Tories and landlords ensured "all interest in Ireland was submerged." She writes that the Tory Mayor of Liverpool refused to call a meeting for the relief of Irish distress. She continues that the Mansion House Committee in Dublin was accused of 'deluding the public with a false alarm', and the blight itself 'was represented as the invention of agitators on the other side of the water'. The entanglement of the Irish famine with the repeal of the Corn Laws, she says, was a key misfortune for Ireland. The potato failure was eclipsed by the domestic issue of Corn Law repeal. The Irish famine, she writes, "slipped into the background."

==== November ====
- On 10 November Peel ordered the secret purchase of £100,000 worth of Indian corn and meal from America for distribution in Ireland.
- On 15 November the Scientific Commissioners reported that half the potato crop had been destroyed.
- On 19 November the Mansion House Committee in Dublin claimed to have "ascertained beyond the shadow of doubt that considerably more than one-third of the entire potato crop...has been already destroyed."
- On 20 November the Relief Commission first met.
- Unable to persuade his Cabinet to repeal the Corn Laws, on 5 December Peel tendered his resignation to Queen Victoria but was reinstated days later when Lord John Russell was unable to form a government.

=== 1846 ===
The first deaths from hunger took place in early 1846. In March Peel set up a programme of public works in Ireland but was forced to resign as Prime Minister on 29 June. The new Whig administration under Lord John Russell, influenced by their laissez-faire belief that the market would provide the food needed then halted government food and relief works, leaving many hundreds of thousands of people without any work, money or food. Grain continued to be exported from the country. Private initiatives such as The Central Relief Committee of the Society of Friends (Quakers) attempted to fill the gap caused by the end of government relief and eventually the government reinstated the relief works, although bureaucracy slowed the release of food supplies. The blight almost totally destroyed the 1846 crop and the Famine worsened considerably. By December a third of a million destitute people were employed in public works.

=== 1847 ===
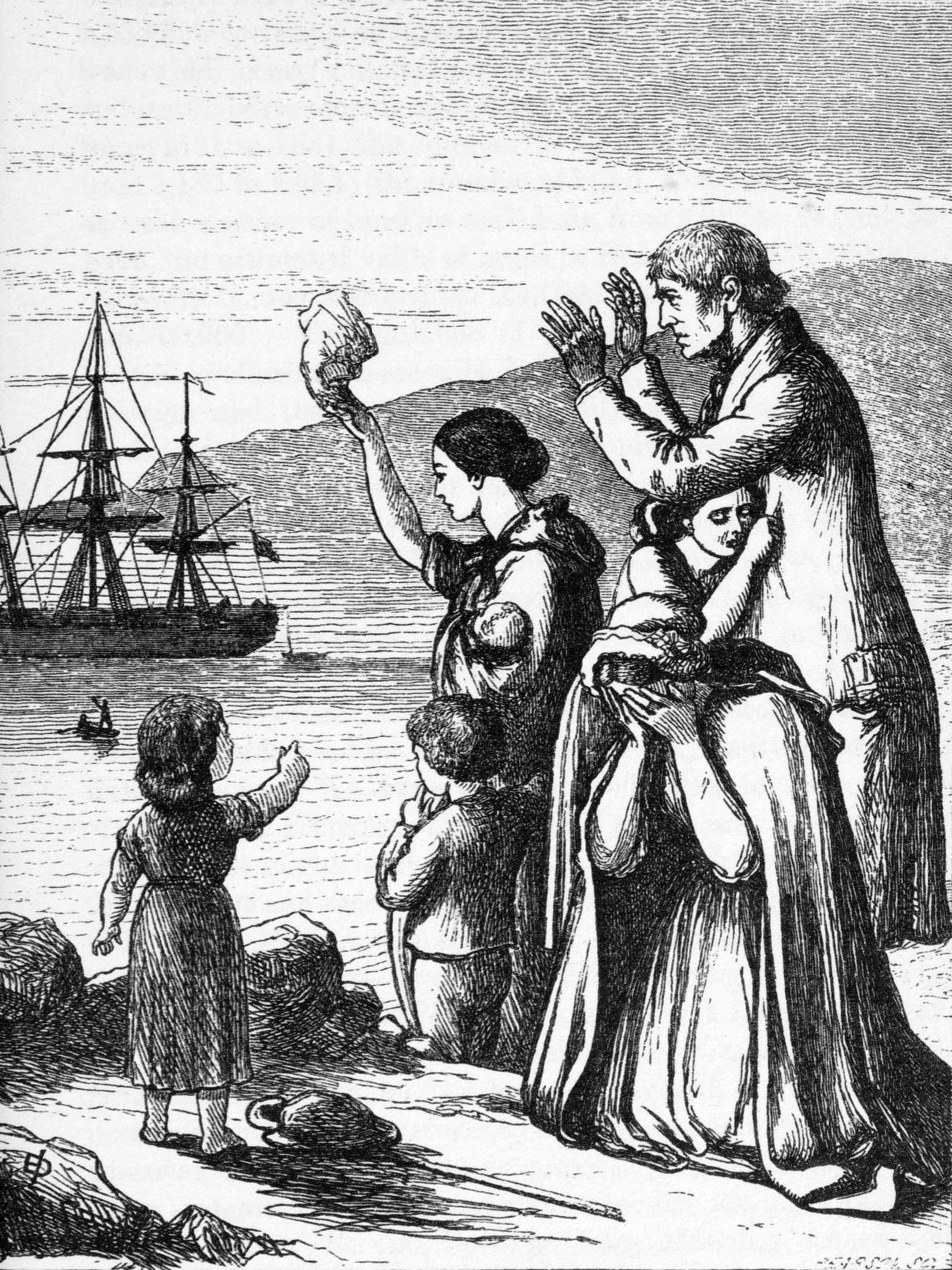
Emigrants Leave Ireland, engraving by Henry Doyle (1827–1892), from Mary Frances Cusack's Illustrated History of Ireland, 1868

There were average crop yields in the 1847 harvest, but due to lack of seed potatoes to plant, the crop was low. Crowds began to throng the public works during the last months of 1846 and the start of 1847, which promoted exactly the social conditions for the spread of 'famine fever.' In late January and February, legislation called the Temporary Relief Act went through the British parliament; it became popularly known as the Soup Kitchen Act and occasionally as Burgoyne's Act. This system of relief was designed to deliver cheap food directly and gratuitously to the destitute masses. This system of relief would be terminated in September. The government also announced an additional change in the system of relief. After August 1847, the permanent Poor Law was to be extended and was to become responsible for providing relief and as a result, all relief would be financed by the local Poor Law rates. This put impossible loads on local poor rates, particularly in the rural west and south. With the mass emigration of the famine era, the horrors of the 'coffin ships' and 1847 have ever since been associated in the popular mind, according to James S. Donnelly.

In December 1847 The Crime and Outrage Bill (Ireland) 1847 was enacted due to growing Irish nationalist agitation that was causing the British government concern about a possible violent rebellion against British rule in Ireland. The bill gave the Lord Lieutenant of Ireland the power to organise the island into districts and bring police forces into them at the districts' expense. It limited who could own guns, and required all of the men in the district between the ages of 16 and 60 to assist in apprehending suspected murderers when landlords were killed, or else be guilty of a misdemeanour themselves.

=== 1848 ===
The blight returned in 1848 and outbreaks of cholera were reported. Evictions became common among the 1.5 million households of agricultural labourers and tenant farmers who could not pay their rent. Famine victims on outdoor relief peaked in July at almost 840,000 people. On 29 July an uprising against the government was led by William Smith O'Brien. After a skirmish at "Widow McCormack's house" in the village of Ballingarry, County Tipperary the leaders of the rebellion fled to America or were sentenced to transportation.

=== 1849 ===
The potato crop failed again in 1849 and famine was accompanied by cholera outbreaks. This deadly cholera epidemic killed one of Ireland's greatest poets: James Clarence Mangan.

=== 1850 ===
The Famine ended.

=== 1851 ===
By 1851 census figures showed that the population of Ireland had fallen to 6,575,000 – a drop of 1,600,000 in ten years. Cormac Ó Gráda and Joel Mokyr have described the 1851 census as a famous but flawed source. They contend that the combination of institutional and individuals figures gives "an incomplete and biased count" of fatalities during the famine. The famine left in its wake up to a million dead and another million emigrated. The famine caused a sense of lasting bitterness by the Irish towards the British government, whom many blamed – then and now – for the starvation of so many people. The fall-out of the famine continued for decades afterwards.

== See also ==
- European Potato Failure (the wider agrarian crisis in Europe at the same time)
- "The Fields of Athenry," a popular song about the famine
- Highland Potato Famine (1846–57) (agrarian crisis in Scotland at the same time)
- Holodomor, a 1930s famine in Ukraine, the causes of which are also the subject of debate
- Irish Famine (1740–1741)
- Irish Famine (1879)
- Legacy of the Great Irish Famine (continuation of this article)
- List of famines
- List of natural disasters in Ireland
