= Patrick O'Donoghue (Young Irelander) =

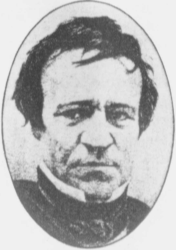
Patrick O'Donoghue

Patrick O'Donoghue (1810–1854), also known as Patrick O'Donohoe or O'Donoghoe, from Clonegal, County Carlow, was an Irish Nationalist revolutionary and journalist, a member of the Young Ireland movement.

== Early life ==
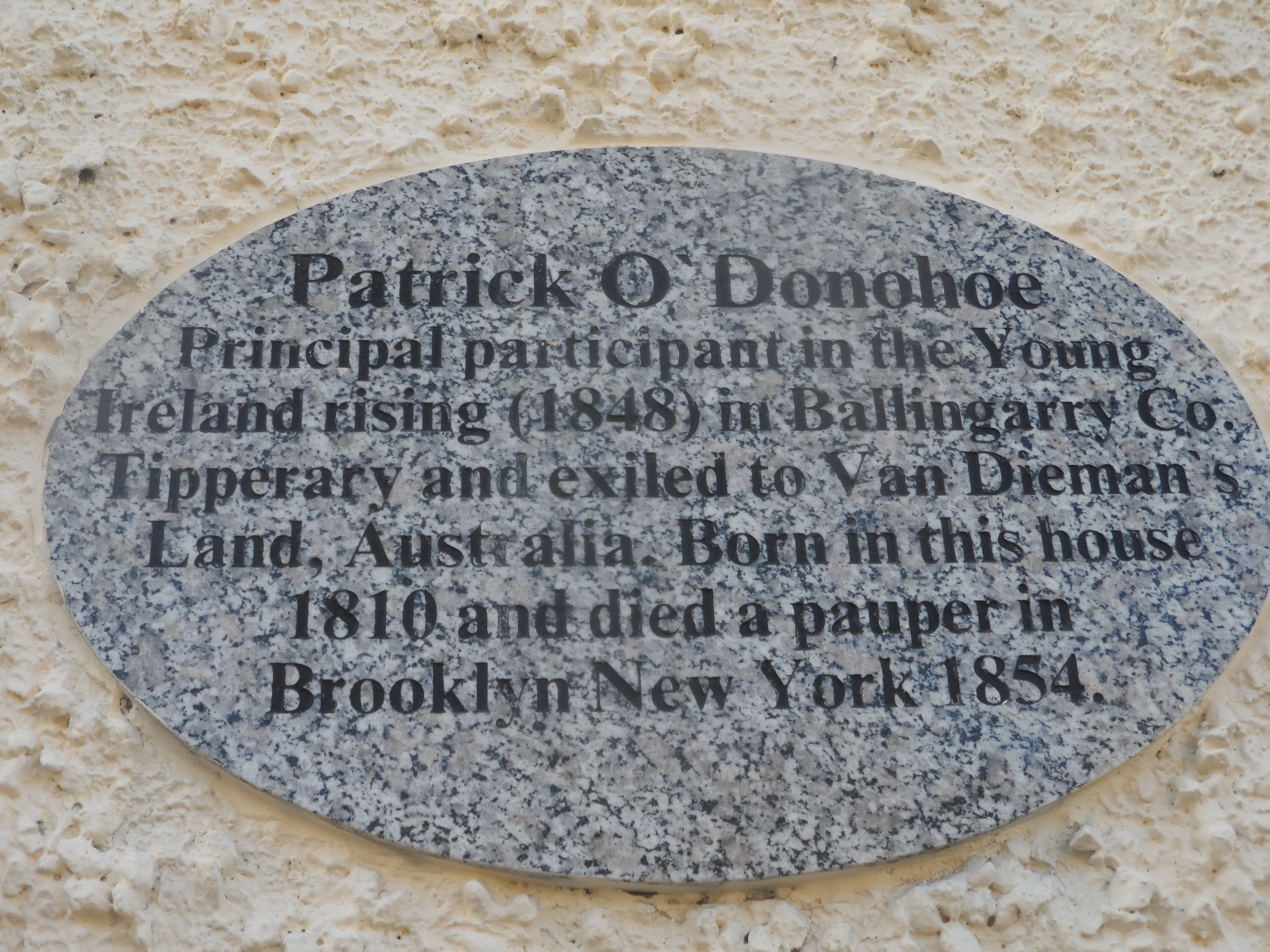
Plaque on O'Donohoe's birthplace, Clonegal.

Born to a peasant family in County Carlow, O'Donoghue was self educated. He managed to gain a place at Trinity College Dublin. He worked as a Law Clerk in Dublin.

== Young Irelander Rebellion ==
In the aftermath of the failed Young Irelander Rebellion at Ballingarry, County Tipperary, in July 1848, he was placed in October 1848 before a British 'Special Commission' at Clonmel in County Tipperary and sentenced to death for treason. As with other prominent Young Irelanders, this was later commuted to transportation for life to the penal colony at Van Diemen's Land (Tasmania).

== Transportation to Van Diemen's Land ==
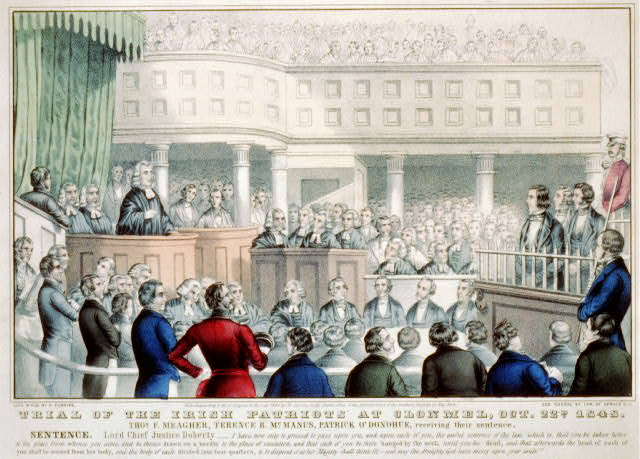
Trial of the Irish patriots at Clonmel. Thomas Francis Meagher, Terence MacManus, and Patrick O'Donoghue receiving their sentence of death.

In 1849 O'Donoghue, together with William Smith O'Brien, Terence MacManus, Thomas Francis Meagher and many others were on board the prisoner transport ship the Swift for a six-month, 14,000-mile journey under difficult conditions which some fellow prisoners did not survive.

On 26 January 1850, "Using materials he had begged and borrowed" as one account gives it, Patrick O'Donoghue started publishing in Hobart Town a weekly newspaper named The Irish Exile, aimed mainly at fellow Irish prisoners and deportees and considered to be the first Irish Nationalist paper to be published in Australia.

The paper featured Irish ballads and poetry, articles about Irish history, and a regular column by John Martin reporting on the situation of the Repeal Movement (campaigning to repeal the Act of Union under which the Irish Parliament had been abolished). There were also local news of the Irish deportee community, then numbering in the thousands, and of Hobart Town daily life in general.

O'Donoghue used The Irish Exile to publish excerpts of his journal aboard The Swift, which were reprinted in Australian, British and Irish newspapers. Brisbane's The Moreton Bay Courier (reprinted from Dublin's The Nation) found that the journal "will show how severely the tyrannical government of England visited the offences of the Ballingarry cabbage-tree heroes. The studies of Messrs. O'Brien, Meagher (afterwards O'), and O'Donoghoe, will amuse the reader". While in Van Diemen's Land, the Launceston Examiner reprinted London's The Examiner's view that "a singularly large amount of mercy has been shown to those grown-up children who made the escapade from Dublin to raise the standard of Irish rebellion at Ballingarry. One of the worthies, Mr. Patrick O'Donoghue, has published an account of his deportation; and certainly a more pleasureable [sic] voyage could not have been under taken at the expanse of government. A roomy cabin, a capital library, a fair dinner, with a couple of glasses of wine, and cigars upon deck, from the dietary and the entertainment of the political exiles".

Publication of the paper was not in itself illegal, but was highly displeasing to the Governor, Sir William Denison, who found that the paper could be suppressed by arresting O'Donoghue and charging him with having "left his allocated district". He was sentenced to one year's work in a chain-gang – a time spent at hard labour, living in a convict station and wearing a convict uniform, mainly in the company of non-political prisoners such as "rapists, muggers and thieves".

In March 1851 he was released and taken back to Hobart Town. Undeterred, he immediately restarted his paper, prominently featuring an extensive personal account of his year with the chain gang. The governor reacted by sending him again to a chain gang, at a more distant location this time – the Cascades Penal Station. Three months later the governor ordered him released from there and sent to Launceston.

On the way there, he succeeded in escaping from his guards with the help of fellow-prisoners, who managed to smuggle him on board the ship Yarra Yara, on its way to Melbourne.

== Escape to America ==
There, he successfully hid from the British authorities (who may have been tacitly happy to see the last of him) and with further help from Irish sympathisers managed to get to San Francisco, where some of his fellows such as MacManus and Meagher also ended up.

He died in New York City on 22 January 1854, shortly before the arrival of his wife on a ship from Ireland. The time spent in the chain gang may have contributed to undermining his health. The other escaped state prisoners did not attend his funeral, although Michael Doheny and Michael Cavanagh, fellow Young Irelanders who lived in New York, did. Christine Kinealy, 'Repeal and Revolution. 1848 in Ireland', Manchester University Press, 2009.

The local Sinn Féin Cumman (branch of a political party) in Carlow is named after O'Donoghue.

== See also ==
- List of convicts transported to Australia
