= Ballingarry =

Ballingarry may refer to:

== Places ==
- Ballingarry, County Limerick, a village in County Limerick, Ireland
- Ballingarry, North Tipperary, a townland and civil parish in the north of County Tipperary, Ireland
- Ballingarry, South Tipperary, a village in the south of County Tipperary, Ireland
- Ballingarry Coal Mines in Ballingarry, South Tipperary
- Ballymagarry, a townland in Belfast, formerly named Ballingarry

== Other uses ==
- Ballingarry (horse), Irish-bred Thoroughbred racehorse
- Ballingarry GAA, a gaelic sports club in south Tipperary, Ireland
- Ballingarry A.F.C., a soccer club in County Limerick, Ireland
