= Terence MacManus =

Irish rebel (1811 or 1812 – 1861)

Terence Bellew MacManus
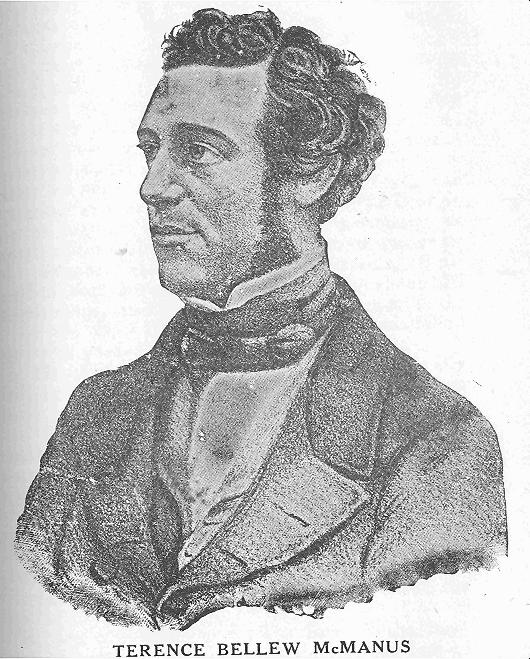
- Terence Bellew MacManus
- Born: c. 1811 (or 1823); Tempo, County Fermanagh, Ireland
- Died: 15 January 1861; San Francisco, California, United States of America

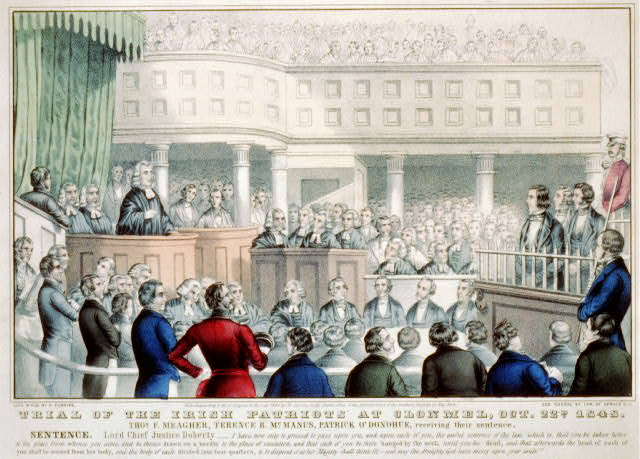
Trial of the Irish patriots at Clonmel. Thomas Francis Meagher, MacManus, and Patrick O'Donoghue receiving their sentences of death.

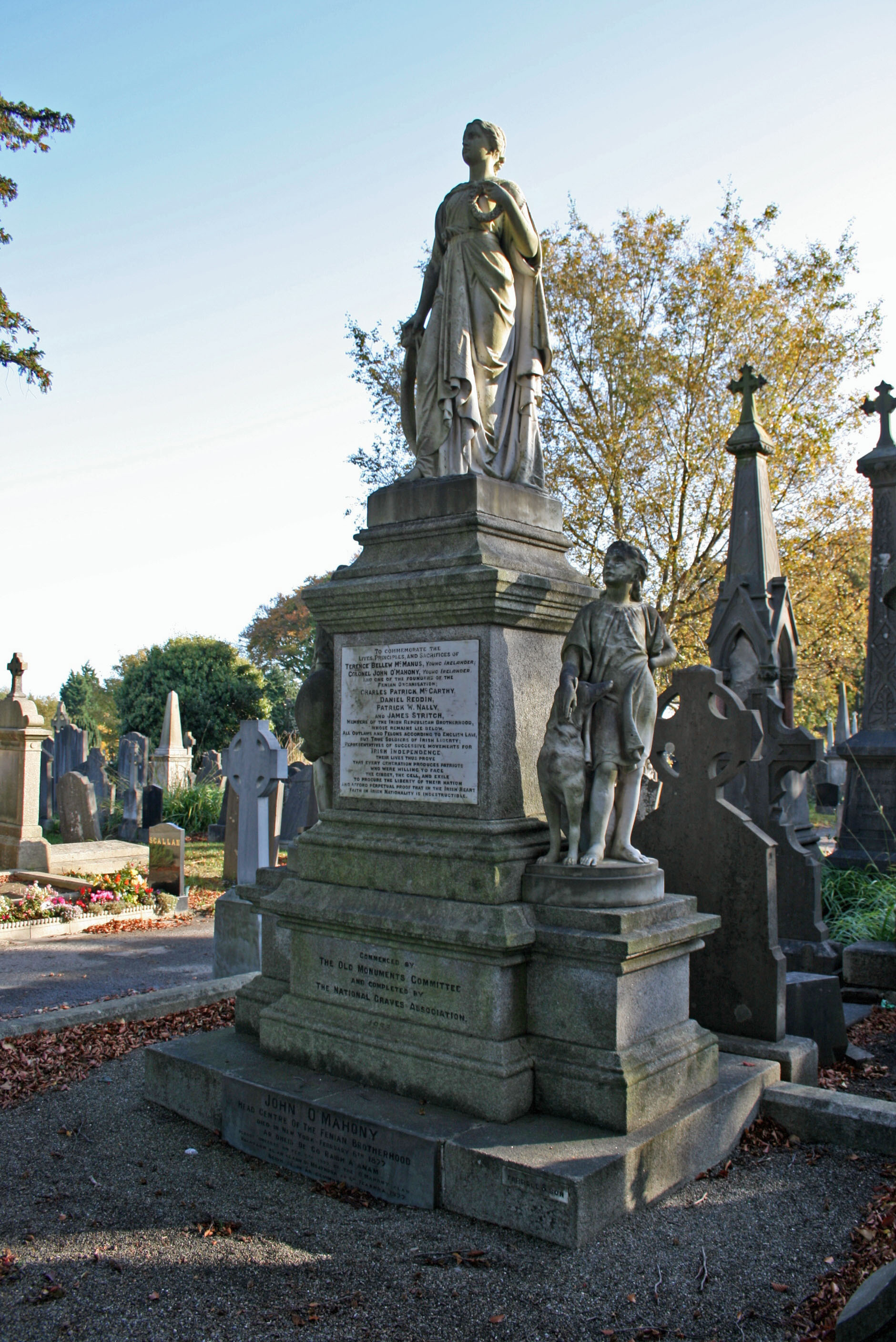
Grave of Terence Bellew MacManus in the Fenian Plot, Glasnevin, Dublin

Terence Bellew MacManus (born 1811 or 1823 – 15 January 1861) was an Irish rebel who participated in the Young Irelander Rebellion of 1848. Sentenced to death for treason, he and several other participants were given commuted sentences in 1849 and transported for life to Van Diemen's Land in Australia. Three years later in 1852, MacManus escaped and emigrated to the United States.

He lived in San Francisco, California, until his death in 1861. There he was unable to re-establish his career. His body was returned to Dublin for burial, where the Fenians gave him a large funeral in honor of his part in the rebellion.

MacManus was notable for his statement in court in 1848; he explained his actions by saying: "...[I]t was not because I loved England less, but because I loved Ireland more."

== Biography ==
Terence MacManus was born about 1811 (or 1823) in Tempo, County Fermanagh, Ireland. He was educated in parochial schools.

As a young man he moved to Liverpool, a major port, where he became a successful shipping agent. In 1848 he returned to Ireland, where he became active in the Repeal Association, which sought to overturn the Act of Union between Great Britain and Ireland. After joining the Irish Confederation, he was among those who took part with William Smith O'Brien and John Blake Dillon in the July 1848 Young Irelander Rebellion in Ballingarry, County Tipperary. MacManus and the other leaders were charged and convicted of treason, and sentenced to death for their actions.

Due to public support for clemency, the men's sentences were commuted to deportation for life. MacManus was transported to Van Diemen's Land in Tasmania, Australia in 1849 on the Swift, together with O'Brien, Thomas Francis Meagher and Patrick O'Donoghue. They were assigned to different settlements to reduce their collaboration in the new land. However, the Irish men continued to meet secretly.

In 1852 MacManus and Meagher escaped from Australia and made their way to San Francisco, California, where MacManus settled. (Meagher went on to New York City.) Like other immigrants, the Irish revolutionaries carried their issues to the United States. Ellis, captain of a ship that was supposed to carry O'Brien to freedom, also emigrated to San Francisco. MacManus held a lynch court of Ellis among Irish emigrants for his betrayal of O'Brien in his escape attempt from Van Diemen's Land. The court martial acquitted Ellis for lack of evidence.

Failing to re-establish his career as a shipping agent, MacManus died in poverty around the age of 50. His body was returned to Ireland, here he was buried in Glasnevin Cemetery, Dublin, on 10 November 1861. Fenians organized a huge funeral and nationalist demonstration to honor MacManus.

According to police reports his funeral procession numbered between 6000 and 7000 people, with 40,000 spectators at Abbey Street. Father Patrick Lavelle delivered an oration at his funeral.

== Quotes ==
From the dock before sentencing, 24 October 1848:

... "I say, whatever part I may have taken in the struggle for my country's independence, whatever part I may have acted in my short career, I stand before you, my lords, with a free heart and a light conscience, to abide the issue of your sentence. And now, my lords, this is, perhaps, the fittest time to put a sentence upon record, which is this - that standing in this dock, and called to ascend the scaffold - it may be to-morrow - it may be now - it may be never - whatever the result may be, I wish to put this on record, that in the part I have taken I was not actuated by enmity towards Englishmen - for among them I have passed some of the happiest days of my life, and the most prosperous; and in no part which I have taken was I actuated by enmity towards Englishmen individually, whatever I may have felt of the injustice of English rule in this island; I therefore say, that it is not because I loved England less, but because I loved Ireland more, that I now stand before you".

== See also ==
- List of convicts transported to Australia
