= Patrick Lavelle =

Father Patrick Lavelle (1825–1886) was a priest and Irish nationalist. Lavelle was born in Mullagh, Murrisk, Co. Mayo, the son of Francis Lavelle a farmer. He was educated at the local hedge school and St Jarlath's College, Tuam. In 1844 he went to Maynooth College and was ordained a Catholic priest at St. Patrick's College, Maynooth, in 1851, and pursued postgraduate studies there as part of the Dunboyne Establishment. He was appointed in 1854 as a professor of philosophy in the Irish College in Paris against the wishes of rector Rev. Dr. John Miley, Lavelles radical politics would have been at odds with Miley who was supported by Cardinal Cullen, the other bishops supported lavelle. Along with philosophy, he taught the Irish Language at the college. He left Paris in 1858 and returned to Ireland.

He became nationally known in 1860 for his actions against proselytism in Toormakeady and its resultant evictions. He was nicknamed Patriot Priest Of Partry. Lavelle also became known for his nationalism, declaring himself a 'traitor' to British rule in Ireland and delivering a famous lecture in July 1863 on the Catholic doctrine of the right of rebellion. In 1861 he delivered a sermon at the funeral of Young Irelander Terence MacManus.

== Sources ==
- Some Famous Mayo People, Bernard O'Hara, in Mayo:Aspects of its Heritage, pp. 272–274, 1982
