= Ballingarry Coal Mines =

Mines in County Tipperary, Ireland

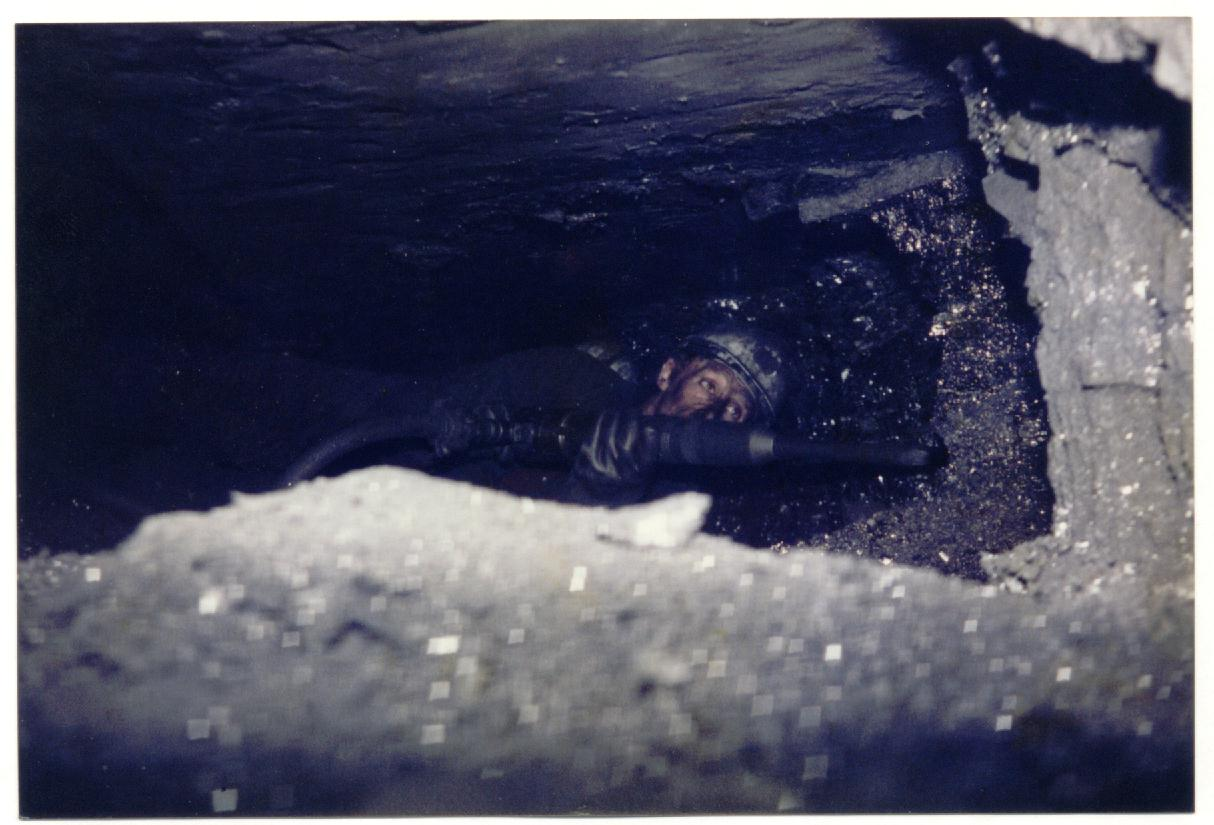
- Man at the coalface in Ballingarry

- Location within Ireland
- Location: Ballingarry, County Tipperary, Ireland; 52.593434°N 7.575452°W
- Products: anthracite
- Type: underground coalmine
- Greatest depth: 700 feet (210 m)
- Opened: 1826
- Closed: 1989
- Website: www.slieveardagh.com/coalmining/ballingarry-coal-mines/

Ballingarry Coal Mines are underground coal mines located near the village of Ballingarry, County Tipperary, Ireland. Situated near the border with County Kilkenny, the mines have become disused and have flooded. Other nearby centres of population are Killenaule and New Birmingham.

== Geology ==
The type of coal mined here was anthracite, a hard, virtually smokeless fuel with a high calorific value and relatively low ash content. The coalfield is situated in the Slievardagh range of hills and is an extension of the Leinster coalfields, being separated by a narrow band of Carboniferous limestone. The deposits, which are highly faulted, consist of three strata, the lowest averaging nine inches in thickness and the others being approximately two feet thick. Due to the inclined coal layer acting as a slippage plane, substantial amounts of the deposits have been crushed and blended with the upper and lower boundary shale. This has resulted in a less commercially attractive material known locally as culm. Due to its high elevation, melting snow in the Slievardagh region intermittently resulted in large volumes of flood-water with a short 'Time of Concentration'. This sometimes threatened to overwhelm the mines' ordinary pumping capacity.

== 19th and early 20th century ==
From 1826, the main commercial enterprise was the Mining Company of Ireland which ended operations in 1926. In the 1840s, 50,000 tons per year were extracted here. The mines featured significantly during the Young Irelander Rebellion of 1848. By 1866, twelve pits were being worked locally while three had recently been abandoned. From 1942 until 1950, the mines were managed by the government under the name Mianrai Teo.

According to the 1837 Topographical Dictionary of Ireland,

The coal field, of which a considerable portion is within this parish, extends 7 miles in length and 3 miles in breadth: the coal is found in three distinct seams of 12, 18, and 24 inches in thickness, lying above each other at intervening distances varying from 90 to 140 feet, dipping to a common centre, and appearing at the surface on all sides: the extreme depth of the lowest seam is about 700 feet. The coal beds lie about 1800 feet over a mass of limestone rock of great thickness, which shews itself at the surface all round on an average within two miles of the pits. The coal field is divided 115 among various proprietors in portions varying from 1000 to 1500 acres, each of whom is the owner of the coal upon his own land. Some of the mines have been drained and worked by the proprietors, by means of day levels or adits, for which the undulation of the surface is extremely favourable; and of late years several of the collieries have been let on lease to the Mining Company of Ireland, who have erected steam-engines for raising the water from the deeper parts of the mines, and made various other improvements for working them to greater advantage. The collieries on the estate of Coalbrook had been worked upon a judicious plan and with great success by the late proprietor, Charles Langley, Esq., for the last 30 years, and are still carried on in a similar manner by the present proprietor.

== Gurteen ==
In 1953, the mining lease for the area was purchased from the government by Tommy O'Brien for £50,000. O'Brien, originally from County Mayo, returned from Lancashire in England and soon many locals who had also emigrated from the area returned to work the mines. Three years later, 330 men were employed there and future employment prospects were good, with the new pit at Gurteen having been recently opened and "British coal up another 30 shillings a ton in the Dublin area". Wages varied between £15 and £25 per week, depending on quantity mined. By the early 1970s, the mines were in financial difficulties and management were seeking government intervention. In 1971, 100 workers were made redundant and the following year the mines went into receivership resulting in the redundancy of another 150 men, just before the first oil crisis. Maintenance of the mines was continued for a period, and disaster was narrowly averted in 1973 when an underground fire threatened the lives of 17 workers. Despite these efforts the mines closed, and with the pumps disconnected the pits flooded. The second oil crisis resulted in soaring fuel prices, and it appeared the mines would once again be seen as a viable enterprise.

== Lickfinn ==
In 1978, Kealy Mines commenced explorations in the area. The name derived from the surnames of its two principals, Patrick Keating, a civil engineer originally from Ballylooby in Tipperary and Gilbert Howley, a native of County Mayo. As a student, Keating had worked for O'Brien at the Gurteen pit before emigrating to work on the M1 motorway in England. He returned to Ireland in the early sixties and later became involved with Howley in the latter's civil engineering and excavation business. They reopened workings at Lickfinn, near the village of New Birmingham, which accessed the coal by slope mining. Initially the mines employed 34 miners and the Electricity Supply Board expressed an interest in using Ballingarry coal for the generation of power and so reduce its dependence on imported oil. However, in preliminary testing at a power station designed to burn peat, the high temperatures produced by the anthracite caused its fire-grates to overheat. Coal dust was supplied to the Irish Sugar processing plant at Thurles and they became an important customer. Financing also proved a difficulty for Kealy Mines, and it was acquired by a Canadian consortium in 1982. Flair Resources Ltd., trading as Tipperary Anthracite was headed by John Young, a Tipperary emigrant to Canada. The new company expanded the workforce to 80 and transferred surface processing such as washing, screening and bagging to the old pithead at Gurteen. It also opened a second underground 'cutting' and investigated exploiting the more marginal No. 1 seam. An electrically powered coal-cutter was employed and investment allowed some further modernisation of plant. Extraction concentrated on the No. 2 seam, with its reserves estimated at that time to be 3 million tonnes. By 1985, Tipperary Anthracite was also in receivership. Financial irregularities regarding IDA grants were investigated by the Gardaí and highlighted on RTÉ current affairs programme Today Tonight. In 1989, Emereld Resources was granted a licence to reopen the mines and for a while sporadic work continued at Lickfinn-Earl's Hill.

== Legacy ==
Mining on a reduced scale progressed for some time before the pit again closed.

As part of a local initiative, the Old School at the Commons was renovated by Slieveardagh Rural Development. It displays numerous artifacts relating to the mining heritage of the Slieve Ardagh region and is also intended as a social centre for former miners and their families.

== Colloquial mining terms used at Ballingarry ==
- 'Banshee', a compressed-air rock drill with an extending mono-pod, used to bore holes for explosives.
- 'Puncheon', a round timber strut (approx. 4 inches diameter) to support overburden in areas where coal was extracted.
- 'Chock', lengths of pine-trunk 3 feet long and from 9 to 12 inches in diameter and roughly sawn to give two flat surfaces. They were used on the flat to construct square supports if more substantial support than puncheons was required.
- 'Bogey', rail car for transporting support-timbers (and occasionally miners).
- 'Tub', rail car for transporting coal and shale.
- 'Cane', stick of gelignite.
- 'Pit bottom', limit of main road sloping from surface (at approx. 25 degrees) and where the largest pumps were positioned. Miners walked down the pit at Lickfinn, on rough-cut steps beside the single narrow-gauge rail. At the pit bottom, horizontal roads (also with a single rail-track), branched left and right. As the branch roads progressed, switched sidings were extended to 'park' tubs near the work area.
- 'Topple', a sloping drift off the branch road and following the coal seam upwards. It was excavated only to the depth of the coal. This was where most of the coal was extracted by miners lying flat in the two feet headroom.
- 'Chute', a metal bin fixed at the end of a topple and extending over the branch road. A trap-door was opened and closed to progressively fill a series of tubs on the road. Galvanised sheets extending from the chute up to the 'coal face' allowed the miners to fill the chute assisted by gravity. The full tubs were then winched or pushed to the pit bottom. There they were attached to the main winch for hoisting to the surface, tipped, and the empties returned.
- 'Shining ball', form of culm or duff, high in clay content.
- 'Jigger', pneumatic pick.
- 'Tally', a brass token with a stamped number threaded on a string and carried by the miner around his neck. It was placed by the 'Hurrier' in the full tub to indicate which team had mined it. Tallies were used to calculate production-based bonuses.
- 'Fireman', the foreman responsible for detonating explosives at the end of a shift.

== Other coal mines in Ireland ==
- Deerpark Mines, Castlecomer.
- Arigna, County Roscommon.
- Ballycastle, County Antrim.
- Baurnafea, County Kilkenny. (Historic)
