= Famine Warhouse 1848 =

- Teach Cogaidh Bhaile na Gharraí
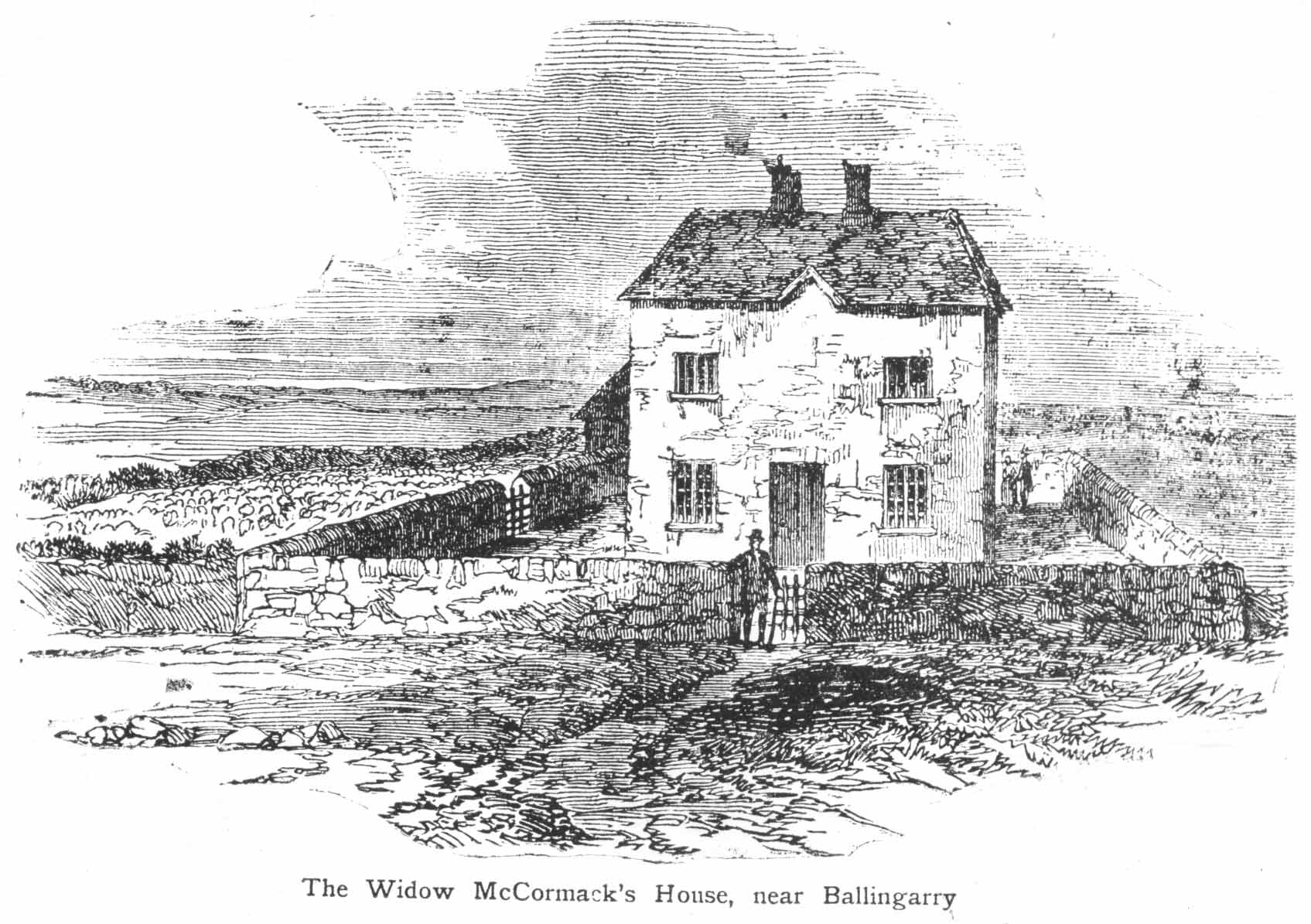
- Engraving from Michael Doheny's The Felon's Track (1849)

- Location within Ireland
- Alternative names: Ballingarry Warhouse; The Widow Margaret McCormack's House

General information
- Status: Museum
- Type: Farmhouse
- Architectural style: Vernacular
- Location: Farranrory Upper, Ballingarry, Ireland
- Coordinates: 52.619273°N 7.522898°W
- Elevation: 292 m (958 ft)

Technical details
- Material: Stone, slate
- Floor count: 2

Design and construction
- Designations

National monument of Ireland
- Official name: Ballingarry Warhouse
- Designated: April 1989
- Reference no.: 659
- Known for: Battle site

Famine Warhouse 1848, traditionally known as the Ballingarry Warhouse or The Widow McCormack's House, is an Irish farmhouse famous as the site of a skirmish in the Young Irelander Rebellion of 1848 (Ireland's contribution to the Springtime of the Peoples), at which the Irish tricolour was flown for the first time.

Located 3.9 km (2.4 mi) north-northeast of Ballingarry, South Tipperary, the house was owned at the time of the battle by Margaret McCormack, the widow of Thomas McCormack. Rebels led by William Smith O'Brien besieged 47 policemen of the Irish Constabulary. After the loss of two men the rebels retreated, and were later arrested and transported.

Known locally as the Warhouse, it became a National Monument in 1989, was renovated in 2000–01 and was renamed "Famine Warhouse 1848" in 2004. Today it houses a museum with exhibits on the Great Famine and mass emigration, the rebellion, the high treason trials and exile of the Young Ireland leaders in Australia and their escapes to the US.
