= Young Ireland rebellion =

1848 failed Irish nationalist uprising

Young Irelander Rebellion
- Part of the Revolutions of 1848
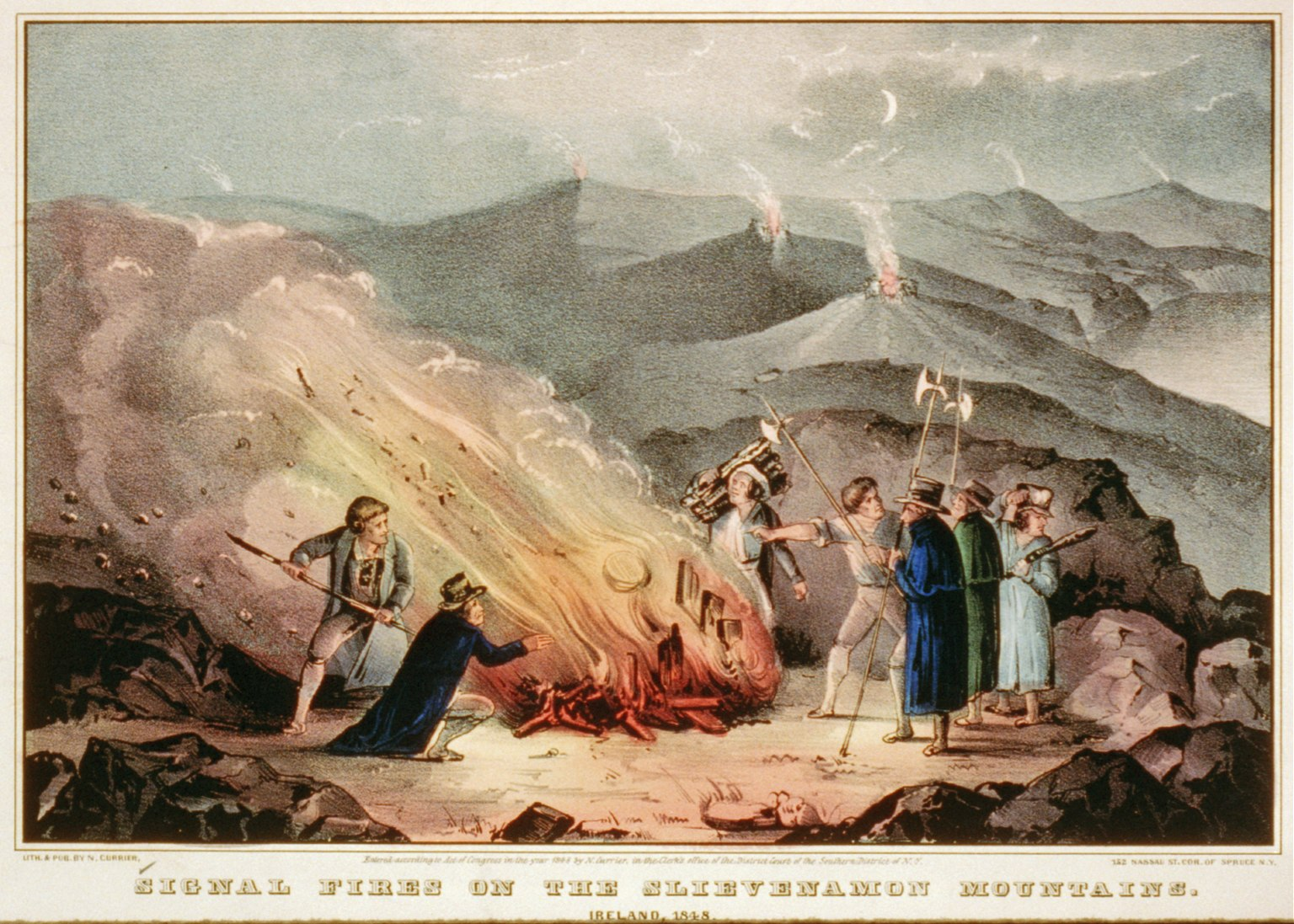
- Rebels lightning a fire on Slievenamon
Date	29 July 1848
Location	Ballingarry, County Tipperary, Ireland 52.59°N 7.54°W
Result	Rebellion suppressed

Belligerents
Young Ireland	United Kingdom of Great Britain and Ireland: Royal Irish Constabulary

Commanders and leaders
William Smith O'Brien; Thomas Meagher; Michael Doheny	Thomas Trant; Joseph Cox

Strength
2,000 poorly armed locals	around 50, larger number of reinforcements arrived later

Casualties and losses
2 killed: Thomas Walsh; Patrick McBride	
- Location within Ireland

The Young Irelander Rebellion was a failed Irish nationalist uprising led by the Young Ireland movement, part of the wider Revolutions of 1848 that affected most of Europe. It took place on 29 July 1848 at Farranrory, a small settlement about 4.3 km north-northeast of the village of Ballingarry, South Tipperary. After being chased by a force of Young Irelanders and their supporters, an Irish Constabulary unit took refuge in a house and held those inside as hostages. A several-hour gunfight followed, but the rebels fled after a large group of police reinforcements arrived.

It is sometimes called the Famine Rebellion (as it took place during the Great Irish Famine), the Battle of Ballingarry or the Battle of Widow McCormack's Cabbage Patch.

== Background ==
As with the earlier United Irishmen, who sought to emulate the French Revolution, the Young Irelanders were inspired by Republicanism in America and in Europe.

The year 1848 was a year of revolutions throughout continental Europe. In France, King Louis Philippe was overthrown by the February Revolution and the Second Republic was proclaimed in Paris. This revolution sent political shock waves across Europe, and revolutions broke out in Berlin, Vienna, Rome, Prague, and Budapest. At least temporarily, absolutist governments were replaced by liberal administrations, suffrage was introduced for a portion of the population and elections were held to constituent assemblies to draw up new national constitutions. It was sometimes described as the "springtime of the people".

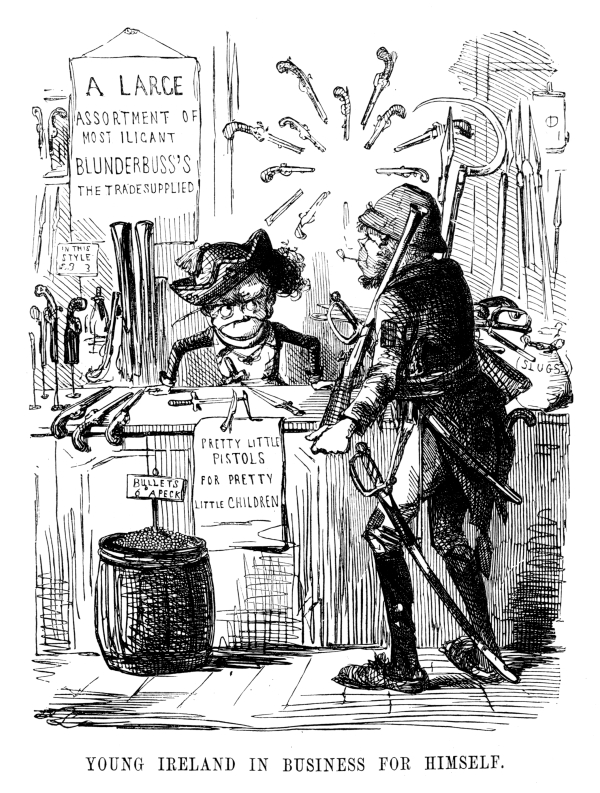
Depiction in Punch (1846) of the split: "Young Ireland in Business for Himself", British depiction of Smith O'Brien in Repeal cap selling weapons to a stereotyped Irishman.

Ireland was also still reeling from the impact of the Great Famine. The British government's reaction had been too little and too late to prevent the Irish people from suffering great hardship. This delayed reaction was criticized by Irish officials, to little avail.

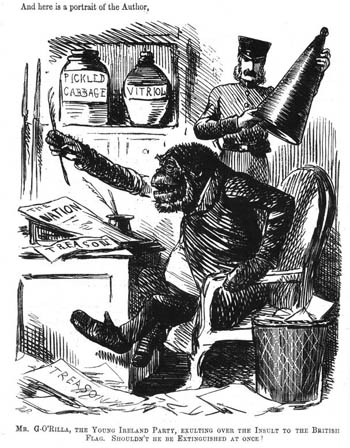
Depiction from Punch of "Mr. G. O'Rilla of the Young Ireland Party," reading The Nation with pickled cabbage and vitriol in jars on his shelf. A policeman holds an extinguisher to snuff him out.

Inspired by these events and the success of liberal, romantic nationalism on the European mainland and disgusted by Daniel O'Connell's consideration of a renewed alliance with the British Whigs, a group known as Young Ireland broke away from O'Connell's Repeal Association. They took an uncompromising stand for a national Parliament with full legislative and executive powers. At its founding, the Confederation resolved to be based on principles of freedom, tolerance and truth. While the young men did not call for rebellion, neither would they make absolute pledges for peace. Their goal was independence of the Irish nation and they held to any means to achieve that which were consistent with honour, morality and reason. The Young Irelanders, as they had become known, longed to see achieved in Ireland the liberties achieved on the Continent. At the beginning of 1847, they formed an organisation known as The Irish Confederation.

Leaders William Smith O'Brien, Thomas Francis Meagher and Richard O'Gorman led a delegation to Paris to congratulate the new French Republic. Meagher returned to Ireland with a tricolour flag (now the national flag) – a symbol of the reconciliation of the green of Catholic Gaelic Ireland with the orange of Protestant Anglo Ireland.

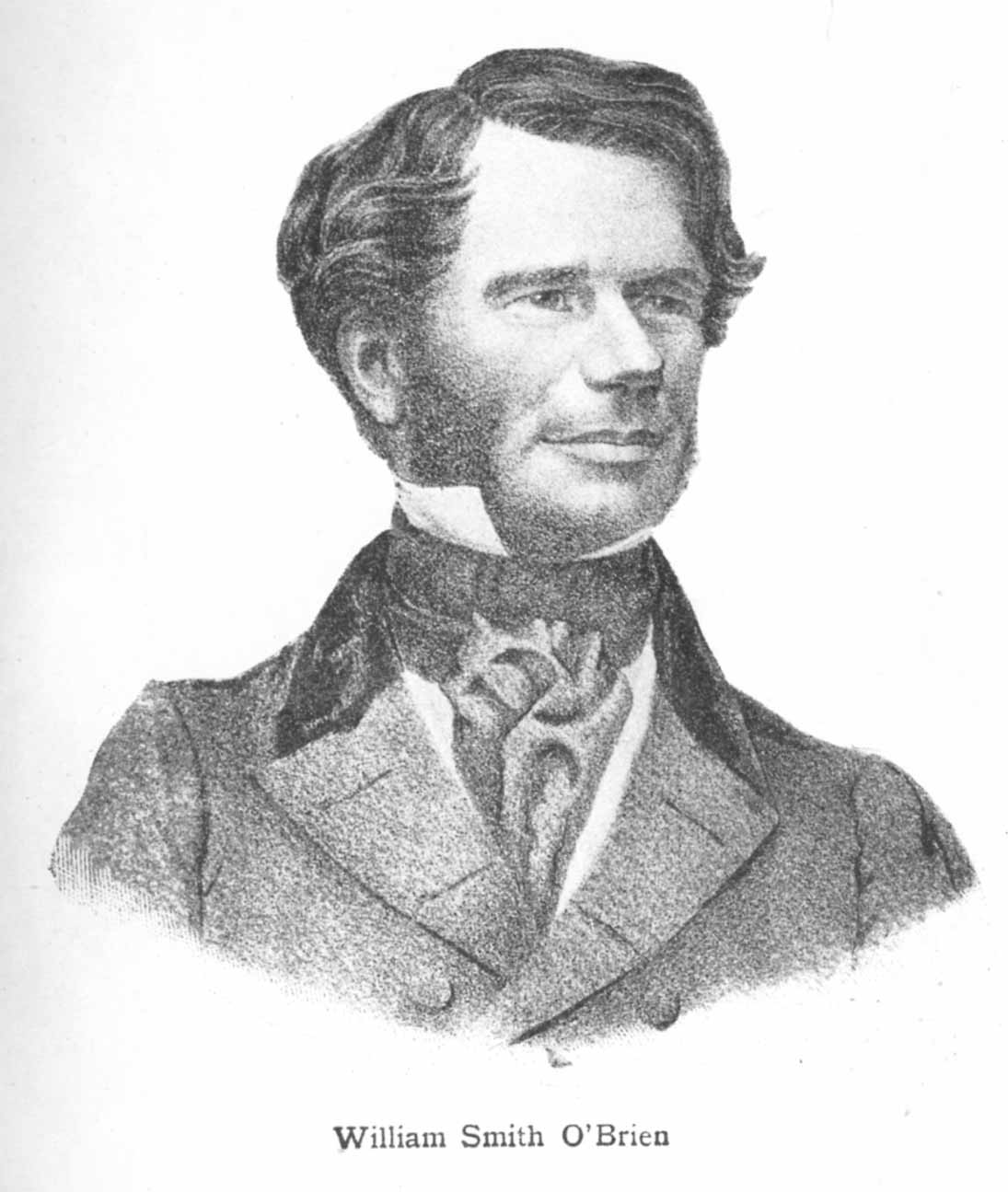
William Smith O'Brien

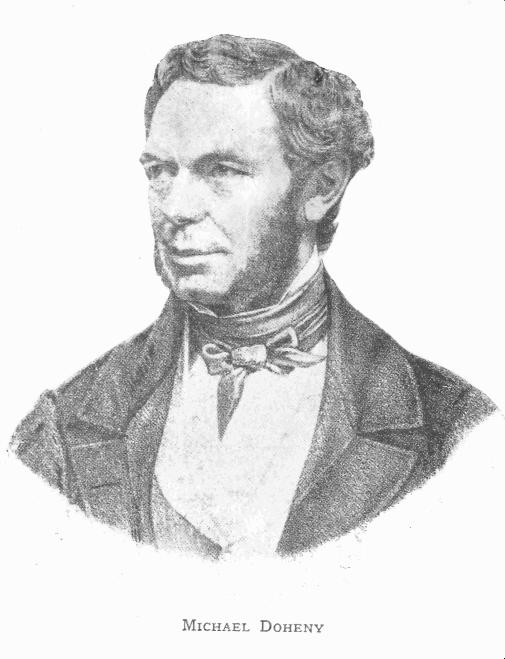
Michael Doheny

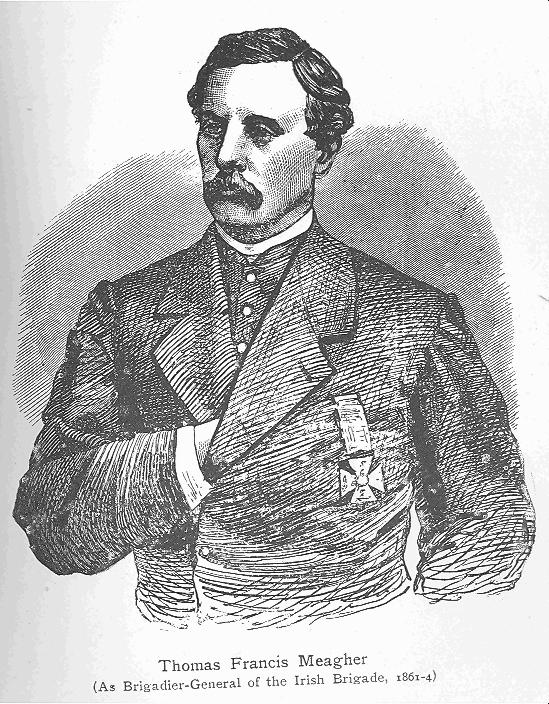
Thomas Francis Meagher

Since most of the continental revolutions were relatively bloodless, O'Brien believed he could attain similar results in Ireland. He hoped to unite Irish landlords and tenants in protest against British rule. The government, however, forced the leaders' hands on 22 July 1848 by announcing the suspension of habeas corpus. This meant they could imprison the Young Irelanders and other opponents on proclamation without trial. Having to choose between armed resistance or an ignominious flight, O'Brien decided that the movement would have to make a stand.

== Rebellion ==
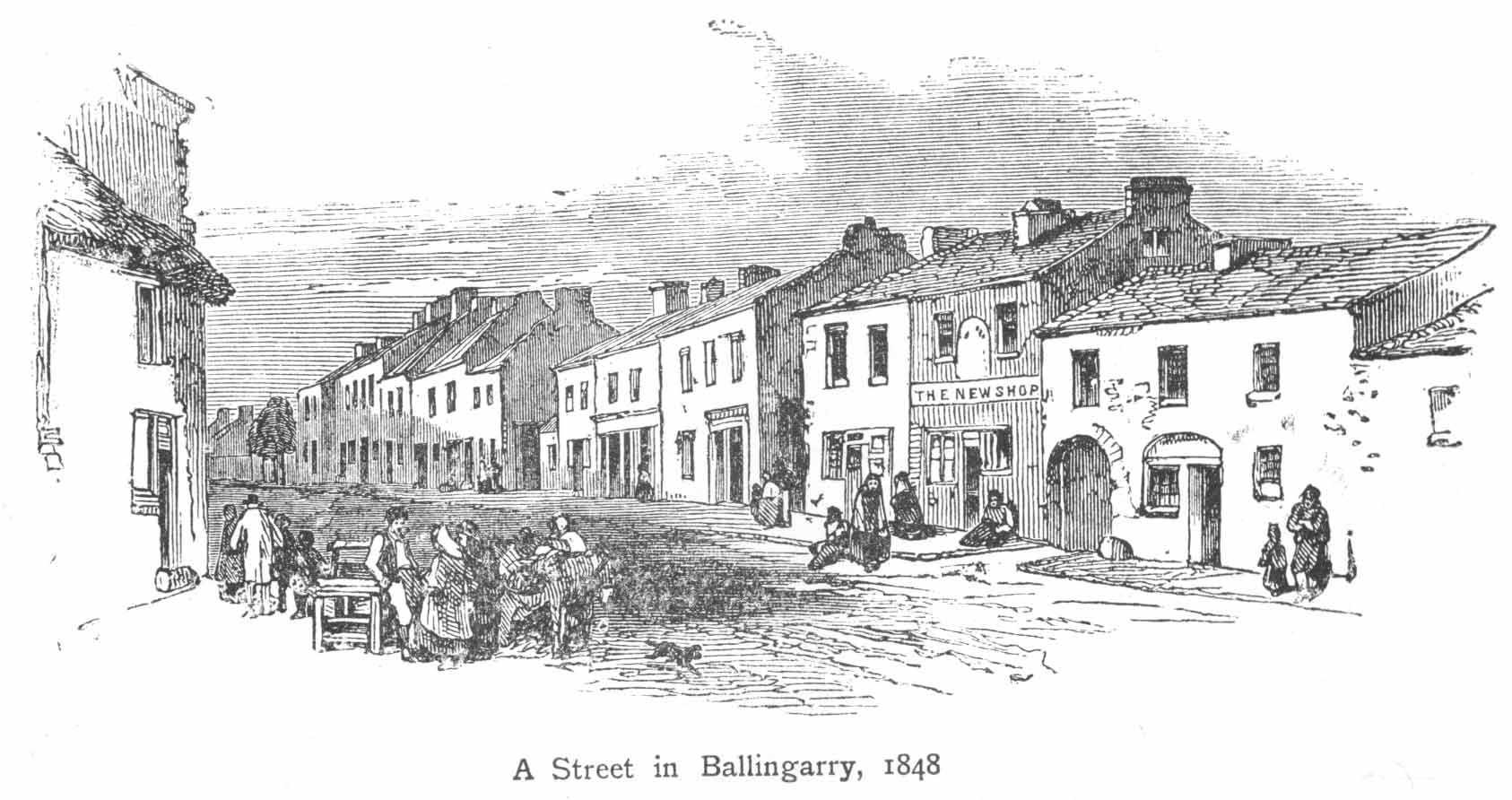
Ballingarry in 1848

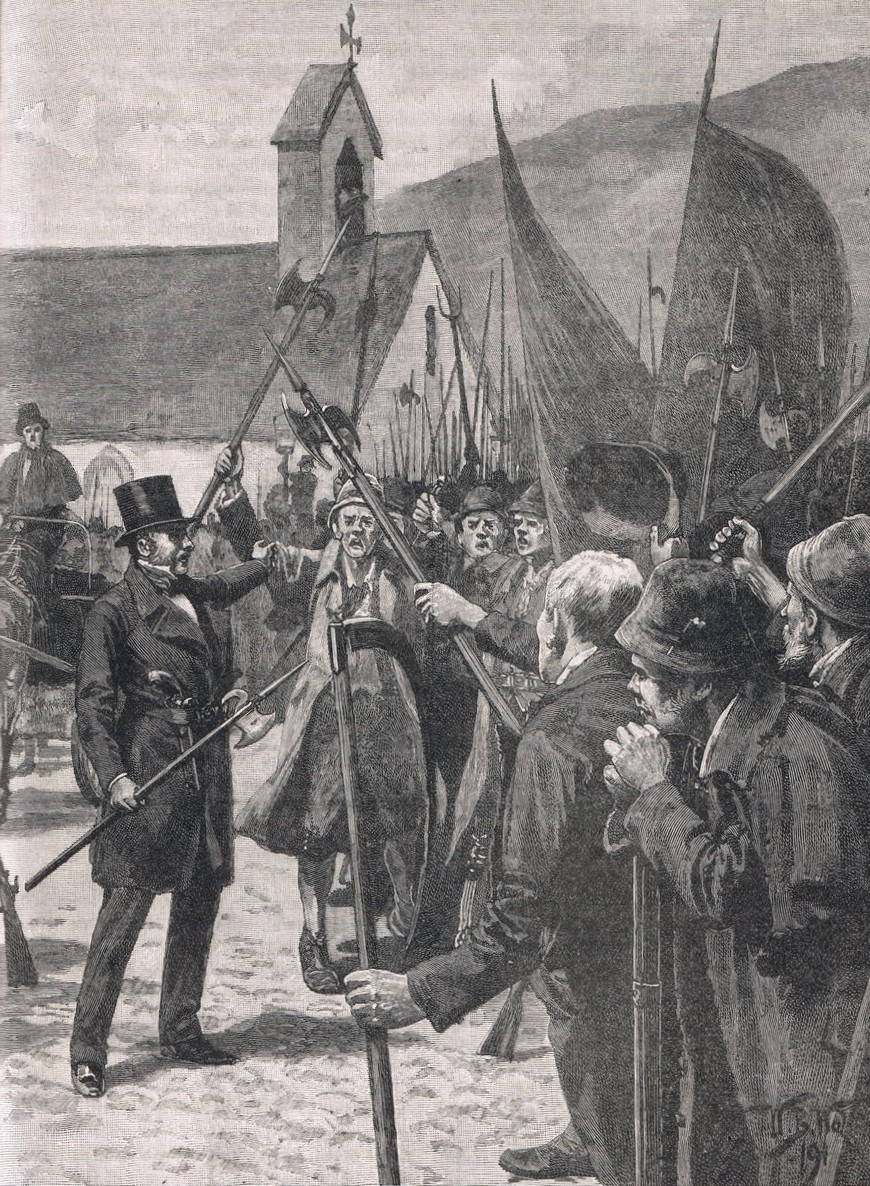
Muster of the Irish at Mullinahone, July 1848

On the 16 of July 1848, William Smith O'Brien, Thomas Francis Meagher and Michael Doheny gathered 50,000 people on the mountain of Slievenamon in County Tipperary. From 23 to 29 July 1848, O'Brien, Meagher and Dillon raised the standard of revolt as they travelled from County Wexford through County Kilkenny and into County Tipperary. The last great gathering of Young Ireland leaders took place in the village of The Commons on 28 July. The next day, O'Brien was in The Commons where barricades had been erected, near the Commons colliery, to prevent his arrest. His local supporters—miners, tradesmen and small tenant farmers—awaited the arrival of the military and police. As the police from Callan approached the crossroads before The Commons from Ballingarry, they saw barricades in front of them and, thinking discretion the better part of valour, they veered right up the road toward County Kilkenny. The rebels followed them across the fields.

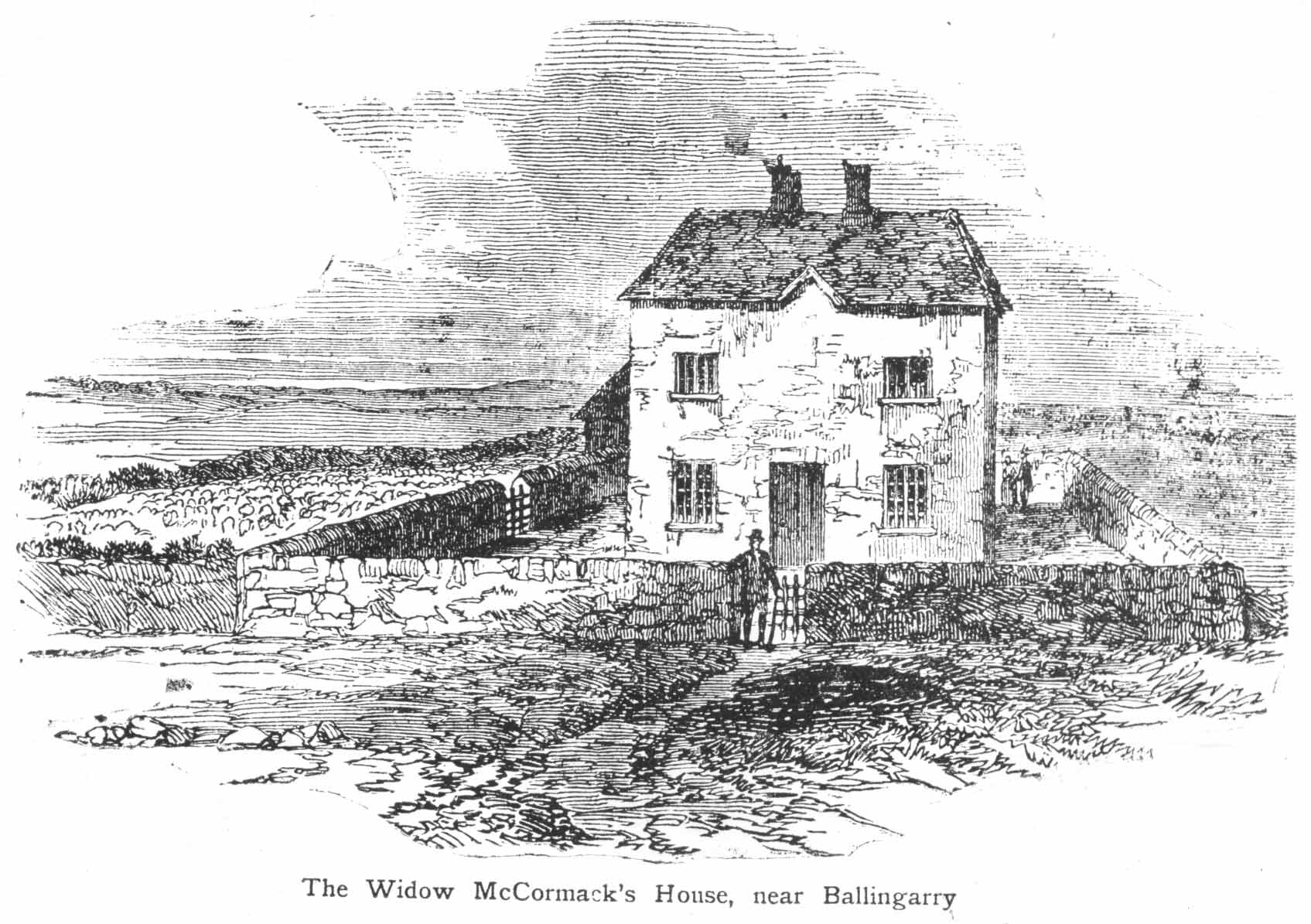
The Widow McCormack's House at Farranrory near Ballingarry, where Trant and his policemen took refuge

Sub-Inspector Trant and his 46 policemen took refuge in a large two-storey farmhouse, taking the five young children in the house as hostages. They barricaded themselves in, pointing their guns from the windows. The house was surrounded by the rebels and a stand-off ensued. Mrs. Margaret McCormack, the owner of the house and mother of the children, demanded to be let into her house, but the police refused and would not release the children. Mrs. McCormack found O'Brien reconnoitering the house from the out-buildings and asked him what was to become of her children and her house.

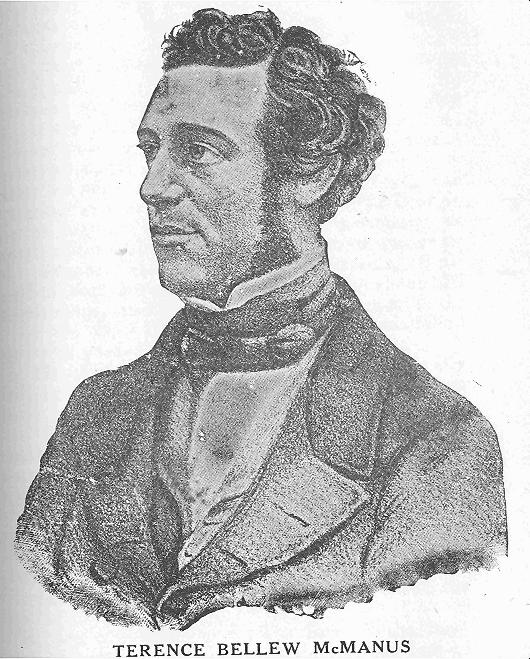
Terence MacManus

O'Brien and Mrs. McCormack went up to the parlour window of the house to speak to the police. Through the window, O'Brien stated, "We are all Irishmen—give up your guns and you are free to go." O'Brien shook hands with some of the police through the window. The initial report to the Lord Lieutenant of Ireland stated that a constable fired the first shot at O'Brien, who was attempting to negotiate. General firing then ensued between the police and the rebels. O'Brien had to be dragged out of the line of fire by James Stephens and Terence Bellew MacManus, both of whom were wounded.

The rebels were incensed that they had been fired upon without provocation, and the shooting went on for a number of hours. During the initial exchange of fire, the rebels at the front of the house—men, women and children—crouched beneath the wall. So great was the pressure of the crowd that one man, Thomas Walsh, was forced to cross from one side of the front gate to the other. As he crossed between the gate piers he was shot dead by the police. During lulls in the shooting, the rebels retreated out of the range of fire. Another man, Patrick McBride, who had been standing at the gable-end of the house when the firing began—and was quite safe where he was—found that his companions had retreated. Jumping up on the wall to run and join them, he was fatally wounded by the police.

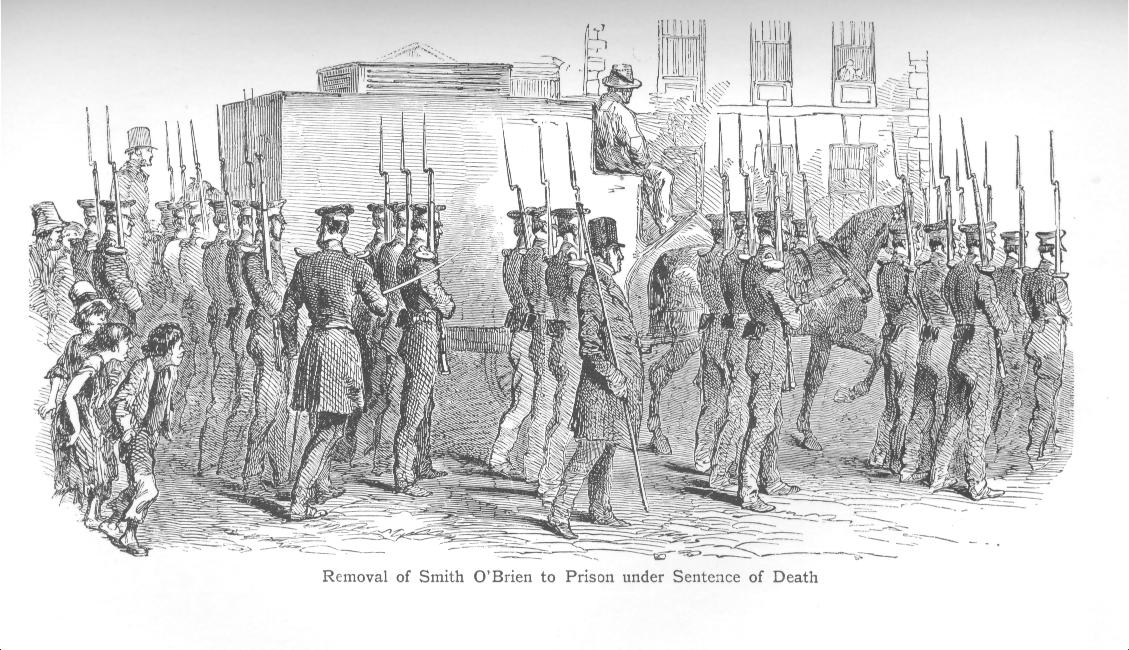
Removal of Smith O'Brien under sentence of death

It was evident to the rebels that the position of the police was almost impregnable, and a Catholic clergyman of the parish, Rev. Philip Fitzgerald, endeavoured to mediate in the interests of peace. When a party of the Cashel police under Sub-Inspector Cox were seen arriving over Boulea Hill, the rebels attempted to stop them even though they were low on ammunition, but the police continued to advance, firing up the road. It became clear that the police in the house were about to be reinforced and rescued. The rebels then faded away, effectively terminating both the era of Young Ireland and Repeal, but the consequences of their actions would follow them for many years. This event is colloquially known as "the Battle of Widow McCormack's cabbage plot".

== Aftermath ==
John Mitchel, the most committed advocate of revolution, had been arrested early in 1848, then convicted on the purposefully–created charge of treason-felony. He was sentenced to transportation to Bermuda, where he joined other convicts labouring on the construction of the Royal Naval Dockyard on Ireland Island. He was subsequently sent to Van Diemen's Land (in present-day Tasmania, Australia) where he was soon to be joined by other leaders, such as William Smith O'Brien and Thomas Francis Meagher who had both been arrested after Ballingarry. John Blake Dillon escaped to France, as did three of the younger members, James Stephens, John O'Mahony and Michael Doheny. Meagher and John Mitchel (who had been transported there before for political activities) both managed to escape and emigrate to the United States in the early 1850s. They served on opposite sides of the American Civil War: Meagher serving with the Union, for which he recruited and commanded the Irish Brigade, and Mitchel allying himself with the South and living there, sending three sons to fight with the Confederacy.

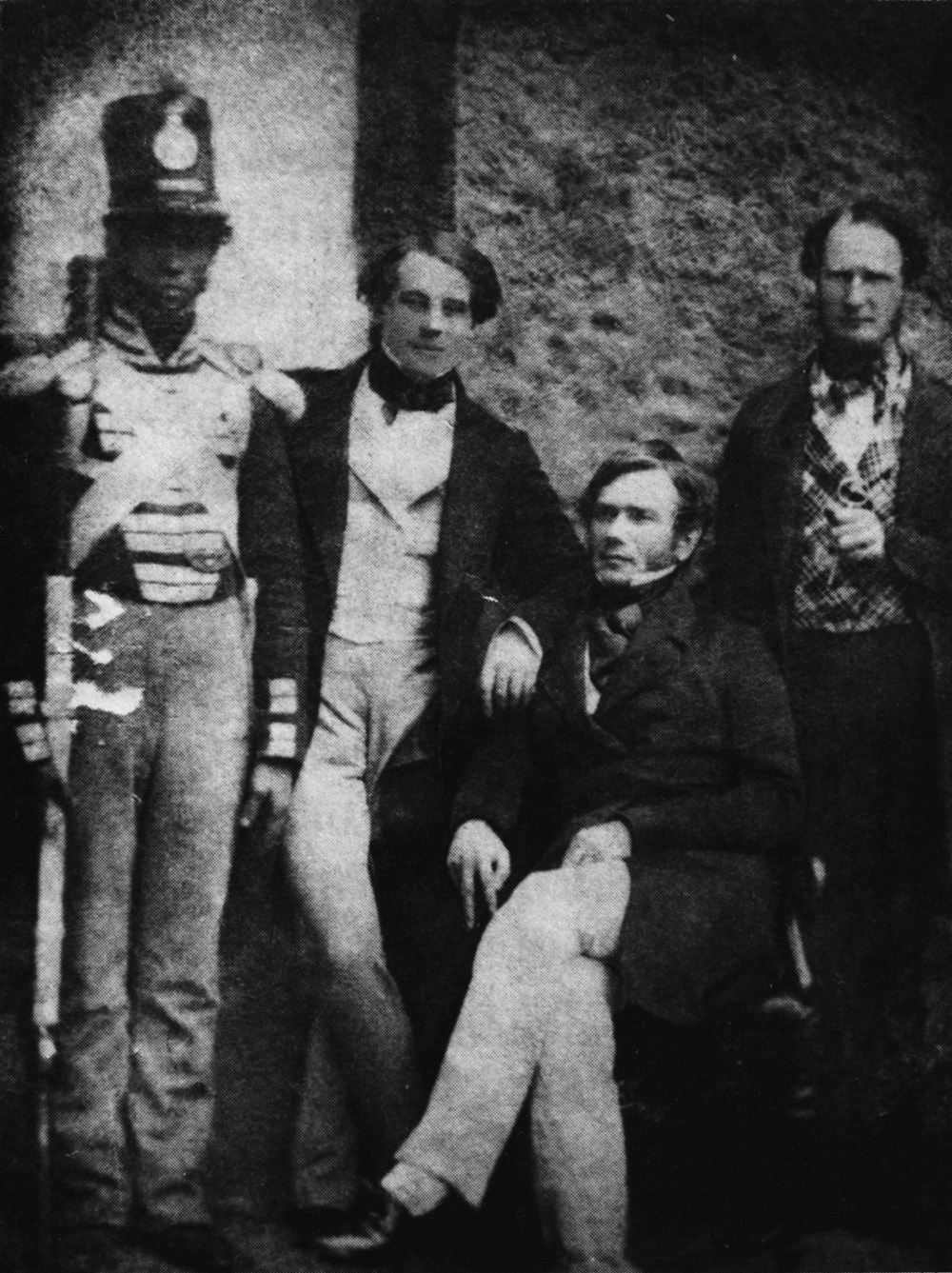
Daguerreotype of Thomas Francis Meagher, William Smith O'Brien with soldier and jailer in Kilmainhaim Gaol after the rebellion, 1848.

The McCormack family emigrated to the US in about 1853. Since that time, the McCormack house (which was owned by numerous other families after 1848) has always been known locally as the Warhouse. In 2004, the State decided on "Famine Warhouse 1848" as the official name of the house, which had been designated a national heritage monument.

=== Fenian Brotherhood, Irish Republican Brotherhood ===
After the collapse of the rebellion, James Stephens and John O'Mahony went to the Continent to avoid arrest. In Paris, they supported themselves by teaching and with translation work and planned the next stage of "the fight to overthrow British rule in Ireland". In 1856, O'Mahony went to America and founded the Fenian Brotherhood in 1858. Stephens returned to Ireland and in Dublin on St. Patrick's Day 1858, following an organising tour through the length and breadth of the country, founded the Irish counterpart of the American Fenians, the Irish Republican Brotherhood.

== See also ==
- List of Irish rebellions
- John Blake Dillon
- Terence MacManus
- Thomas Francis Meagher
- William Smith O'Brien
- Father John Kenyon
- Young Ireland
