= Ballingarry, South Tipperary =

Village in County Tipperary, Ireland

Ballingarry Baile an Gharraí
- Village
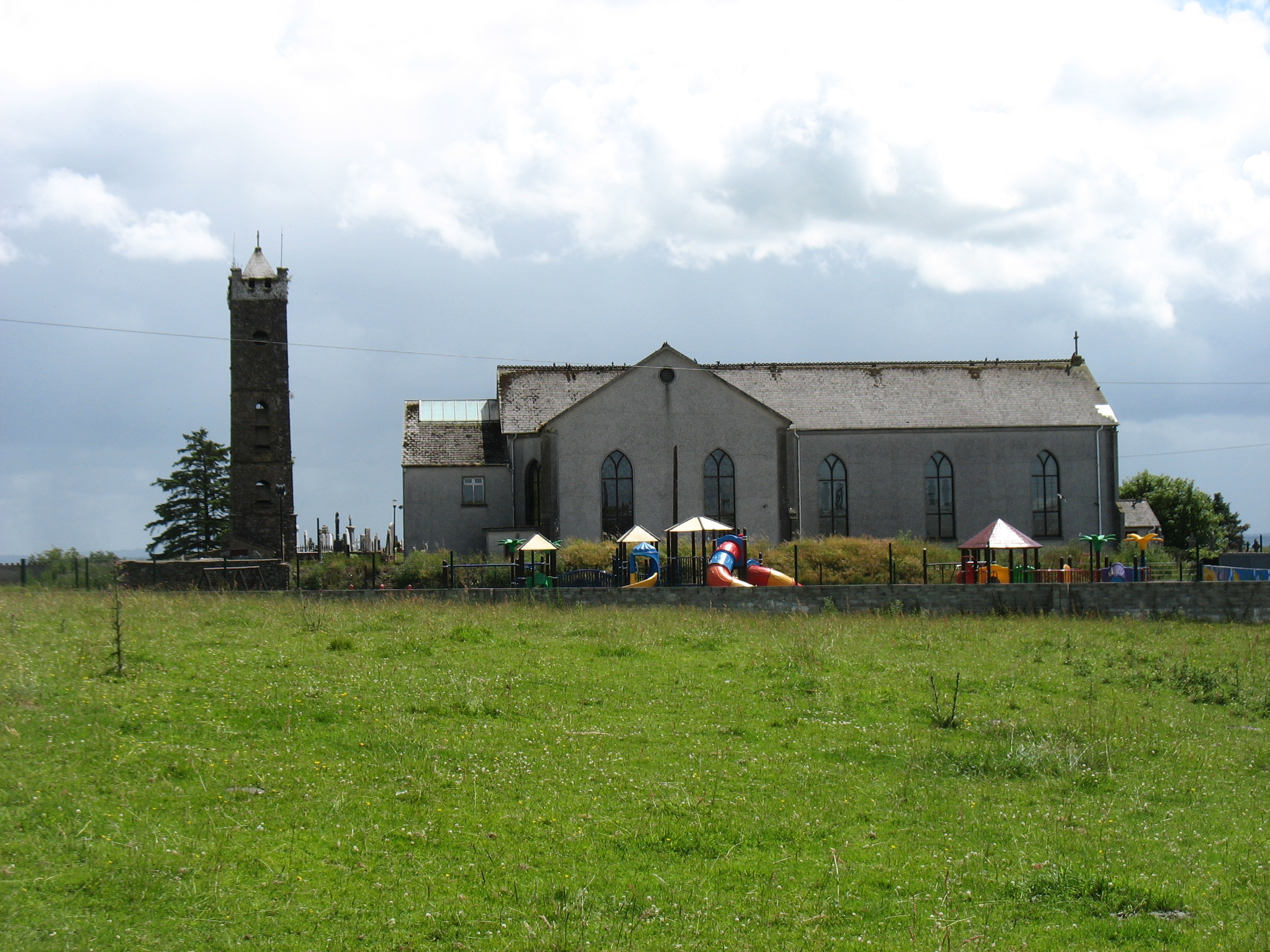
- Church of the Assumption

- Location in Ireland
- Coordinates: 52°35′N 7°32′W
- Country: Ireland
- Province: Munster
- County: Tipperary
- Elevation: 204 m (669 ft)

Population (2016)
  - Total: 269
- Time zone: UTC+0 (WET)
  - Summer (DST): UTC-1 (IST (WEST))
- Irish Grid Reference: S310484

Ballingarry (Irish: Baile an Gharraí, meaning 'town of the garden') is a village and civil parish in County Tipperary, Ireland. Ballingarry is one of 19 civil parishes in the barony of Slievardagh, and also the name of an ecclesiastical parish in the Roman Catholic Archdiocese of Cashel and Emly. Ballingarry village is situated near the County Kilkenny border on route R691 in the Slieveardagh range. Historically, the area was associated with the coal mining industry.

== History ==
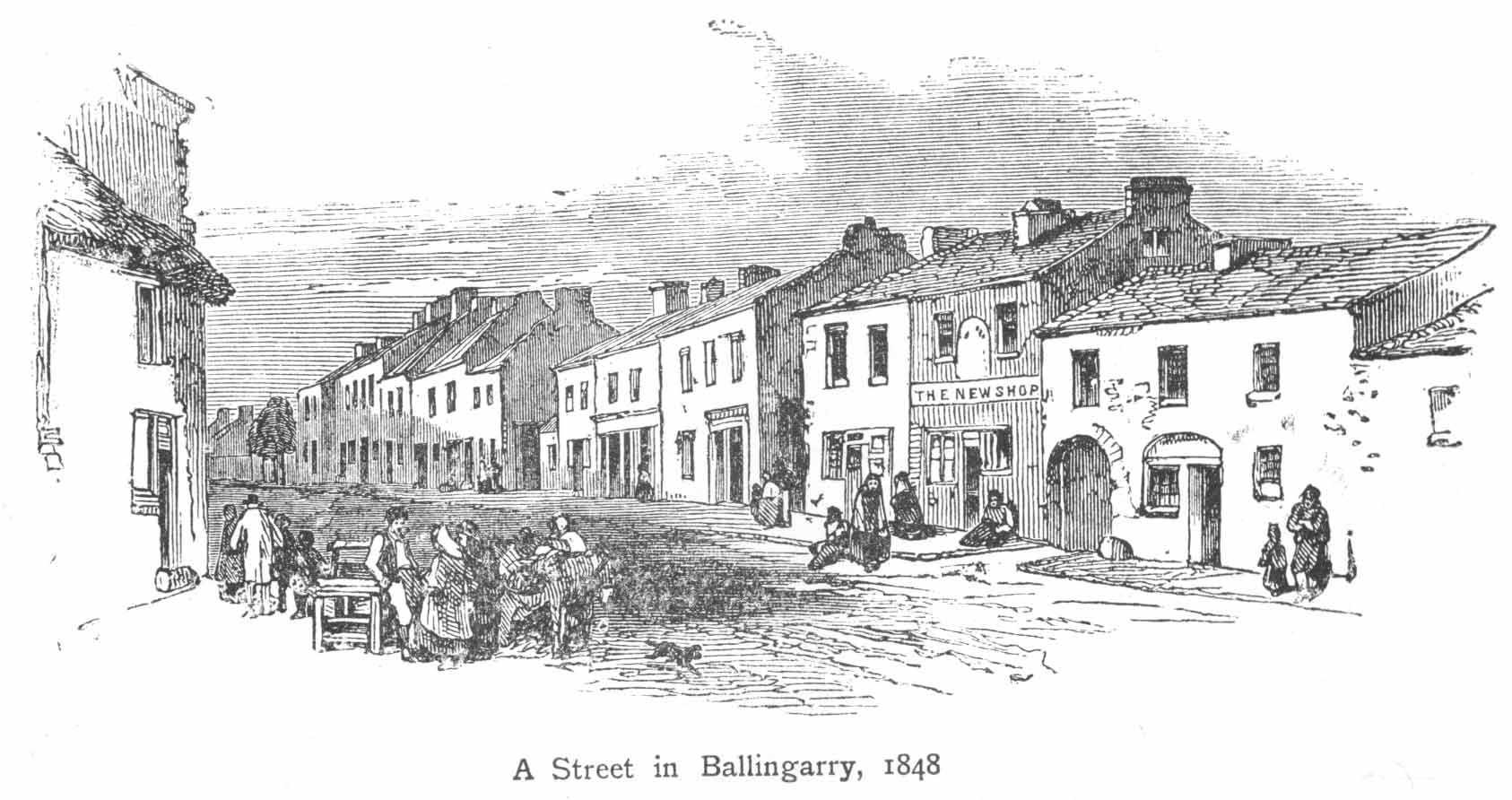
Ballingarry village in 1848

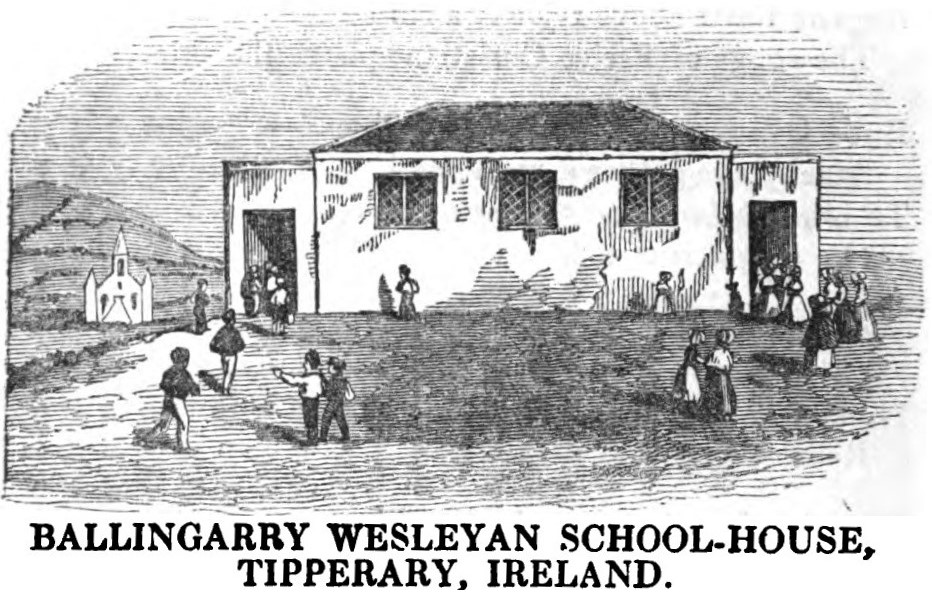
Ballingarry Wesleyan School-House, Tipperary, Ireland (p.72, 1849)

Ballingarry is best known for the rebellion that broke out there on 29 July 1848 against British rule. The site of this uprising, the McCormack House, known also as the Warhouse (officially Famine Warhouse 1848) has since been designated as a national memorial and historical building by the State. It was here during the ill-fated rebellion that the national tricolour of green, white and orange was unfurled for the first time by the rebels, led by William Smith O'Brien, thus emulating the French rebels who also took to the streets with their tricolour for the first time earlier that year. Sub-Inspector Trant and 46 other local policemen took refuge from the rebels in a large two-story farmhouse, taking the five young children in the house as hostages. They barricaded themselves in, pointing their guns from the windows. The house was surrounded by the rebels and a stand-off ensued. Mrs. Margaret McCormack, the owner of the house and mother of the children, demanded to be let into her house, but the police refused and would not release the children. Mrs. McCormack found O'Brien reconnoitring the house from the out-buildings, and asked him what was to become of her children and her house.

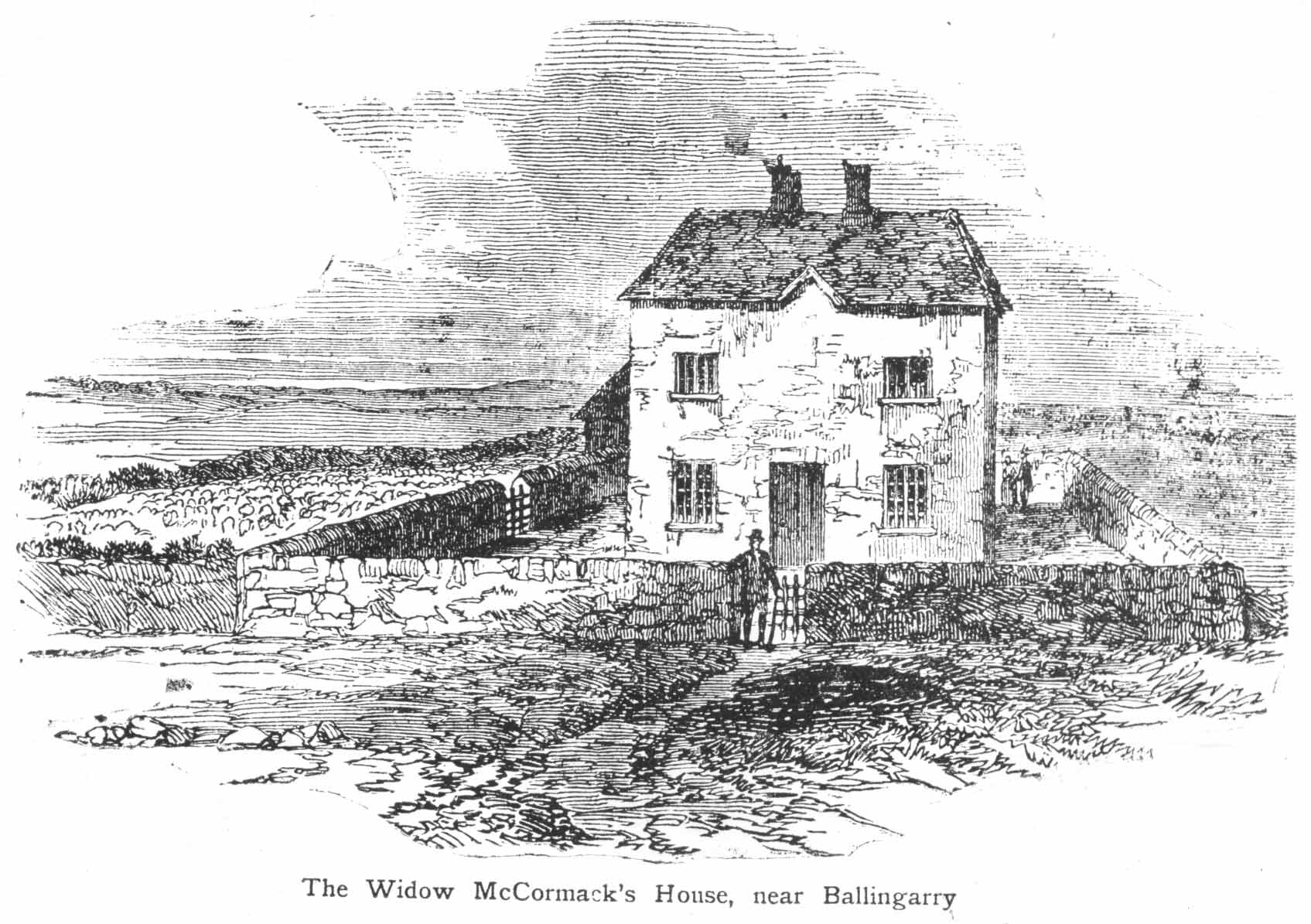
The Widow McCormack's House

O'Brien and Mrs. McCormack went up to the parlour window of the house to speak to the police. Through the window, O'Brien stated, "We are all Irishmen—give up your guns and you are free to go." O'Brien shook hands with some of the police through the window. The initial report to the Lord Lieutenant of Ireland stated that a constable fired the first shot at O'Brien, who was attempting to negotiate. General firing then ensued between the police and the rebels. O'Brien had to be dragged out of the line of fire by James Stephens and Terence Bellew MacManus, both of whom were wounded. As he tried to flee the district, William Smith O'Brien was arrested at Thurles railway station on 5 August. He and the other three leaders were found guilty of treason and were among the last people to be sentenced to 'hanging, drawing and quartering'. At the insistence of Queen Victoria herself, who thought the sentencing too harsh for the crime committed, they were transported to Australia.

== Amenities ==
On Ballingarry's main street, there is a church, primary school and shops. The nearby collieries of Ballingarry are historically associated with anthracite mining in Ireland.

== Economy ==
The area was the centre of an active coal-mining industry for nearly two hundred years. However, economic factors led to the demise of Ballingarry Coal Mines in the late 20th century. With the mining shafts now flooded and the associated infra-structure derelict or removed, there is little or no prospect of its revival.

== Sport ==
Ballingarry GAA club is the local Gaelic Athletic Association club and has a pitch in the village.
