= List of country houses in County Carlow =

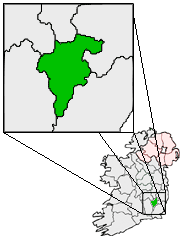
Location of County Carlow

This is a list of the historic "Big Houses" (Irish: teach mór) of County Carlow, Ireland. The term is a direct translation from Irish and refers to the country houses, mansions or estate houses of the historical landed class in Ireland.

This page lists 88 of the most prominent historic big houses in Carlow, which have adequate records associated with them. While many of these houses are currently in private ownership, they are still afforded varying degrees of protection by the Irish government based on whether their architecture or history is considered nationally, regionally or locally important.

At the height of the estates period in the 1800s, Carlow had a greater number of country houses and demesnes per hectare than any other rural county in Ireland. These "big houses" and their occupants dominated the economic and political landscape until the turn of the 20th century. Historian Jimmy O'Toole likens the prevalence of estates within the county to Gloucestershire, England, stating that Carlow was "the most gentrified county in Ireland".

The majority of these houses are listed within the National Inventory of Architectural Heritage (NIAH) and most of the remainder are registered as historic buildings by Carlow County Council. A small number of these houses are not currently listed on any register. This is usually due to significant alteration or demolition prior to the foundation of the NIAH in 1990.

== Gallery ==
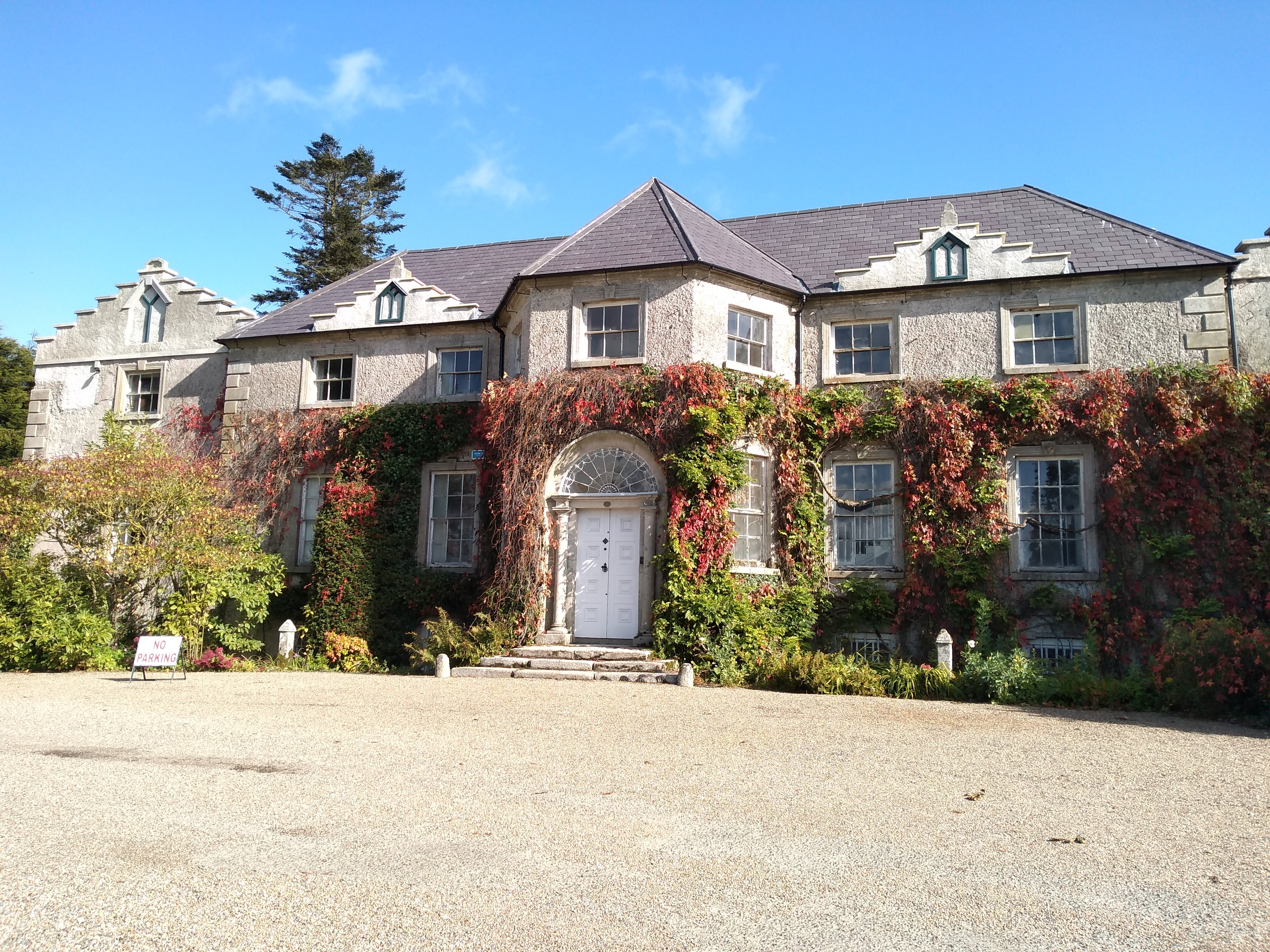
Altamont House,
Tullow

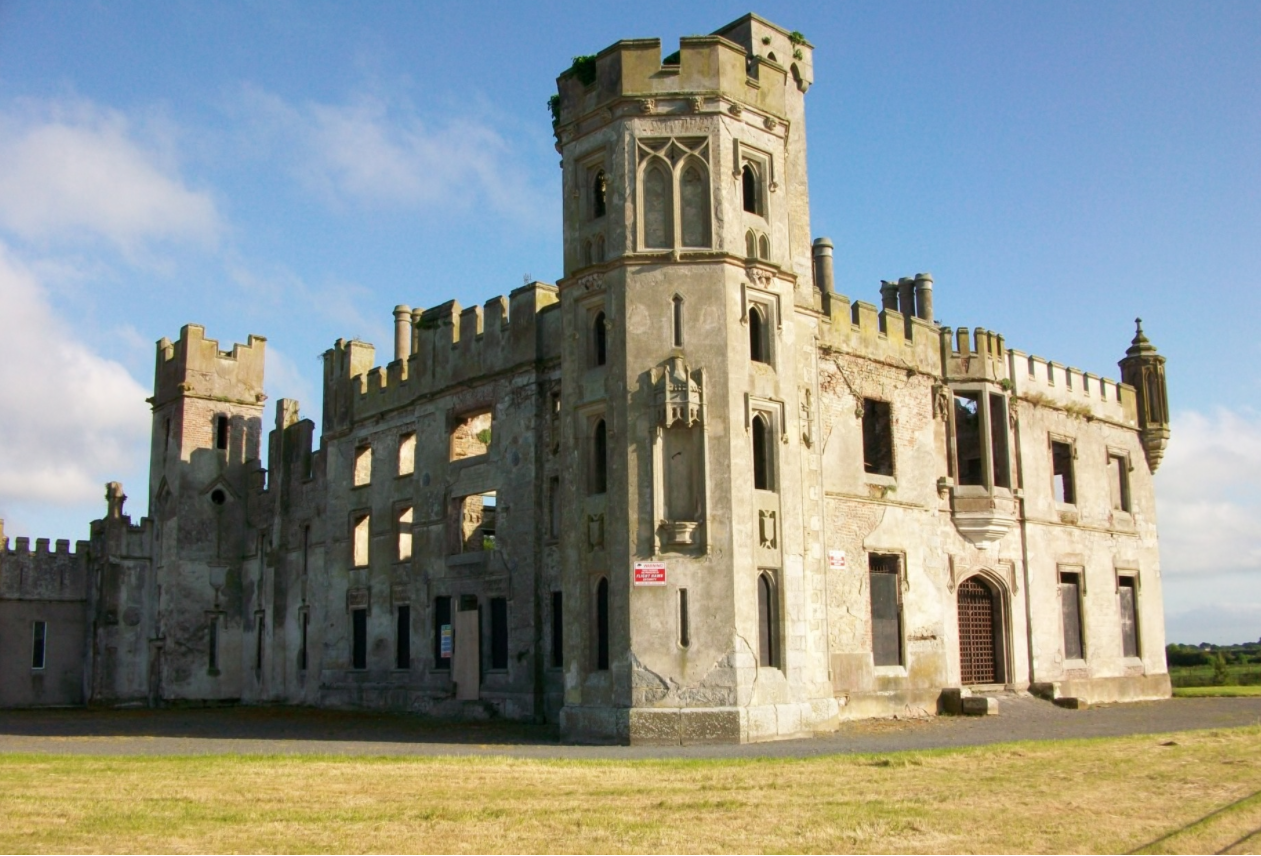
Duckett's Grove, Rainestown

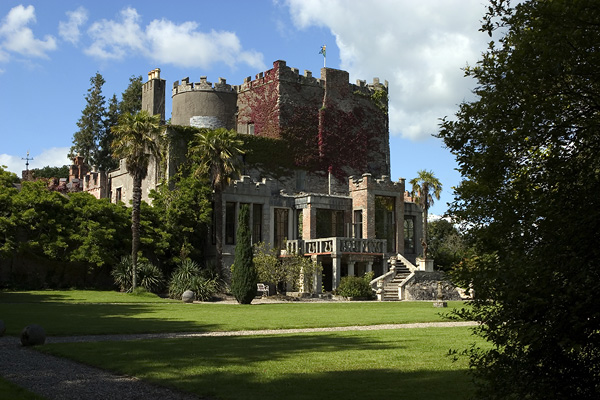
Huntington Castle, Clonegal

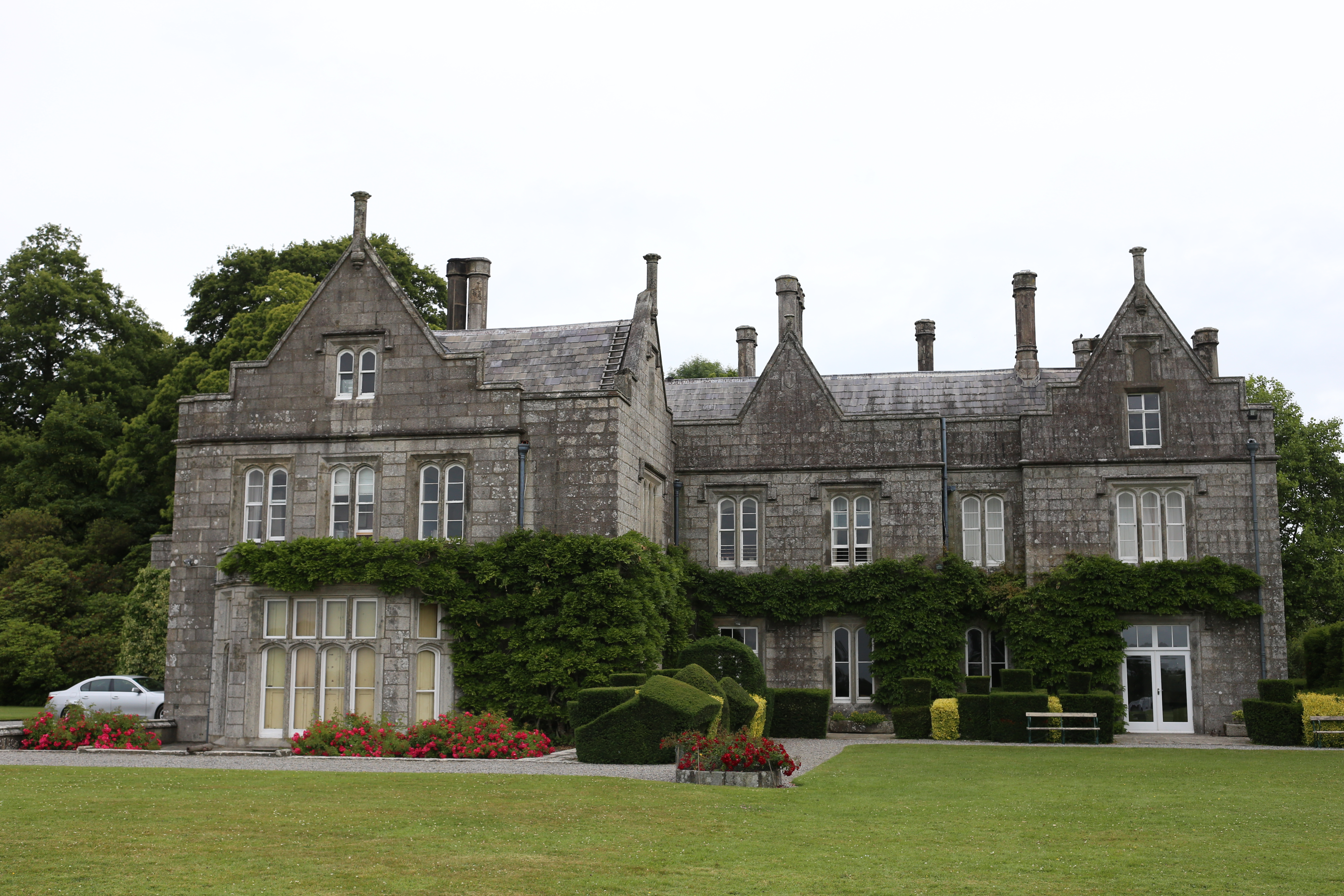
Lisnavagh House, Rathvilly

== Big Houses of County Carlow ==
Color key	Designation
	NIAH-listed, Nationally Important Building
	NIAH-listed, Regionally Important Building
	Protected by Carlow County Council
	Not currently on any local or national register

Register No.	Big House	Historic Family	Barony	Date Built	Status
CW169	Aghade Lodge	Roche	Rathvilly; 52.760003°N 6.730035°W	c. 1850; Extended 1875	Privately owned
10301326	Altamont House	St. George	Rathvilly; 52.735742°N 6.720918°W	1780	Publicly owned Reverted to State ownership in 1999.
CW96	Ardristan House	Unknown	Rathvilly; 52.782557°N 6.750210°W	c. 1800	Privately owned
10400614	Bagenalstown House	Bagenal	Idrone East; 52.704955°N 6.954884°W	c. 1785	Privately owned
10301201	Ballinabrannagh House	Hughes	Idrone West; 52.788378°N 6.981310°W	c. 1850; Remodelled 1910	Privately owned
CW107	Ballintemple House	Butler	Forth; 52.733734°N 6.993550°W	early 1700s Remodelled 1825	Burnt in 1917, demolished in 1975; Greek-style granite portico still stands
10301704	Ballinvalley House	Kealy	Forth; 52.731023°N 6.782150°W	c. 1800	Abandoned, ruin
	Ballybar House	Butler	Carlow; 52.783812°N 6.913737°W	c. 1850	Privately owned
CW118	Ballycormick House	Rothwell	Forth; 52.672795°N 6.933480°W	c. 1830	Privately owned
10301702	Ballydarton House	Watson	Idrone East; 52.712719°N 6.839967°W	c. 1830	Privately owned
	Ballyellin House	Blackney	Idrone East; 52.626615°N 6.974270°W	c. 1782	Privately owned
10301306	Ballykealy House	Lecky	Forth; 52.747117°N 6.780271°W	c. 1830	In use as a hotel
10301323	Ballynoe House	Ricky	Forth; 52.754622°N 6.723004°W	c. 1775 extended 1825	Privately owned
CW454	Beauchampville House	Beauchamp	Idrone East; 52.722272°N 6.941574°W	c. 1820	Privately owned
10300309	Beechy Park	D'Israeli	Rathvilly; 52.889020°N 6.728213°W	c. 1780	Privately owned
10300202	Bella Vista	Unknown	Carlow; 52.87076045°N 6.93284956°W	c. 1750; Extended 1790	Privately owned
10300729	Bennekerry House	Newton	Carlow; 52.81832005°N 6.87854695°W	c. 1700	Privately owned
10400802	Borris House	MacMurrough-Kavanagh	Idrone East; 52.598397°N 6.926456°W	pre-1700 Extended 1731	Privately owned
10301403	Broomville House	Butler	Forth; 52.75006778°N 6.68752165°W	c. 1815	Privately owned
10300724	Browne's Hill House	Browne	Carlow; 52.83147351°N 6.88305996°W	1763; Extended 1842	Privately owned
10301602	Burgage House	Vigors	Idrone West; 52.72442758°N 6.86699044°W	c. 1765	Privately owned
10300301	Burton Hall House	Burton	Carlow; 52.86037142°N 6.84531861°W	c. 1730	Privately owned Existing house is the west wing of the original house, which fell into decay and was demolished around 1900.
10300721	Busherstown House	Unknown	Carlow; 52.82495957°N 6.85116832°W	c. 1725; Extended 1830	Privately owned
10300843	Castlemore House	Eustace	Rathvilly; 52.80028617°N 6.7707606°W	c. 1675; Remodelled c. 1874	Abandoned, ruin Destroyed by fire in 1975
10300742	Castletown House	Kavanagh	Carlow; 52.79164745°N 6.88030048°W	c. 1750; Remodelled c. 1835	Privately owned
10300705	Clogrennan House	Rochford	Idrone West; 52.80818421°N 6.97248079°W	c. 1815	Ruin; Abandoned in 1923
10301913	Corries House	Rudkin	Idrone East; 52.65814492°N 6.89742997°W	c. 1730; Extended c. 1835	Privately owned
10300305	Duckett's Grove	Duckett	Carlow; 52.85745466°N 6.81380317°W	c. 1745; Extended c. 1845	Publicly owned, ruin Destroyed by fire in 1933
10301632	Dunleckney Manor	Bagenal	Idrone East; 52.71355524°N 6.93879728°W	1700s Remodelled c. 1850	Privately owned
10400601	Eastwood House	Henley	Idrone East; 52.701176°N 6.972937°W	1755; Extended c. 1840	Privately owned
CW97	Ellen Grove House	Unknown	Rathvilly; 52.789853°N 6.748307°W	Early 1700s Remodelled c. 1830	Privately owned
10300702	Erindale	Wellington	Carlow; 52.818584°N 6.946488°W	c. 1800	Privately owned
10300203	Evington House	Deane-Tanner	Carlow; 52.868303°N 6.926523°W	c. 1835	Privately owned
10301648	Fennagh House	Pack-Beresford	Idrone East; 52.698222°N 6.857050°W	c. 1840	Privately owned
10400509	Garrison House	Tyndall	Idrone East; 52.735882°N 6.977312°W	c. 1760; Restored in 1999	Privately owned
10301231	Garryhundon House	Butler	Carlow; 52.765820°N 6.920563°W	c. 1880	Privately owned
	Greenbank House	Haughton	Carlow; 52.841089°N 6.929031°W	c. 1820; Remodelled 1950	In use as a hotel (Seven Oaks Hotel)
10300842	Hardymount House	Eustace	Rathvilly; 52.799452°N 6.762522°W	c. 1820	Privately owned
10301620	Holloden House	Vigors	Idrone West; 52.703217°N 6.978733°W	c. 1755	Owned by the Royal Oak Distillery
10302001	Hollybrook House	Feltus-Burke	Forth; 52.671966°N 6.792423°W	c. 1765	Privately owned
10400710	Huntington Castle	Esmonde	St. Mullin's Upper; 52.690444°N 6.648942°W	c. 1625; Extended c. 1725 & 1880	Privately owned
10301237	Janeville House	Garrett	Idrone East; 52.734298°N 6.862969°W	c. 1750	Privately owned
10300718	Johnstown House	Bunbury	Carlow; 52.834891°N 6.850684°W	c. 1725; Renovated c. 1840	Privately owned
	Kilbride House	K'Eogh	Forth; 52.724387°N 6.718662°W	mid-1800s	Ruin; Destroyed by fire in 1927
10302236	Kilcoltrim House	Bruen	Idrone East; 52.596964°N 6.903482°W	c. 1750	Abandoned, ruin
10301701	Kilconner House	Watson	Idrone East; 52.723904°N 6.838763°W	c. 1650; Remodelled c. 1870 & 1985	Privately owned
CW330	Kilcumney House	Murphy	Idrone East; 52.635704°N 6.939933°W	c. 1840	Privately owned
	Kilknock House	Lecky	Forth; 52.754766°N 6.817430°W	c. 1840	Demolished in 1940, Gatehouse remains
CW359	Killedmond	Kavanagh	Idrone East; 52.613139°N 6.855158°W	c. 1850	Owned by Blackstairs Eco-Trails
	Kilgraney House	Unknown	Idrone East; 52.653744°N 6.957905°W	c. 1820	In use as a hotel
10301604	Killinane House	Mercer	Idrone West; 52.717109°N 6.982103°W	c. 1765	Privately owned
10300736	Kilmeany House	Loftus-Townshend	Carlow; 52.811858°N 6.887756°W	c. 1825	Privately owned
10302410	Knockduff House	King	St. Mullin's Lower; 52.520097°N 6.901091°W	c. 1750	Privately owned
10301234	Kyleballyhue House	Whelan	Carlow; 52.781058°N 6.866482°W	c. 1808	Privately owned
CW246	Lenham Lodge	Butler	Carlow; 52.780180°N 6.959515°W	c. 1815; Extended 1840	Privately owned
10300410	Lisnavagh House	McClintock-Bunbury	Rathvilly; 52.858390°N 6.681639°W	c. 1847	Privately owned
10300801	Littlemoyle House	Bunbury	Carlow; 52.806030°N 6.845136°W	c. 1865	Privately owned
10301640	Lumcloone House	Watson	Idrone East; 52.723142°N 6.852420°W	c. 1830	Privately owned
10400405	Milford House	Alexander	Idrone West; 52.779655°N 6.967148°W	c. 1820	Privately owned
CW142	Mill House	Lambert	St. Mullin's Lower; 52.561943°N 6.910987°W	c. 1870	In use as a restaurant
10301317	Millpark House	Echlin	Forth; 52.755473°N 6.731095°W	c. 1710	Privately owned
10300904	Minvaud House	Unknown	Rathvilly; 52.836150°N 6.561975°W	c. 1860	Privately owned
10302005	Mount Leinster Lodge	Kavanagh	Idrone East; 52.625320°N 6.819713°W	c. 1840	Privately owned
10301650	Mount Pleasant House	Harvey	Idrone East; 52.702104°N 6.850673°W	c. 1740	Derelict
10301313	Mount Wolseley House	Wolseley	Rathvilly; 52.791974°N 6.721541°W	c. 1890	In use as a golf clubhouse
	Myshall Lodge	Cornwall-Brady	Forth; 52.683681°N 6.782650°W	c. 1870	Demolished; Abandoned 1915, burnt down 1922
10301402	Newstown House	Cobden	Forth; 52.766383°N 6.683702°W	c. 1824	Privately owned
10300206	Oak Park House	Bruen	Carlow; 52.865642°N 6.913066°W	c. 1760	Publicly owned Headquarters of Teagasc
	Paulville House	Paul	Rathvilly; 52.83556°N 6.69861°W	c. 1870	Demolished
10300308	Philipstown Manor	Duckett	Rathvilly; 52.881650°N 6.749333°W	c. 1745	Privately owned
10300715	Pollerton House	Burton	Carlow; 52.846233°N 6.890798°W	c. 1750	Demolished 1970; Gatehouse, historic fencing remains
10300738	Rathcrogue House	Unknown	Carlow; 52.804261°N 6.877957°W	c. 1780; Remodelled c. 1840	Privately owned
CW453	Rathduff House	Bergin	Idrone East; 52.721293°N 6.941919°W	c. 1830	Privately owned
10300311	Rathmore House	Paul-Bunbury	Rathvilly; 52.855091°N 6.728435°W	c. 1785	Privately owned
10400502	Rathvinden House	McClintock	Idrone West; 52.740635°N 6.978858°W	c. 1810; Extended c. 1840	In use as a hotel
10301227	Rathwade Lodge	Beauchamp-Bartholomew	Idrone East; 52.743435°N 6.931142°W	c. 1835	Privately owned
CW291	Ravenswood House	Unknown	Forth; 52.666634°N 6.686426°W	c. 1825	Privately owned
CW506	Rocklyn House	Unknown	Carlow; 52.802885°N 6.900648°W	c. 1850	Privately owned
	Russelltown Park House	Unknown	Carlow; 52.854739°N 6.832472°W	1824	Demolished in 1950; Gatehouse remains
10301310	Sandbrook House	Echlin	Forth; 52.758517°N 6.760473°W	c. 1750	Privately owned
10301707	Sherwood Park	Baillie	Forth; 52.727328°N 6.722131°W	c. 1750	Privately owned
10300746	Springfield House	Unknown	Carlow; 52.825363°N 6.875786°W	c. 1815	Privately owned
10400328	St. Austin's Abbey	Doyne	Rathvilly; 52.799237°N 6.739136°W	1856	Ruin; Burnt in 1921
10300733	Staplestown House	Fishbourne	Carlow; 52.817490°N 6.883925°W	c. 1800	Privately owned
CW78	Straw Hall House	Heron	Carlow; 52.848043°N 6.924696°W	c. 1810	In use as an office
CW357	Thornville House	Fennell	Carlow; 52.861992°N 6.865005°W	c. 1840	Privately owned
10301647	Upton House	LaTouche	Idrone East; 52.705010°N 6.862336°W	c. 1840	Privately owned
10301631	Wykenham House	Bayliss	Idrone East; 52.714220°N 6.956321°W	c. 1840	Privately owned

== See also ==
- Destruction of Irish country houses (1919–1923)
- Irish National Land League
- List of historic houses in the Republic of Ireland
- Plantations of Ireland
- Protestant Ascendancy

== Bibliography ==
- O'Toole, Jimmy: The landed gentry in decline – A County Carlow perspective.
