= Vigor =

Vigor or vigour may refer to:

== Companies ==
- Vigor S.A., a Brazilian food company
- Vigor Marine Group, an American shipbuilding and ship repair company
- Vigor Gaming, a manufacturer of personal computers from 2004 to 2010
- Vigor Group, a Curaçao energy company

== Vehicles ==
- Honda Vigor, a premium car produced from 1981 to 1995
- Vickers VR180 Vigor, a British 1950s tractor

== Football clubs ==
- Vigor Lamezia, an Italian football club based in Lamezia Terme, Calabria
- FK Vigør, a Norwegian football club from Hellemyr, Kristiansand

== People ==
- Vigor (name), a list of people with the surname or given name

== Other uses ==
- Operation Vigour, a 1992 UK Royal Air Force operation – see List of Royal Air Force operations
- Vigor (software), a parody clone of vi for UNIX
- HTC Vigor, a codename for the HTC Rezound smartphone
- Vigor High School, a public school in Prichard, Alabama, United States
- Vigour (film), also called Kracht, a 1990 Dutch drama film directed by Frouke Fokkema
- Vigor (video game), a looter shooter video game by Bohemia Interactive
- Vigors, special abilities in the video game BioShock Infinite

== See also ==
- Vigors (disambiguation)
- Vigorous (disambiguation)
