= Disraeli (disambiguation) =

Benjamin Disraeli (1804–1881) was a British politician and writer who twice served as Prime Minister of the United Kingdom.

Disraeli or D'Israeli may also refer to:

== Arts and entertainment ==
- Disraeli (play), a 1911 play by Louis N Parker
- Disraeli (1916 film), a British silent film by Charles Calvert
- Disraeli (1921 film), an American silent film starring George Arliss
- Disraeli (1929 film), an American film starring George Arliss
- Disraeli (1978 serial), a 1978 British TV serial

== Places ==
- Disraeli, Quebec (city), Canada
- Disraeli, Quebec (parish), Canada
- Disraeli Glacier, Nunavut, Canada
- County of Disraeli, a cadastral unit in the Northern Territory of Australia

== People ==
- Disraeli (surname)
- Disraeli Lufadeju (born 1992), English basketball player
- D'Israeli (cartoonist), pseudonym of British cartoonist Matt Brooker

== Other uses ==
- Disraeli (horse), a British Thoroughbred racehorse
- Disraeli Freeway, another name for part of Winnipeg Route 42, a major Canadian road

== See also ==
- Dizraeli, stage name of British rapper Rowan Alexander Sawday
