= Ballykealy House =

Coordinates: 52°44′48″N 6°46′48″W

General information
- Type: Country House
- Location: Ballon, County Carlow, Ireland
- Construction started: 1825
- Completed: 1835

Ballykealy House is a 19th-century great house and former estate in Ballon, County Carlow, Ireland.

== History ==
Ballykealy House, sometimes spelt Ballykealey, was built between 1825 and 1835 for John James Lecky. It is a three-story Tudor revival house on a T-shape plan. It was designed by the English architect Thomas Cobden, who also designed a number of other great houses in County Carlow, including Duckett's Grove. The house once sat in an estate of 1,500 acres.

== Current Use ==
In the 1990s, the house was converted to use as a hotel, with an extension being added to accommodate this.

== See also ==
- List of country houses in County Carlow
