= Forth (County Carlow barony) =

Forth Fothairt (Irish)
- Barony
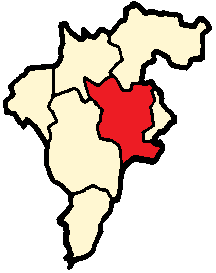
- Interactive map of Forth
- Country: Ireland
- Province: Leinster
- County: Carlow

Area
  - Land: 159.89 km^{2} (61.73 sq mi)

Forth (Irish: Fothairt) is a barony in County Carlow, Ireland.

== Etymology ==
Forth takes its name from the Irish Fortuatha, a term that described a region (tuath) not ruled by members of the dominant dynasty of a province. In this case, the region was known as Fothairt Mag Feá, "the fothairt of the plain of beeches."

== Location ==
Forth is found in the eastern part of County Carlow. Physical features include the Burren River and Mount Leinster.

Forth barony is bordered to the east by St. Mullin's Upper; to the north by Rathvilly; to the west by Idrone East; to the northwest by Carlow (all the preceding baronies are also in County Carlow); to the northeast by Shillelagh, County Wicklow; and to the southeast by Scarawalsh, County Wexford.

== History ==
Uí Nualláin (O'Nolan) were rulers of Fothairt Mag Feá.

== List of settlements ==
Below is a list of settlements in Forth barony:

- Aghade
- Ballon
- Myshall
