= Rathtoe =

Village in County Carlow, Ireland

Rathtoe Irish: Ráth Tó
- Village
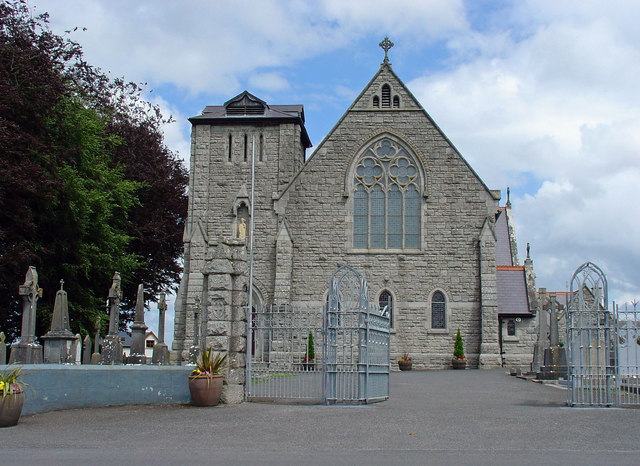
- St Patrick's church

- Location in Ireland
- Coordinates: 52.787°N 6.799°W
- Country: Ireland
- Province: Leinster
- County: County Carlow

Population (2022)
  - Total: 296
- Irish Grid Reference: S810712

Rathtoe (Irish: Ráth Tó), also spelled Rathoe, is a village and townland in County Carlow, Ireland. The village is located in the civil parish of Gilbertstown, between Tullow and Ballon, County Carlow. The Burren River flows through the area. Rathtoe is a census town, and had a population of 296 as of the 2022 census.

Evidence of ancient settlement in the area include the Bronze Age settlement of Ballon Hill (6 km to the south), and a ringfort (rath) within Rathtoe townland itself. The local Roman Catholic church is dedicated to Saint Patrick and was built c. 1890. The church is listed on the Record of Protected Structures for County Carlow, as is the nearby credit union building (formerly a school) which dates to 1837.

The local Gaelic football club, Fighting Cocks GAA, has its grounds approximately 2 kilometres (1.2 mi) west of the village. The club won the Carlow Senior Football Championship in 1938.
