= Burren River =

River in County Carlow, Ireland

Coordinates: 52.639000°N 6.783363°W

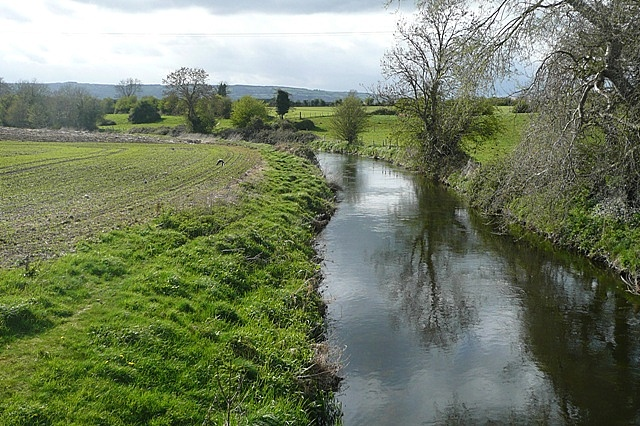
- View from Ballinacarrig Bridge
- Etymology: rocky land
- Native name: An Bhoirinn (Irish)

Physical characteristics
- Source
  - location: north face of Mount Leinster
- Mouth
  - location: River Barrow at Carlow
- Length: 39 km (24 mi)
- Basin size: 154 km^{2} (59 sq mi)
- Discharge
  - average: 0.476 m^{3}/s (16.8 cu ft/s)

The Burren River is a river in Ireland, flowing through County Carlow.

== Course ==
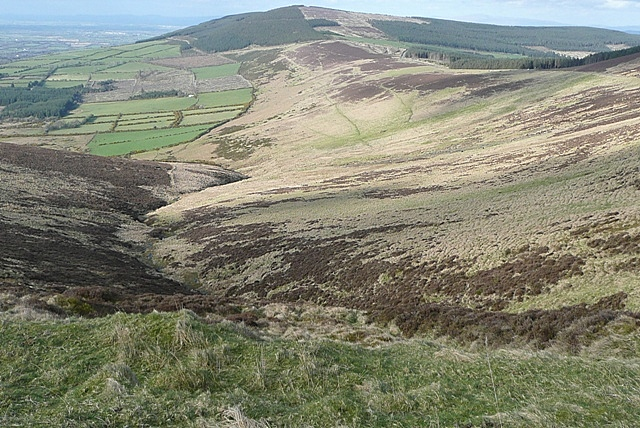
Headwaters of the Burren River on Mount Leinster.

The Burren River rises on the north face of Mount Leinster and flows northward under the R724 (Ullard Bridge, west of Fenagh) and under the N80. It continues northward through Rathtoe meeting the Aghalona River in Inchisland and turns westwards, passing under the M9 in Moyle Big. The Burren River goes under the N80 again at Ballinacarrig Bridge. It flows through the southern part of Carlow town and passes under the railway line, R448 and R417 (Burrin Street) and then drains into the River Barrow.

== Wildlife ==
Fish species include brown trout, three-spined stickleback, nine-spined stickleback, Atlantic salmon, stone loach, common bream, roach, perch and lamprey.

== See also ==
- Rivers of Ireland
