= Richie Kavanagh =

Irish singer-songwriter (born 1949)

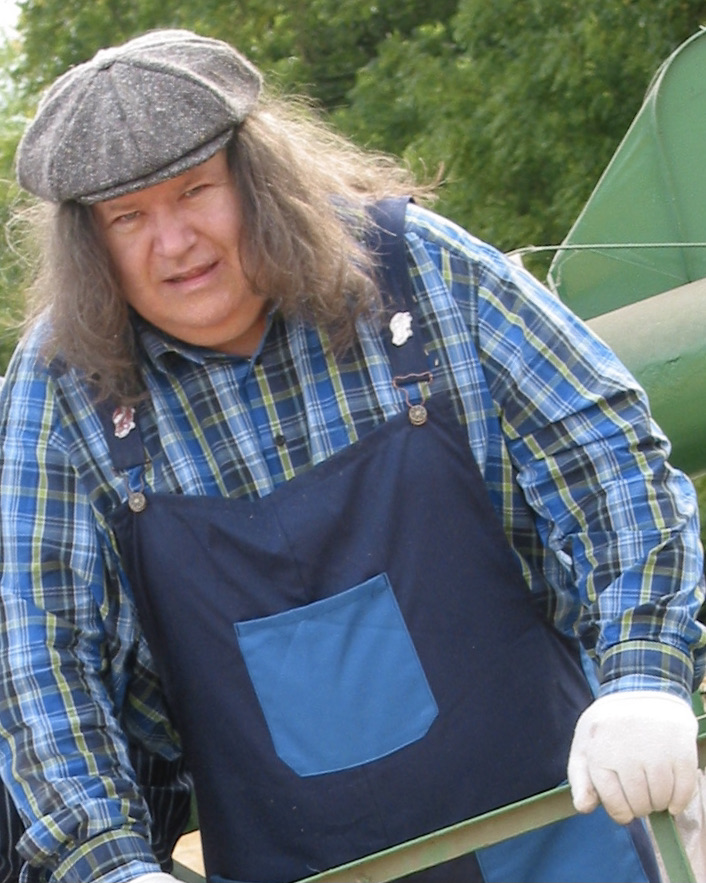

Background information
- Born: Richard Kavanagh; 19 March 1949 (age 77); Fennagh, County Carlow, Ireland
- Genres: Country and Irish, Comedy, novelty
- Occupation: Singer-songwriter
- Years active: 1970s–present
- Website: Official website

Richard Kavanagh (born 19 March 1949) is an Irish singer-songwriter.

Despite psoriasis crippling his hands, at the age of 44, he went on to become a singer-songwriter who wrote the song "Aon Focal Eile" which gained national attention in 1996. Tony Keogh in South East Radio was the first person to play the song and, after Gerry Ryan began playing it on his RTÉ 2fm national morning show, Kavanagh had a top-ten hit.

== Early years ==
Richie Kavanagh was born and raised in the Raheenwood area of Fennagh, County Carlow in Ireland where he still resides. Kavanagh's local parish of Myshall is also famous for producing the racehorse Danoli. Kavanagh was encouraged to write songs and sketches by one of his primary school teachers. His other major influence was the travelling road show which would visit his locality when he was a child. Richie loved the performances on the stage and used to go home and stand on the kitchen table and re-enact what he had seen.

Prior to his musical career, Kavanagh worked a number of jobs, such as lorry driver, ornamental fountain maker, and chef.

Richie started his career in the 1970s as a singer songwriter and started to write his own material. He was briefly involved in a double act called Dave and Dick before going solo. He had a hit song called "Face Her For Mount Leinster", and was establishing himself as a popular entertainer. At that time, his act included his alter ego 'Johnny' as part of his comedy routine. In 1991 his song 'Holey Ireland' about widespread potholes in Ireland enjoyed success on local radio with the New Ross Standard declaring it to be "number one in the south east". The popularity of this song led to him being referred to as 'The Pot Hole Man' up until the release of "Aon Focal Eile".

Kavanagh's stage costume, featuring gloves and a hat, were initially chosen to cover his psoriasis but became part of his trademark look.

== Musical success ==
By 1996 Kavanagh had established himself as a successful cabaret performer in the southeast of Ireland, selling out small venues and playing support to Niall Tóibín. In March 1996, Kavanagh was called by his son and advised that a song he had written and recorded a few years earlier, "Aon Focal Eile" had been played on Gerry Ryan's radio programme, only it was not Kavanagh's version but a cover by Noel Furlong. Kavanagh, along with his managers Tommy and Jimmy Swarbrigg decided to promote his own version of the song at this point, which he had previously disregarded as not one of his best. His promotion of the song emphasised that his version was the original.

The song became a cause célèbre in Ireland after it was banned by BBC radio stations and could only be played on other radio stations in the UK after midnight. The song included widespread use of the Irish word focal which hinted at the English profanity fuck, although it simply translates to word.

"Aon Focal Eile" featured in the top ten in the Irish charts for over six months including eight weeks as number one during 1996, keeping international hits such as Firestarter and Return of the Mack off the top spot during this time. In May 1996 Kavanagh had two albums ("Travellin' Man" and "Aon Focail Eile - 15 Best Comedy Songs") in the Irish top ten album chart at the same time.

He won an IRMA award for Best Single of the Year in Ireland for 1996. The single is currently the 15th-best selling single in Irish chart history.

His songs have often been a topic of controversy due to his explicit and risque lyrics, such as "A Ride On A Tractor", "Mickey's Buckin Ass", "My Girlfriend's Pussy Cat", "If I Didn't Get A Ride" and "My Wife, Johnny's Morris Minor". He has also had hits including "The Mobile Phone", "Stay Wut Her Johnny", "Chicken Talk", and "Mobile Phone".

On 9 February 2011, while being interviewed on the Sue Nunn Programme on KCLR Radio, Kavanagh announced he had been diagnosed with Parkinson's disease. Despite this, he vowed to continue performing.

== Critical Reception and Legacy ==
Musically, Kavanagh's combination of a Country and Irish sound with English double entendre driven music hall songs has been compared to Brendan Shine, particularly his hit "Do You Want Your Old Lobby Washed Down?".

Kavanagh's commercial breakthrough at the beginning of the Celtic Tiger at the same time as more polished Irish cultural exports such as Boyzone, The Corrs, and Riverdance is sometimes presented an example of Irish cultural cringe. However, Kavanagh's defenders argue that his "stage antics and two-fingered salute to establishment norms" are consistent with the punk ethos.

In 1996 Kavanagh was described as "the first entertainer to become a star through local radio" in the Irish Independent.

== Discography ==
=== Chart singles ===
Year	Single	Chart Positions
Year	Single	IRMA
1996	"Aon Focal Eile"	1
1997	"Mickey's Buckin' Ass"	11
1997	"The Mobile Phone"	8
2001	"Pussy Pussy Cat"	5
2002	"If I Didn't Get A Ride"	15
2003	"How's Your Whole Family"	29
2003	"If I Could Drink (500 Pints)" (featuring Big In Sweden)	21
