= Ráth Tó =

Ráth Tó is the Irish-language name for two places in Ireland:

- Rathtoe, County Carlow, a village
- Ratoath, County Meath, a commuter town
