= Rothwell =

Rothwell may refer to:

== Places ==
=== Australia ===
- Rothwell, Queensland, Australia

=== Canada ===
- Rothwell, New Brunswick, Canada

=== United Kingdom ===
- Rothwell, Lincolnshire, United Kingdom
- Rothwell, Northamptonshire, United Kingdom
  - Rothwell (Kettering ward)
- Rothwell, West Yorkshire, United Kingdom
  - Rothwell (UK Parliament constituency), a former constituency
  - Rothwell (Leeds City Council ward)

== People with the surname ==
- Annie Rothwell (1837–1927), Canadian novelist and poet
- Ben Rothwell (born 1981), American professional mixed martial arts fighter
- Ben Rothwell (boxer) (1902–1979), American boxer
- Caroline Rothwell (born 1967), English-Australian sculptor
- Edward Rothwell (c. 1844–1892), English-born Newfoundland merchant and politician
- Evelyn Rothwell (1911–2008) (Lady Barbirolli), oboist; wife of Sir John Barbirolli, orchestral conductor
- Frank Rothwell (born 1936), Irish weightlifter
- Geoff Rothwell (1920–2017), British bomber pilot
- Harry Rothwell, former Canadian football player
- Herbert Rothwell (born 1880), English footballer
- Jarred Rothwell, South African Muay Thai boxer
- Jerry Rothwell, British filmmaker
- Joe Rothwell (born 1995), English professional footballer
- Michael Rothwell (actor) (1936–2009), British actor
- Michael Rothwell (sailor) (born 1953), American sailor
- Naomi D. Rothwell (1917–2000), American statistician and halfway house director
- Dame Nancy Rothwell (born 1955), British scientist and vice-chancellor of the University of Manchester
- Nicolas Rothwell, Australian journalist and author
- Peter Rothwell (1920–2010), English WWII pilot
- Richard Pennefather Rothwell (1836–1901), Canadian-American civil, mechanical and mining engineer
- Richard Rothwell (painter) (1800–1868), Irish portrait and genre painter
- Sir Richard Rothwell, 1st Baronet (c. 1628–1694), English Member of Parliament
- Walter Henry Rothwell (1872–1927), English conductor
- Talbot Rothwell (1916–1981), English screenwriter
- William J. Rothwell (born 1951), American workplace researcher

== See also ==
- Rothwell, Hick and Rothwell, early 19th-century English engineering company
- Ruthwell, Dumfries and Galloway, Scotland
