= Loftus (surname) =

Loftus is an English surname. Notable people with the surname include:

- Adam Loftus (bishop) (1533–1605), Irish Archbishop, Lord Chancellor of Ireland, first provost of Trinity College, Dublin
- Adam Loftus, 1st Viscount Loftus (1568–1643), Lord Chancellor of Ireland in 1619
- Aisling Loftus (1990–), English actress
- Amy Loftus, American singer
- Cecilia Loftus (1876–1943), Scottish burlesque performer and actress
- Dudley Loftus (died 1616) (1561–1616), an Irish landowner and politician
- Elizabeth Loftus (born 1944), American psychologist and author
- Ernest Achey Loftus (1884–1987), English soldier, teacher and diarist
- Frederick Loftus (1799–1860), cricketer
- Hubert J. Loftus (1924–1995), American politician
- Jamie Loftus (born 1993), American comedian, writer, podcaster, and actress
- John Loftus (born 1950), American author, former US government prosecutor, and former Army intelligence officer
- Johnny Loftus (1874–1935), American boxing trainer
- Johnny Loftus (1895–1976), American horse racing jockey
- Joseph Philip Loftus, assistant director at the Johnson Space Center, Senior 1000 Government Official
- Lord Augustus Loftus (Lord Augustus William Frederick Spencer Loftus) (1817–1909), Governor of New South Wales, Australia 1879–1885
- Ruben Loftus-Cheek (born 1996), English football player
- Seán Dublin Bay Rockall Loftus (1927–2010), Irish barrister, politician, and environmentalist
- Thomas Loftus (1917–2011), former Chairman of Leinster Gaelic Athletic Association
- Tom Loftus (1856–1910), American professional baseball player and manager
- William Loftus (disambiguation)
