= John Loftus =

John Loftus may refer to:

- John Loftus (military author) (born 1950), military author and radio talk show host
- John Loftus, 2nd Marquess of Ely (1770–1845), peer and Member of Parliament in Ireland and the United Kingdom
- John W. Loftus (born 1954), atheist author and former minister
- Johnny Loftus (1895–1976), American jockey
- Johnny Loftus (1874–1935), American boxing trainer
