= Bunbury =

Bunbury may refer to:

== Places ==
- Bunbury, South Australia
- Bunbury, Western Australia
  - Bunbury (suburb)
  - Bunbury port, in Vittoria, Western Australia
  - Bunbury Airport
  - City of Bunbury, the local government area
  - Electoral district of Bunbury
- Bunbury, Cheshire, England

== People ==
- Bunbury (surname)
- Bunbury baronets

== Arts and entertainment ==
- Bunbury, a fictional character in Oscar Wilde's comedy The Importance of Being Earnest
- Bunbury, a fictional place in the Quadling Country of L. Frank Baum's Land of Oz
- The Bunburys, a short-lived supergroup including Eric Clapton and the Bee Gees
- Bunbury Music Festival, in Cincinnati, Ohio, U.S.

== Other uses ==
- HMAS Bunbury, two ships of the Royal Australian Navy
- Bunbury Festival (cricket), under-15 boys' tournament in England

== See also ==
- Bunburying
