= Lisnavagh House =

Country house in County Carlow, Ireland

Coordinates: 52.852°N 6.672°W

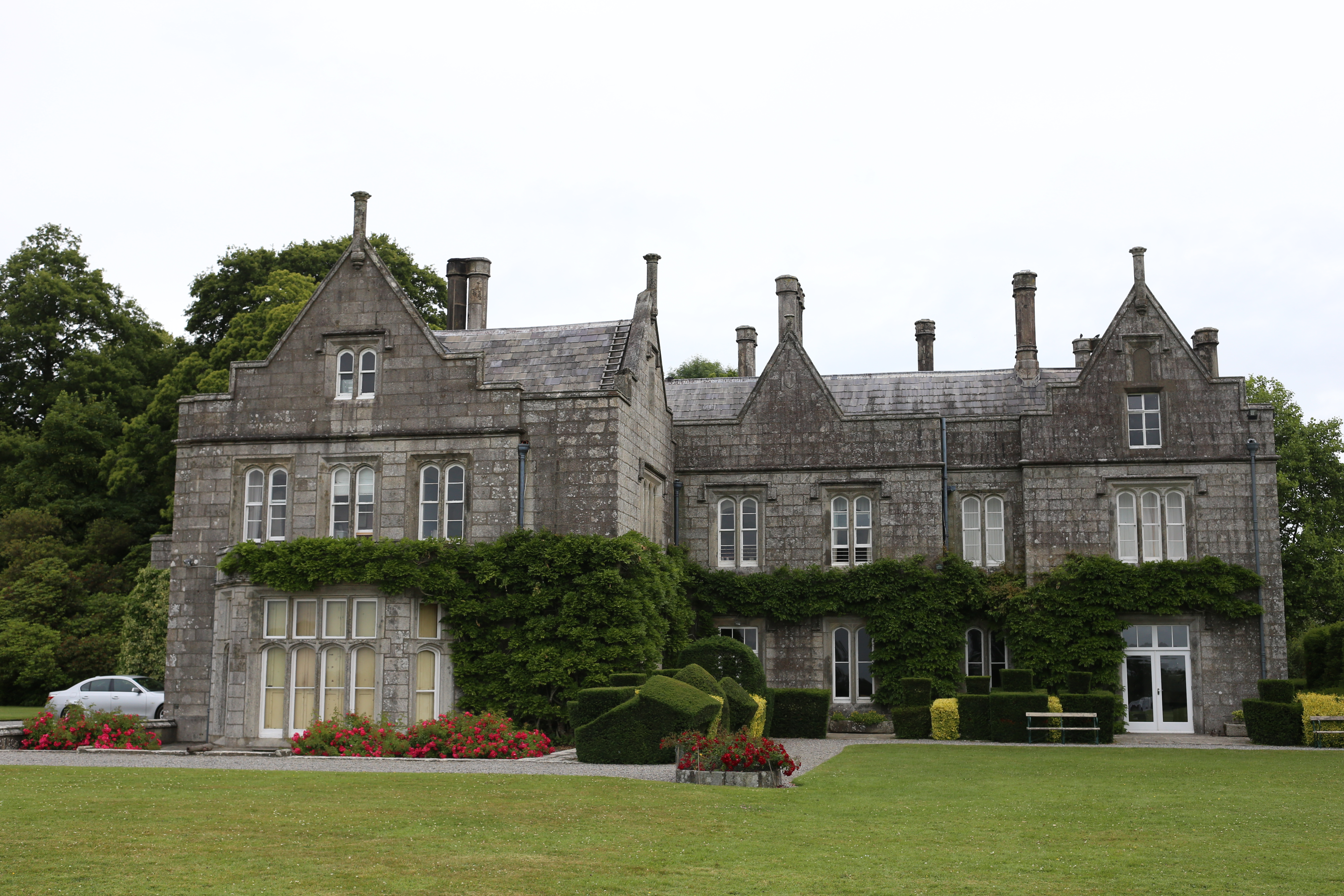
Front view of Lisnavagh House

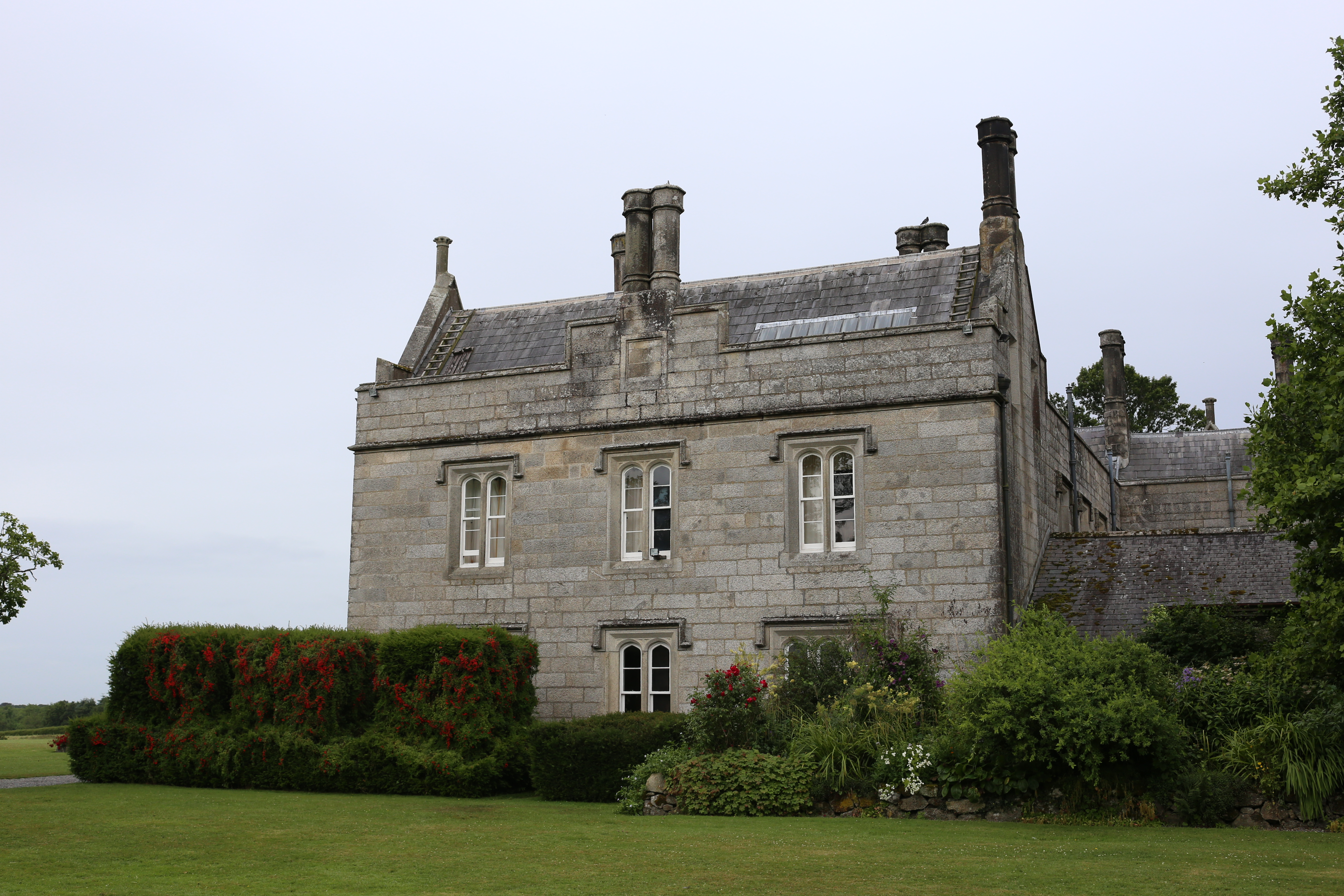
Side view of Lisnavagh House

Lisnavagh Estate is an estate house which lies outside the village of Rathvilly in County Carlow, Ireland. Lisnavagh is the family seat of the McClintock-Bunbury family, Barons Rathdonnell. A plaque in the present house states that the original house at Lisnavagh was built by William Bunbury in 1696. A map from the 1840 Ordnance Survey shows this in the parklands below the current house, with some modest farm buildings close by. The 1840 map also shows "Foundations of House" to the northwest, near the top of the hill, which is where a new house was planned but never completed. The new house was ultimately built nearer to the old house.

The Bunbury family claims descent from a Baron de St Pierre, a Norman knight who fought under William the Conqueror at the Battle of Hastings in 1066. This branch of the Bunbury family left England in the 1660s and moved to County Carlow as tenants of The 1st Duke of Ormond, from whom they rented the land at Lisnavagh. They purchased the property from the Ormonde Estate in 1702.

In 1847, during the Great Famine, William McClintock-Bunbury, commissioned Daniel Robertson to build a "New House at Lisnavagh". As well as the house, which was designed in the Gothic Revival style, Robertson also designed the gardens and pleasure grounds, as well as the farmyard about one mile away. The farm buildings were erected in the form of a double square, with smaller yards behind.

A contemporary account published in the Farmer's Gazette and Journal of Practical Horticulture reported that:

"The heavy works at Lisnevagh [sic] having been commenced and carried on during the famine years, came most opportunely to the relief of all classes of working people in the district, there having been from £300 to £400 paid weekly, for a considerable time, in the shape of wages alone ... Whilst Captain Bunbury has been improving his demesne, he has not been unmindful of the state of his tenantry outside. The greater part of the estate has been thorough-drained, at his expense, with the best possible effect. The various farm houses and offices throughout the property are also being overhauled, and in some cases nearly all new buildings have been, or are being, erected, whilst, in others, additions to, or alterations of, the existing buildings have been made. This is all done at Captain Bunbury’s cost, without charging even interest on the outlay; and we believe, in many cases, lowering the rents besides. Captain Bunbury is deservedly popular, both as a landlord, and throughout the country at large."

In 1952, approximately two thirds of the house was taken down and the house remodelled to take account of the reduction in house staff and the generally poor financial outlook at the time.

Daniel Robertson's gardens were later restored by Jessica, the Baroness Rathdonnell, whose husband, Ben Rathdonnell, the 5th Baron Rathdonnell (1938-2025), was the great-great-grandson of Captain McClintock-Bunbury. They are the parents of William, 6th Baron Rathdonnell (the present incumbent of Lisnavagh), as well as the landscape designer Andrew Bunbury, the historian and author Turtle Bunbury and the designer Sasha Sykes.

The current Dowager Lady Rathdonnell bred thoroughbred racehorses for the National Hunt, including Kildimo and Baydon Star. The stables where these horses were kept were converted into en-suite double rooms for guests who visit Lisnavagh.

In 2005, the house underwent a major renovation project, and was made available to hire for private events and weddings. Those to have married at Lisnavagh include chef Donal Skehan and his wife Sofie, and Richard Kearney, brother of Irish rugby players Rob and Dave Kearney.

== See also ==
- List of country houses in County Carlow
