= Fennagh, County Carlow =

Village in County Carlow, Ireland

Coordinates: 52.7147°N 6.8466°W

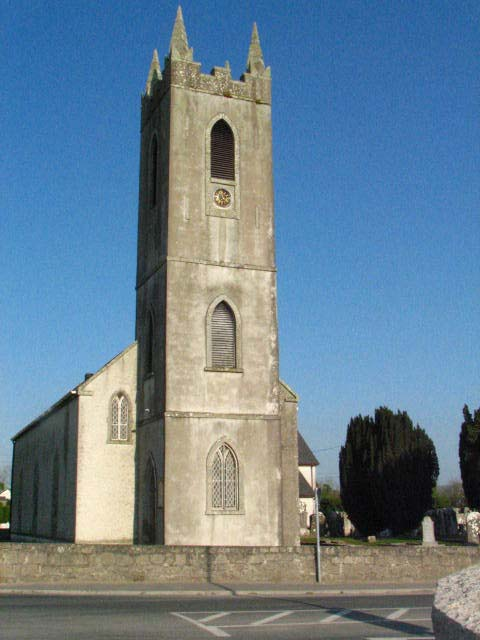
All Saints' Church, Fennagh

Fennagh, local name Fenagh (Irish: Fionnmhach), is a village, civil parish and townland in County Carlow, Ireland. 15 km south of Carlow town, it lies on the R724 road between Bagenalstown (Muine Bheag) and Myshall. The nearest town is Bagenalstown, 7.5 km to the west.

== Amenities ==
Fenagh village contains two public houses, The Hunter's Rest or "Joe's" and Kearney's, two shops, The Black Cat and Kearney's, a church, a community hall, and a creche.

== Sport ==
The local Gaelic football club, Fenagh GAA (Fiodhnach CLG in Irish) has teams from under 8s up to Senior level. The club, nicknamed the "Moll Bennetts", has won four Carlow Intermediate Football Championships and plays at J.J. Hogan Memorial Park.

== People ==
- Richie Kavanagh - entertainer

== See also ==
- List of towns and villages in Ireland
