= Idrone West =

Barony in County Carlow, Ireland

Idrone West Uí Dhróna Thiar (Irish)
- Barony
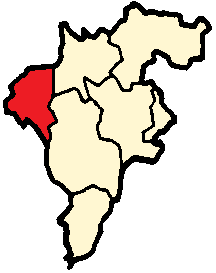
- Interactive map of Idrone West
- Country: Ireland
- Province: Leinster
- County: Carlow

Area
  - Land: 93.34 km^{2} (36.04 sq mi)

Idrone West (Irish: Uí Dhróna Thiar) is a barony in County Carlow, Ireland. The early barony of Idrone was split into East and West in 1799.

== Etymology ==
Idrone takes its name from the ancient name for the tuath, first recorded c. 1100 as Hua Drona in the Latin Vitae sanctorum Hiberniae. The Martyrology of Oengus the Culdee (c. 1150) calls it Huib Dróna in Middle Irish. The ruling family claimed descent from Drona, fourth son of Cathair Mór, a legendary 2nd century AD king.

== Location ==
Idrone West is found in the western part of County Carlow, west of the River Barrow.

Idrone West barony is bordered to the southeast by Idrone East; to the northeast by Carlow; (both the preceding baronies are also in County Carlow); to the west by Gowran and Fassadinin, County Kilkenny; and to the northwest by Slievemargy, County Laois.

== History ==
The Uí Bairrche and Ui Drona are cited early here. The O'Riain (Ryan) sept was Lords of Idrone. The Ó Dubhghaill (O'Doyle) clan of Viking origin was said to originate from a 9th-century King of Idrone.

== List of settlements ==
Below is a list of settlements in Idrone West barony:

- Leighlinbridge (western part)
- Oldleighlin
- Royal Oak

== Civil Parishes ==
Cloydagh (8 townlands)

Killinane (7 townlands)

Oldleighlin (25 townlands)

Tullowcreen (12 townlands)

Wells (9 townlands)
