= Thomas Bunbury =

Thomas Bunbury may refer to:

- Sir Thomas Bunbury, 1st Baronet (died 1682) of the Bunbury baronets
- Sir Charles Bunbury, 6th Baronet (Thomas Charles Bunbury, 1740–1821), British politician
- Thomas Bunbury (British Army general) (1783–1857), British soldier and colonialist
- Thomas Bunbury (British Army officer, born 1791) (1791–1861), service included Peninsular War, Australia, New Zealand and India
- Thomas Bunbury (bishop) (1830–1907), Irish clergyman
- Thomas Bunbury (MP) (1774–1846), Irish Conservative politician

== See also ==
- Bunbury (disambiguation)
