= R724 road (Ireland) =

Road in Ireland

R724 road
- Bóthar R724
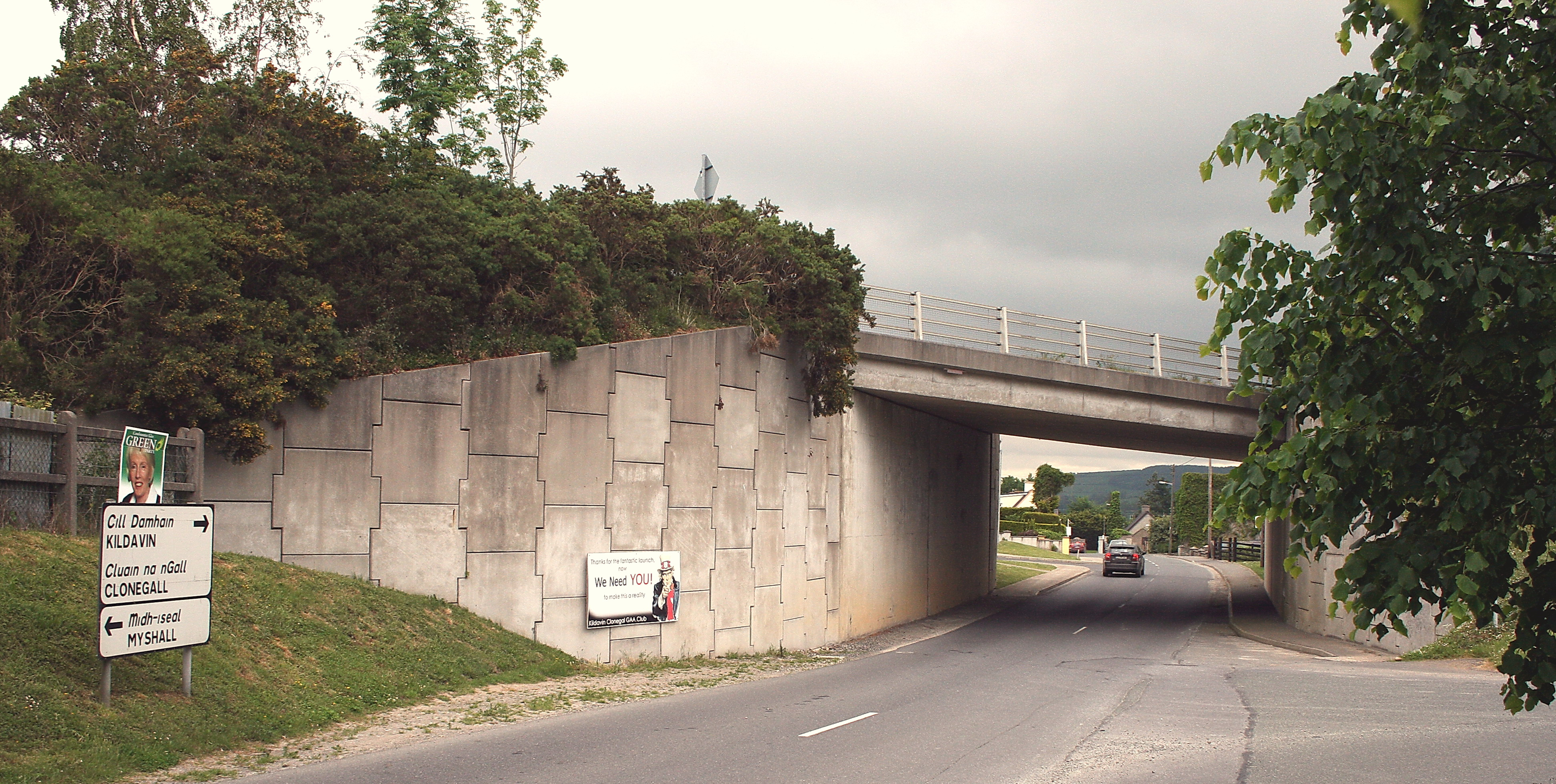
- R724 in Kildavin, under the N80

Route information
- Length: 25 km (16 mi)

Location
- Country: Ireland
- Primary destinations: County Carlow; Leaves the R448 at Royal Oak; Crosses the River Barrow at Royaloak Bridge; Bagenalstown – joins/leaves the R705; crosses the Dublin – Kilkenny railway line; Fennagh; Myshall; Kildavin, terminates at the N80 at a grade separated junction

Highway system
- Roads in Ireland; Motorways; Primary; Secondary; Regional

The R724 road is a regional road in County Carlow, Ireland. From its junction with the R448 at Royal Oak on the western edge of Bagenalstown Town it takes an easterly route crossing the River Barrow, the R705 regional road and the Dublin – Kilkenny railway line in the town.

It continues east to Fennagh and Myshall, before terminating in Kildavin at the N80. The entire route is within County Carlow. The road is 25 km (16 mi) long.

== See also ==
- Roads in Ireland
- National primary road
- National secondary road
