= St. Mullin's Upper =

Barony in County Carlow, Ireland

St. Mullin's Upper Tigh Moling Uachtarach (Irish)
- Barony
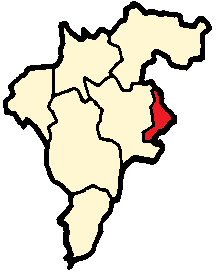
- Interactive map of St. Mullin's Upper
- Country: Ireland
- Province: Leinster
- County: Carlow

Area
  - Land: 32 km^{2} (12 sq mi)

St. Mullin's Upper (Irish: Tigh Moling Uachtarach) is a barony in County Carlow, Ireland.

== Etymology ==
The original St. Mullin's barony took its name from the village of St. Mullin's (Irish: Tigh Moling). The area now called St. Mullin's Upper was formerly an exclave until the two parts were separated in 1841.

== Location ==
St. Mullin's Upper is found in east County Carlow, east of the River Slaney and west of the River Derry. It does not border St. Mullin's Lower.

St. Mullin's Upper is bordered to the west by Forth, County Carlow; to the east and north by Shillelagh, County Wicklow; and to the south by Scarawalsh, County Wexford.

== History ==
Very early this area was referred to as Fearann Uí Néill, or the country of Farren O'Neale, lords of Tully. This may refer to the Uí Néill sept of Magh Dá Chonn in Leinster.

== List of settlements ==
Below is a list of settlements in St. Mullin's Upper:

- Clonegal
- Kildavin
