= Thomas Cobden =

Thomas Alfred Cobden
- Born: 13 April 1794; Chichester, United Kingdom
- Died: 27 November 1842 (aged 48); Upper Clapton, London
- Resting place: Abney Park Cemetery
- Occupation: Architect
- Known for: Architect of Cathedral of the Assumption, Carlow

Thomas Alfred Cobden (1794 – 1842) was an English architect, best known for designing many buildings in south-east Ireland, such as Cathedral of the Assumption, Carlow, Duckett's Grove and Browne-Clayton Monument.

== Life ==
Cobden was born in Chichester on 13 April 1794, the son of a builder Thomas Cobden and Mary Camp. Cobden had many siblings, as Thomas Cobden was a widower when he married Camp. Thomas Cobden the elder built Chichester Market House in 1807 with William Brooks, under the direction of John Nash. Nothing is known of Cobden's education, but it would appear he began in his father's trade as early as 1813.

Cobden married Ann Fleming at Westminster St James 14 September 1821, with whom he had at least five children. Due to his work in the area, Cobden lived in Carlow for some time, building a house on College Street. He lived in London from 1832, and was living in 14 Upper Clapton Terrace, Hackney when he died 27 November 1842. His cause of death was recorded as "consumption". Cobden is buried in Abney Park Cemetery, Stoke Newington, Middlesex.

== Works ==
It has been suggested that it was through his father's connections to Nash that Cobden began to get commissions in Ireland from the early 1810s. Cobden's work began with designs for Gurteen le Poer, County Waterford, for John William Power, and Wells House, County Wexford, for Robert Doyne. From 1835 to 1842, Cobden exhibited designs at Royal Irish Academy and the Royal Hibernian Academy.

For the majority of his career, Cobden's work was in County Carlow and Wexford, with many of his clients being members of the landed gentry. Some of the resultant buildings were Braganza built for Sir Dudley Hill, Duckett's Grove, Russellstown Park, and the Tudor-revival Ballykealy House.

In 1829, Cobden succeeded Joseph Lynch in overseeing the construction of the Cathedral of the Assumption in Carlow town. Cobden took much of his inspiration from Europe, in particular the Beffroi Tower in Bruges. This was just one of many churches Cobden was involved in designing, others include a Catholic church at Killeshin, and the Presbyterian church 'Scots' church' in Carlow town.
