= Altamont House =

Historic house and gardens in County Carlow, Ireland

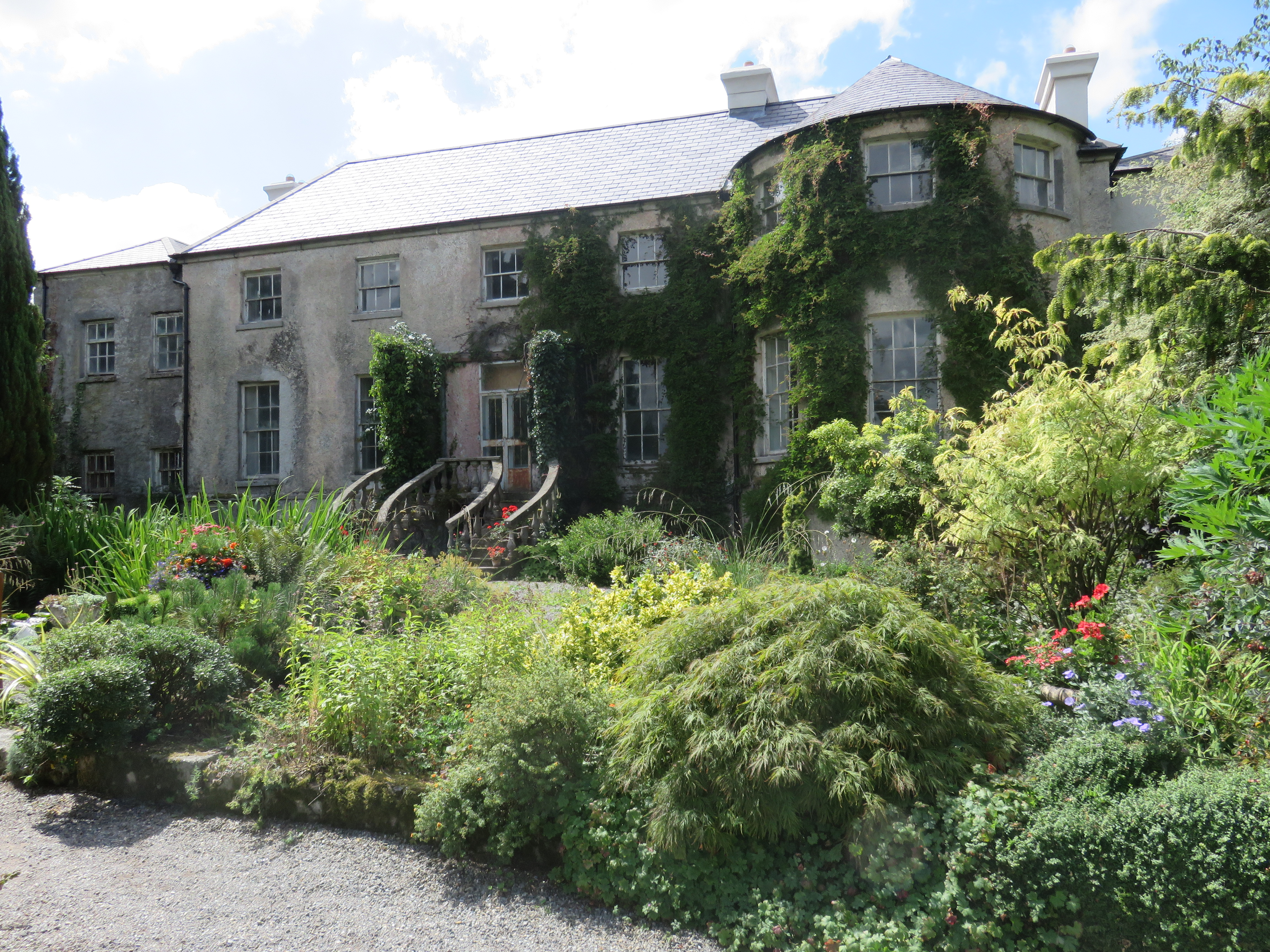
- Interactive map of the Altamont House area

General information
- Type: Country House
- Location: Tullow, County Carlow, Ireland
- Construction started: 1740
- Completed: 1780
- Owner: Government of Ireland

Website
- http://heritageireland.ie/visit/places-to-visit/altamont-gardens/

Altamont House is a historic building best known for its ornamental gardens in County Carlow. The Robinsonian-style gardens are often referred to as "the jewel in Ireland's gardening crown".

== History ==
The early origins of the house are unclear, with some claiming that the building was first built as a convent, perhaps dating as far back as the 16th century. The central section of the house dates from the 18th century and the sections that face the east remain unchanged, were built by the St George family. Most of these changes to the house were to reverse it to face a newly built road. During the 1780s, Benjamin Burton Doyle the High Sheriff of Carlow lived at the house. In the 1840s the Dawson Borrer family refurbished and altered the house and gardens, adding the lake that was dug as relief work for the local population during the Irish famine.

Feilding Lecky Watson bought Altamont in 1923, and proceeded to extend and expand the gardens. Watson's interest was primarily in rhododendrons, planting seedlings from around the world and exchanging specimens with Sir Frederick Moore of the National Botanic Gardens. Following Watson's death in 1943, his daughter, Corona North continued her father's horticultural work.

== Gardens ==
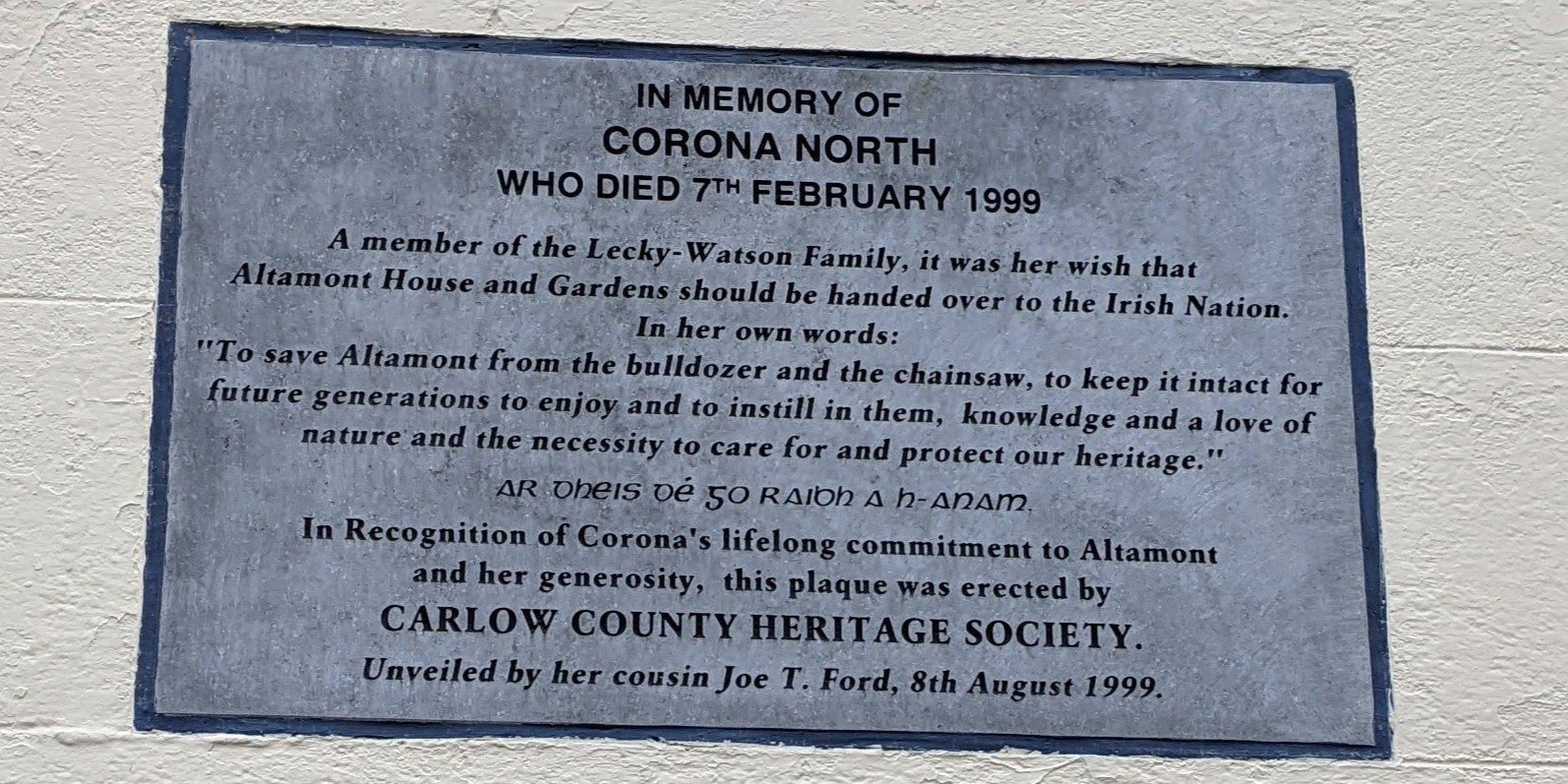
Plaque to Corona North in Carlow town

The garden sits on the banks of River Slaney which includes an ice age glen, bog garden and arboretum, with view of the Blackstairs Mountains, Wicklow Mountains and Mount Leinster. Some of the oaks are believed to be over 500 years old, and the varying environments provide habitats for diverse set of wildlife. The garden is home to a variety of rare azaleas, rhododendrons, magnolias, as well as wild bluebells and snowdrops. The gardens also feature a Wellingtonia, the Sequoiadendron giganteum or Giant Redwood, which was planted to commemorate the Battle of Waterloo.

A trust was set up in the early 1990s to preserve the estate of 100 acres. Following the death of Corona North, ownership of the house and gardens was transferred to the Irish State, and is operated by the Office of Public Works.

== Gallery ==
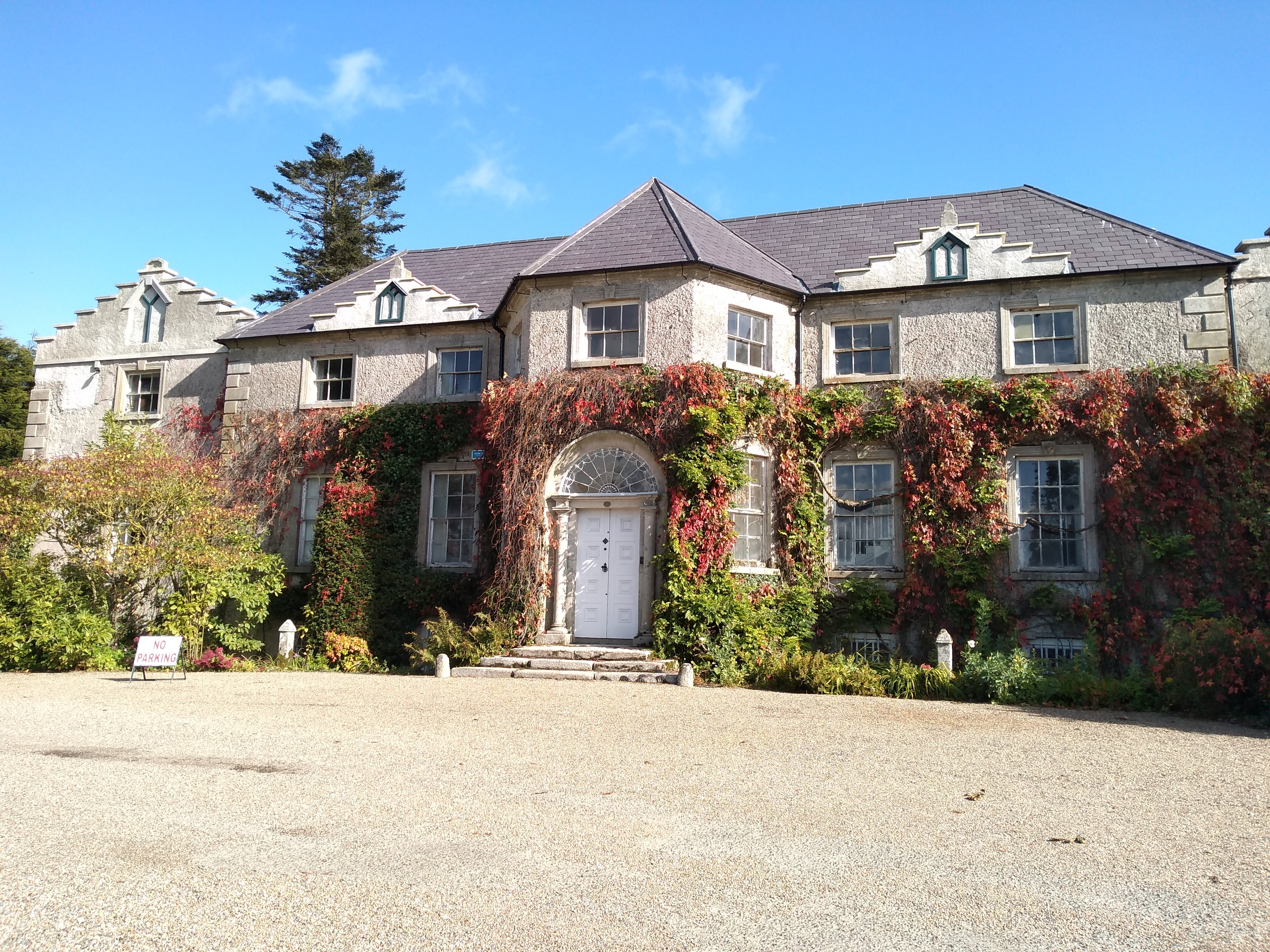
The front of the house

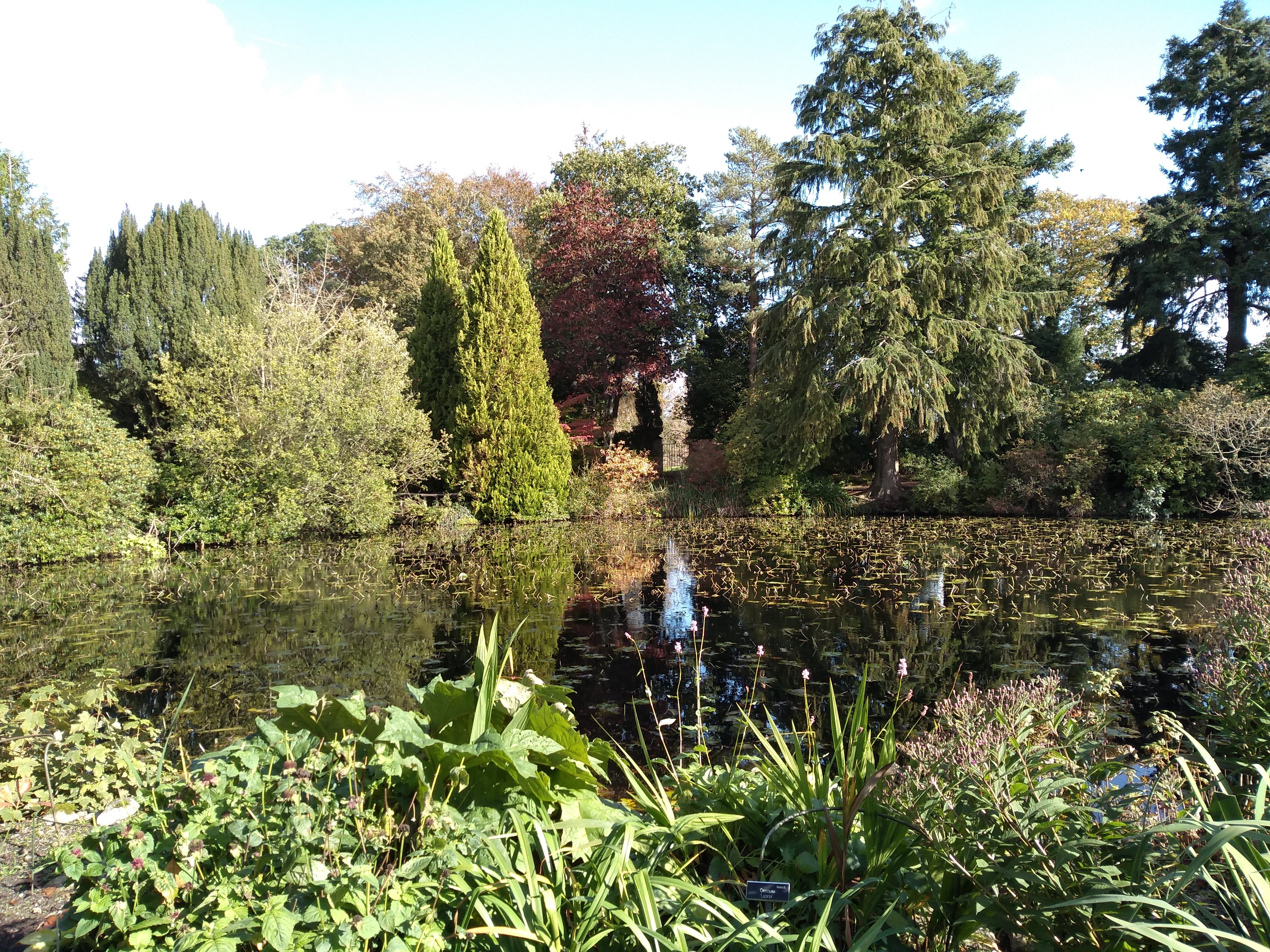
The lake

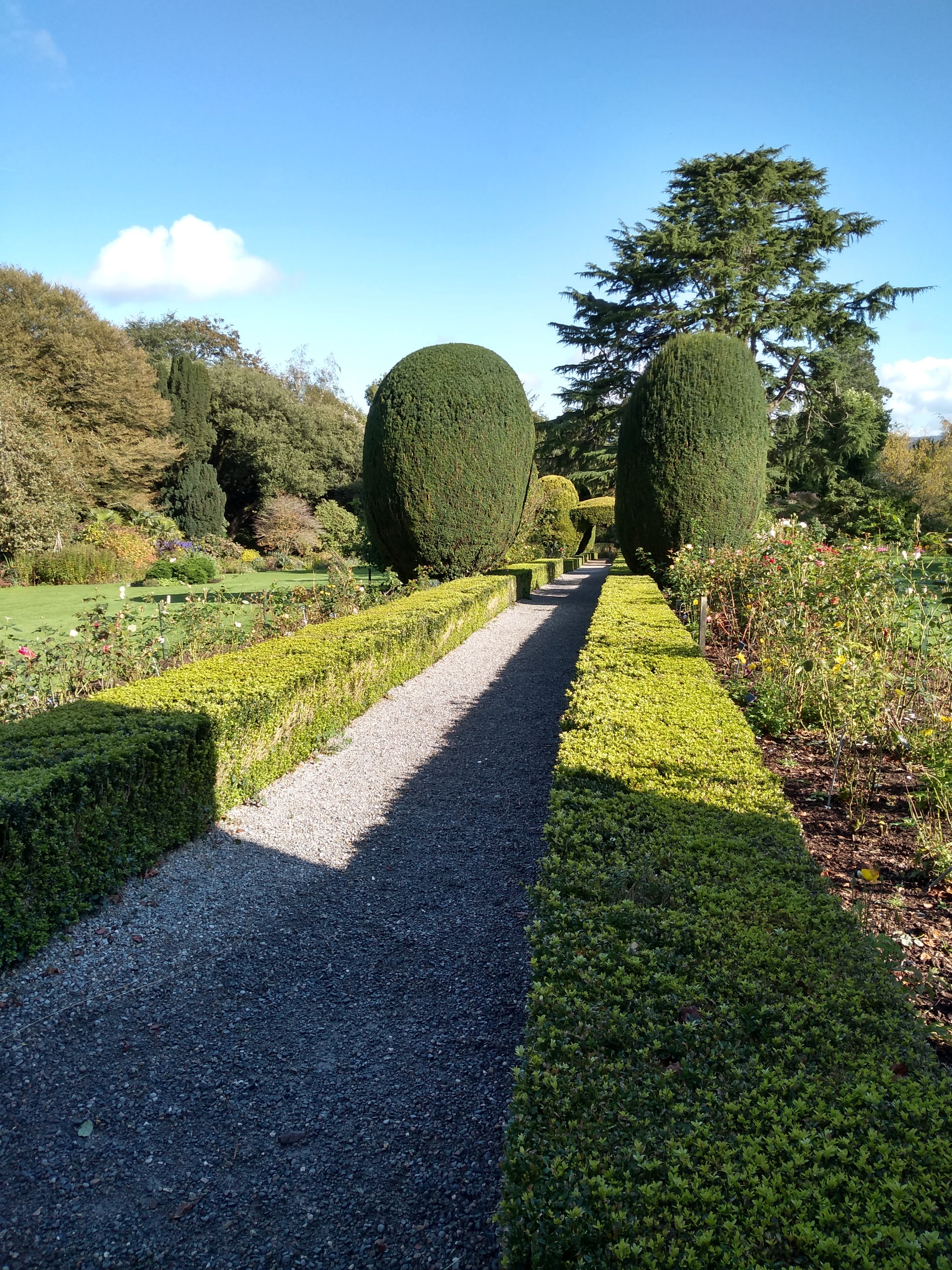
The Broadwalk

== See also ==
- List of country houses in County Carlow
- List of tourist attractions in Ireland
