= Disraeli (surname) =

Disraeli or D'Israeli is a surname, and may refer to:

- Benjamin Disraeli (1804–1881), British Prime Minister
- Benjamin D'Israeli (merchant) (1730–1816), British financier and merchant
- Coningsby Disraeli (1867–1936), British politician
- Isaac D'Israeli (1766–1848), British writer, scholar and man of letters; father of Benjamin Disraeli
- Mary Anne Disraeli (1792–1872), British peeress, wife of Benjamin Disraeli
- Ryan Disraeli, American businessman
