= Disraeli Glacier =

Glacier in Nunavut, Canada

Coordinates: 82°26′N 073°00′W

Disraeli Glacier is a glacier on northern Ellesmere Island, Nunavut, Canada. It lies in Quttinirpaaq National Park, South-West of the Disraeli Fiord. It is believed to have been named after Benjamin Disraeli, a British politician in the mid 1800s.

== See also ==
- List of glaciers
