= Bunbury (surname) =

Bunbury is a surname. Notable people with the surname include:

- Alex Bunbury (born 1967), former Canadian association footballer
- Sir Edward Bunbury, 9th Baronet (1811–1895), British Liberal Party politician
- Enrique Bunbury, (born 1967) Spanish singer-songwriter
- Henry William Bunbury (1750–1811), English caricaturist
- Henry William St Pierre Bunbury (1812–1875), British army officer, namesake of Bunbury, Western Australia
- Sir Henry Bunbury, 7th Baronet (1778–1860), British soldier and historian
- Kylie Bunbury (born 1989), Canadian-American actress
- Teal Bunbury (born 1990), Canadian-born American soccer player
- Thomas Bunbury (disambiguation), several people by this name
- Turtle Bunbury, (born 1972) historian and author based in Ireland

== See also ==
- Bunbury baronets
- Richardson-Bunbury baronets
