= Doyne =

Doyne is a surname. Notable people with the surname include:

- Cory Doyne (born 1981), Major League Baseball pitcher who is currently in the Washington Nationals organization
- John Doyne (1912–1997), Wisconsin politician and the first County Executive of Milwaukee County, Wisconsin
- Maggie Doyne (born 1987), American philanthropist who has built an orphanage, women's centre and school in the Kopila Valley of Nepal
- Philip Doyne (1886–1959), British fencer
- Robert Walter Doyne (1857–1916), British ophthalmologist
- Sir Robert Doyne (1651–1733), member of the Irish House of Commons, and later a distinguished judge
- Geoffrey Doyne Adams KCMG OBE (born 1957), member of the British Diplomatic Service
- J. Doyne Farmer (born 1952), American physicist and entrepreneur, with interests in chaos theory, complexity and econophysics
- William Thomas Doyne (1822–1877), Irish engineer active in the Crimean War

== See also ==
- O Doyne manuscript, collection of material relating to a dispute among the Gaelic-Irish family of Ó Duinn
- Ardoyne
- Dyne
- Oyne
