= William Loftus =

William Loftus may refer to:

- William Loftus (archaeologist), British geologist, naturalist, explorer and archaeological excavator
- William Loftus (British Army officer), British Army officer and Member of Parliament
- William Loftus (Canadian football), Canadian football player
