= Idrone East =

Barony in County Carlow, Ireland

Idrone East Uí Dhróna Thoir (Irish)
- Barony
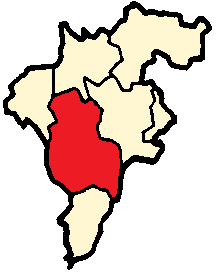
- Interactive map of Idrone East
- Country: Ireland
- Province: Leinster
- County: Carlow

Area
  - Land: 213.9 km^{2} (82.6 sq mi)

Idrone East (Irish: Uí Dhróna Thoir) is a barony in County Carlow, Ireland. The early barony of Idrone was split into East and West in 1799.

== Etymology ==
Idrone takes its name from the ancient name for the tuath, first recorded c. 1100 as Hua Drona in the Latin Vitae sanctorum Hiberniae. The Martyrology of Oengus the Culdee (c. 1150) calls it Huib Dróna in Middle Irish. The ruling family claimed descent from Drona, fourth son of Cathair Mór, a legendary 2nd century AD king.

== Location ==
Idrone East is found in the central part of County Carlow, east of the River Barrow.

Forth barony is bordered to the south by St. Mullin's Lower; to the east by Forth; to the west by Idrone West; to the north by Carlow (all the preceding baronies are also in County Carlow); to the southwest by Gowran, County Kilkenny; and to the southeast by Scarawalsh and Bantry, County Wexford.

== History ==
The Uí Bairrche and Ui Drona are cited early here. The O'Riain (Ryan) sept were Lords of Idrone. The Ó Dubhghaill (O'Doyle) clan of Viking origin was said to originate from a 9th-century King of Idrone.

== List of settlements ==
Below is a list of settlements in Idrone East barony:

- Ballinkillin
- Borris
- Leighlinbridge (eastern part)
- Nurney
- Bagenalstown
