= Vigorous =

Vigorous may refer to:

- Operation Vigorous, a Second World War Allied operation involving escorting a supply convoy to Malta
- HMS Vigorous (P74), a British Second World War submarine
- USCGC Vigorous (WMEC-627), a United States Coast Guard cutter
