= Disraeli Lufadeju =

English basketball player

Personal information
- Born: March 5, 1992 (age 34) New Brunswick, New Jersey, USA
- Listed height: 6 ft 1 in (1.85 m)
- Listed weight: 186 lb (84 kg)

Career information
- High school: The Canterbury Academy
- College: University of Worcester
- NBA draft: 2014: undrafted
- Playing career: 2013–present
- Position: Point guard

Career history
- 2011-2013: Kent Crusaders
- 2013–2016: Worcester Wolves
- 2016-2017: Leeds Force
- 2017-2018: Bradford Dragons
- 2018-2021: Cheshire Phoenix
- 2021-present: St Helens Saints

Career highlights
- BBL Play Offs Winner 2013/2014; BBL Trophy Winner 2013/2014

Disraeli Lufadeju (born March 5, 1992) is an English professional basketball player.
