= Carlow (barony) =

Carlow Ceatharlach (Irish)
- Barony
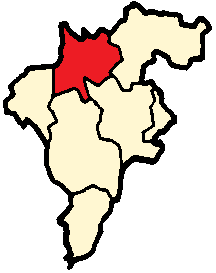
- Interactive map of Carlow
- Country: Ireland
- Province: Leinster
- County: Carlow

Area
  - Land: 126.9 km^{2} (49.0 sq mi)

Carlow (Irish: Ceatharlach) is a barony in County Carlow, Ireland.

== Etymology ==
Carlow barony takes its name from the town of Carlow (Irish: Ceatharlach, of disputed meaning).

== Location ==
Carlow barony is bordered to the east by Rathvilly; to the southeast by Forth; to the south by Idrone East; to the southeast by Idrone West (all the preceding baronies are also in County Carlow); to the north by Kilkea and Moone, County Kildare; and to the northwest by Slievemargy, County Laois.

== History ==
The Uí Bairrche are noted early in this barony. The O'Dolans were hereditary brehons of Leinster and sited here.

== List of settlements ==
Below is a list of settlements in Carlow barony:

- Carlow
