= Vigor Group =

Curaçao-based energy company

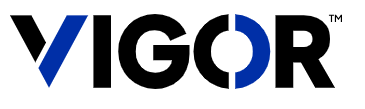
- Industry: Energy

Vigor is a private energy company headquartered in Hong Kong. Vigor was founded by Qatari entrepreneur Ghanim Saad Al Saad under the name Oryx Group.

== History ==
VIGOR was founded by Qatari entrepreneur Ghanim Saad Al Saad under the name Oryx Group.

The company initially concentrated on investments in the energy sector, gradually expanding its presence through acquisitions and partnerships across multiple markets.

In July 2024, Vigor entered into a 30-year lease agreement with 2BAYS Curaçao, granting the company operational control over the Emmastad refinery and the Bullenbaai terminal. In May 2025, the company rebranded as Vigor.

Vigor operates in Curaçao at the Emmastad refinery and the Bullenbaai terminal.

== Offices ==
Beyond Curaçao, VIGOR also has offices in Hong Kong and Barbados.
