= Kildavin =

Kildavin Cill Damháin
- Village
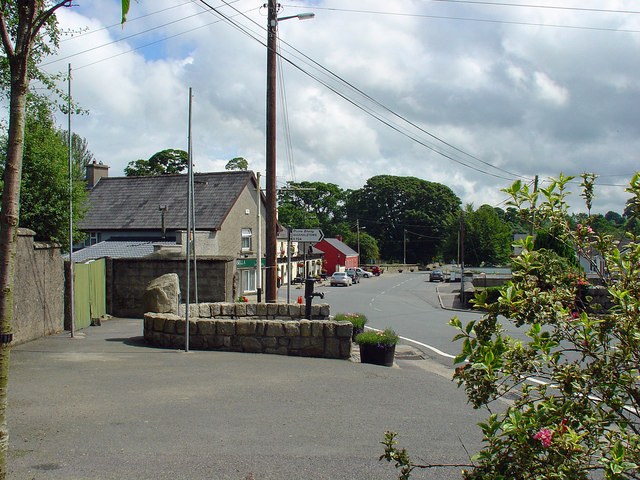

- Location in Ireland
- Coordinates: 52°41′02″N 6°41′10″W
- Country: Ireland
- Province: Leinster
- County: Carlow
- Barony: St. Mullin's Upper
- Time zone: UTC+0 (WET)
  - Summer (DST): UTC-1 (IST (WEST))

Kildavin (Irish: Cill Damháin) is a small village in County Carlow, Ireland and belongs to Clonegal parish. Situated on at the junction of the N80 national secondary road and the R724 regional road, it lies 5 km north of Bunclody, County Wexford at the northern end of the Blackstairs Mountains.

== Fauna ==
The River Slaney at Kildavin is one of a limited number of places in Ireland where the rare goosander is seen in winter. Examples of yellowhammer (an increasingly rare songbird in Ireland) and the great spotted woodpecker have also been seen here.

== See also ==
- List of towns and villages in Ireland
