= Rudkin =

Rudkin is a surname. Notable people with the surname include:

- Alan Rudkin (1941–2010) British, Commonwealth, and European bantamweight boxer
- Charles Rudkin (1872–1957), British soldier, barrister and politician
- David Rudkin (born 1936), English playwright
- Ethel Rudkin (1893–1985), English historian, archaeologist, and folklorist
- Filipp Rudkin (1893–1954), Belarusian Soviet Army major general
- Frank H. Rudkin (1864–1931), American judge
- Isabella Rudkin (born c.1821/3 – 1888) , Anglo-Irish child musical prodigy
- Jon Rudkin (born 1968), English football coach
- Margaret Rudkin (1897–1967), American business executive
- Mark Rudkin, British soldier
- Tommy Rudkin (1919–1969), English professional footballer
