= Vigors =

Vigors is a surname, and may refer to:

- Bartholomew Vigors (1644–1721), Anglican priest in Ireland
- Nicholas Aylward Vigors (1785–1840), Irish zoologist and politician
- Tim Vigors (1922–2003), British fighter ace, founder of the Coolmore Stud

== See also ==
- Vigor (name)
