= Jarred Rothwell =

South African Muay Thai boxer

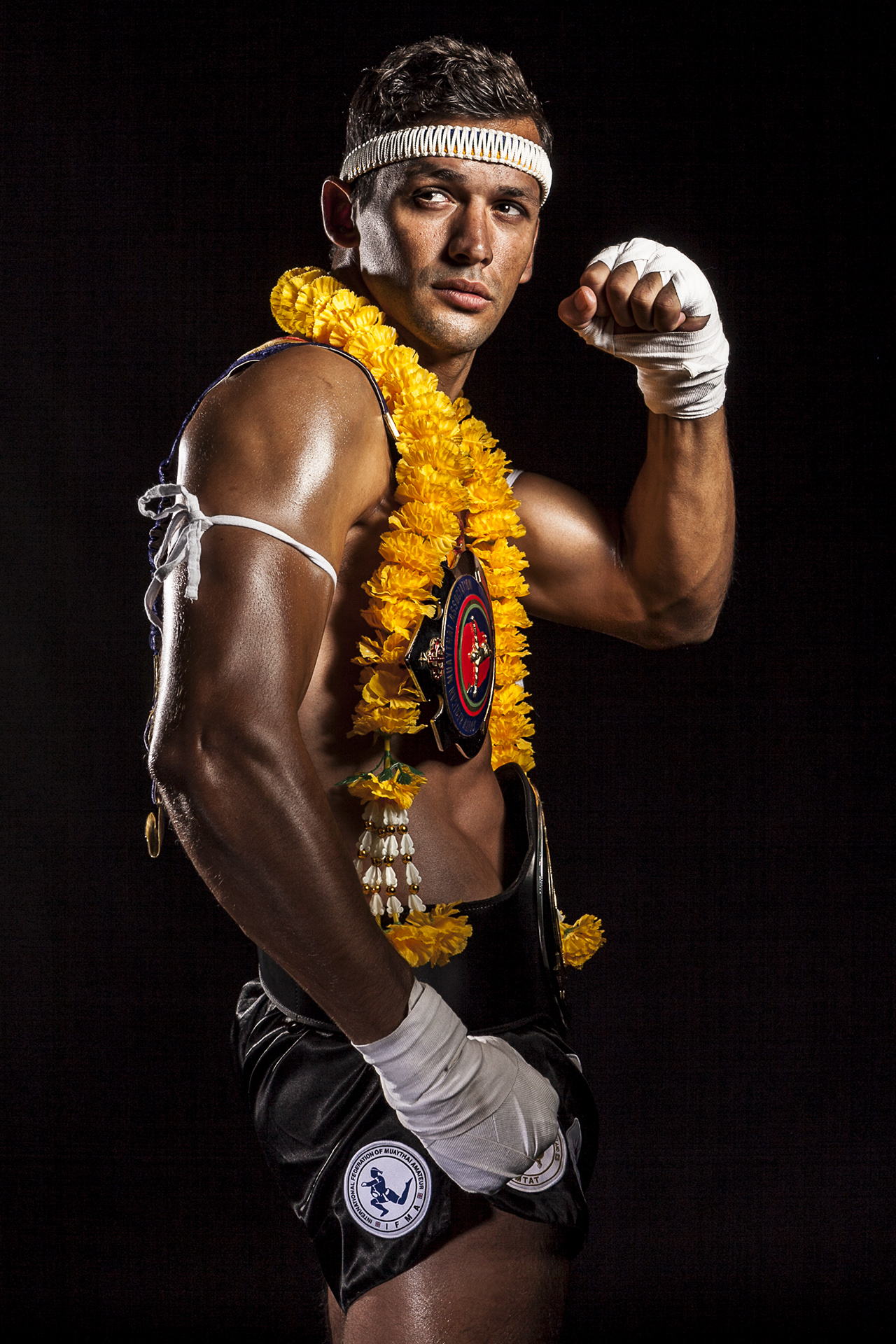
- Rothwell at Cape Town in 2016
- Born: Jarred Craig Rothwell
- Other names: Rothweiler
- Nationality: (South Africa) South African (Italy) Sicilian
- Height: 1.80 m (5 ft 11 in)
- Weight: 67 kg (148 lb; 10.6 st)
- Division: Super welterweight Light Middleweight; Middleweight; Super Middleweight
- Style: Muay Thai
- Stance: Southpaw
- Fighting out of: Cape Town, South Africa. Ko Samui, Thailand
- Team: Dragon Power. WMC Lamai. Savage Nak Muay
- Trainer: Quentin Chong
- Years active: 2002-present

Kickboxing record
- Total: 51
- Wins: 40
- By knockout: 28
- Losses: 11

Other information
- Website: www.dragonpower.co.za/dragon-power-team/fighters/
- Last updated on: 19 October 2012

Jarred Craig Rothwell is a South African Muay Thai boxer. He is a five time South African Muay Thai champion in four weight divisions, a bronze medalist at the 2011 IFMA World Championships and a silver medalist at the 2011 Arafura Games. He won the World Muaythai Council (WMC) MAD World Title Belt in 2012, and the South African Muaythai Association Middle Weight Professional Champion in 2013. Jarred qualified for the 2013 World Combat Games, competing in the 71kg division.

== Titles ==
- SAMA Middleweight Professional Champion 2013
- South African Light Middleweight Champion 2012
- World Muaythai Council MAD Title 2012 (WMC)
- Arafura Games Silver 2011
- IFMA World Championships Bronze 2011
- South African Middle Weight Champion 2011
- South African Light Heavyweight Champion 2010.
