= Rathvilly (barony) =

Barony in County Carlow, Ireland

Rathvilly Ráth Bhile (Irish)
- Barony
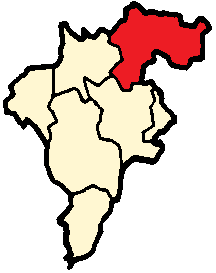
- Interactive map of Rathvilly
- Country: Ireland
- Province: Leinster
- County: Carlow

Area
  - Land: 181.32 km^{2} (70.01 sq mi)

Rathvilly (Irish: Ráth Bhile) is a barony in County Carlow, Ireland.

== Etymology ==
Rathvilly barony takes its name from the village of Rathvilly, which derive from the Irish language Ráth Bhile, meaning "rath of the sacred tree".

== Location ==
Rathvilly is found in north-east County Carlow. It contains the rivers Slaney and Derreen.

Rathvilly barony is bordered by the following baronies: to the west by Carlow; to the south by Forth; to the north by Upper Talbotstown; to the east by Ballinacor South; to the southeast by Shillelagh; and to the northwest by Kilkea and Moone.

== History ==
In the 5th century, Crimthan, King of Leinster, lived at Rathvilly. The territory was that of the Uí Felmelda Tuaid, a Uí Cheinnselaig sept descended from Feidlimidh son of Enna Ceansalagh and brother of Crimthan. The MacKeoghs here were chief bards of the Kings of Leinster. An O'Neill family was cantered here.

== List of settlements ==
Below is a list of settlements in Rathvilly barony:

- Clonmore
- Hacketstown
- Rathvilly
- Tullow
