= Ballon Hill =

- Interactive map of Ballon Hill
- 52°44′22″N 6°46′34″W
- Periods: Bronze Age

History
- Built: 2200 BC

Site notes
- Owner: Private
- Public access: No

National monument of Ireland
- Reference no.: CW013-124

Ballon Hill is a bronze age hilltop enclosure encompassing burial grounds located near the village of Ballon, County Carlow.

== Description ==
Ballon Hill is an archaeological site, listed as an Irish National Monument, which sits on a low hill near Ballon village. Predominately used as a burial site from the bronze age, the features of the site were only discovered during excavations in the 19th century and in a more recent archaeological survey using Lidar.

== History ==
The site appears to have been used for burials from 2200 BC, with at least three burial sites dating from that time. Excavated by John James Lecky and J. Richardson Smith from 1853 to 1855, the site yielded one of the largest assemblies of pottery ever discovered in Ireland. The use of the site seems to have been at its height from 2020 to 1920 BC.

Much of the pottery from the site is now housed in the National Museum of Ireland and the British Museum. In 1997, the Carlow County Museum received an unsolicited donation of razor knife and two polished stones from one of the excavated graves. In 2012 the Ballon Hill Archaeology Project was established to conduct a new survey of the site, funded by the Carlow Historical and Archaeological Society and Carlow County Development Partnership, using Lidar and other modern surveying tools. The results of this work were published as a report in 2014, and as an article in the Journal of the Royal Society of Antiquaries of Ireland.
