= Harry Rothwell =

Canadian football player

Profile
- Position: Halfback

Personal information
- Born: c. 1930s?
- Listed height: 6 ft 1 in (1.85 m)
- Listed weight: 190 lb (86 kg)

Career history
- 1954–1955: Calgary Stampeders

Harry Rothwell (born c. 1930s) is a former Canadian football player who played for the Calgary Stampeders.
