= Duckett's Grove =

Ruined house with gardens in County Carlow, Ireland

- Garrán Duckett
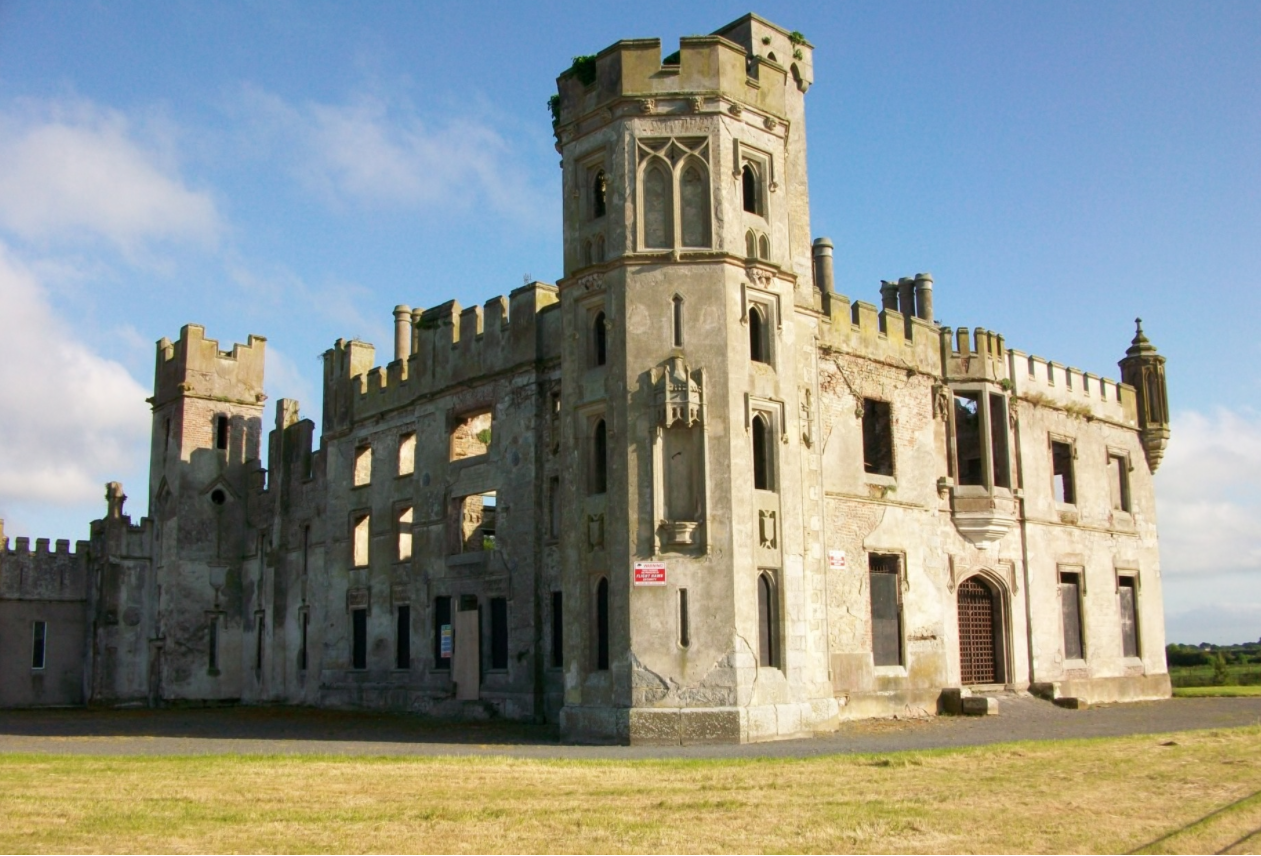

- Location within Ireland

General information
- Type: country house
- Architectural style: Gothic revival
- Location: County Carlow, Ireland
- Coordinates: 52.8575°N 6.8128°W
- Construction started: 1745
- Completed: 1825
- Owner: Government of Ireland

Design and construction
- Architects: Thomas Cobden, John Macduff Derick

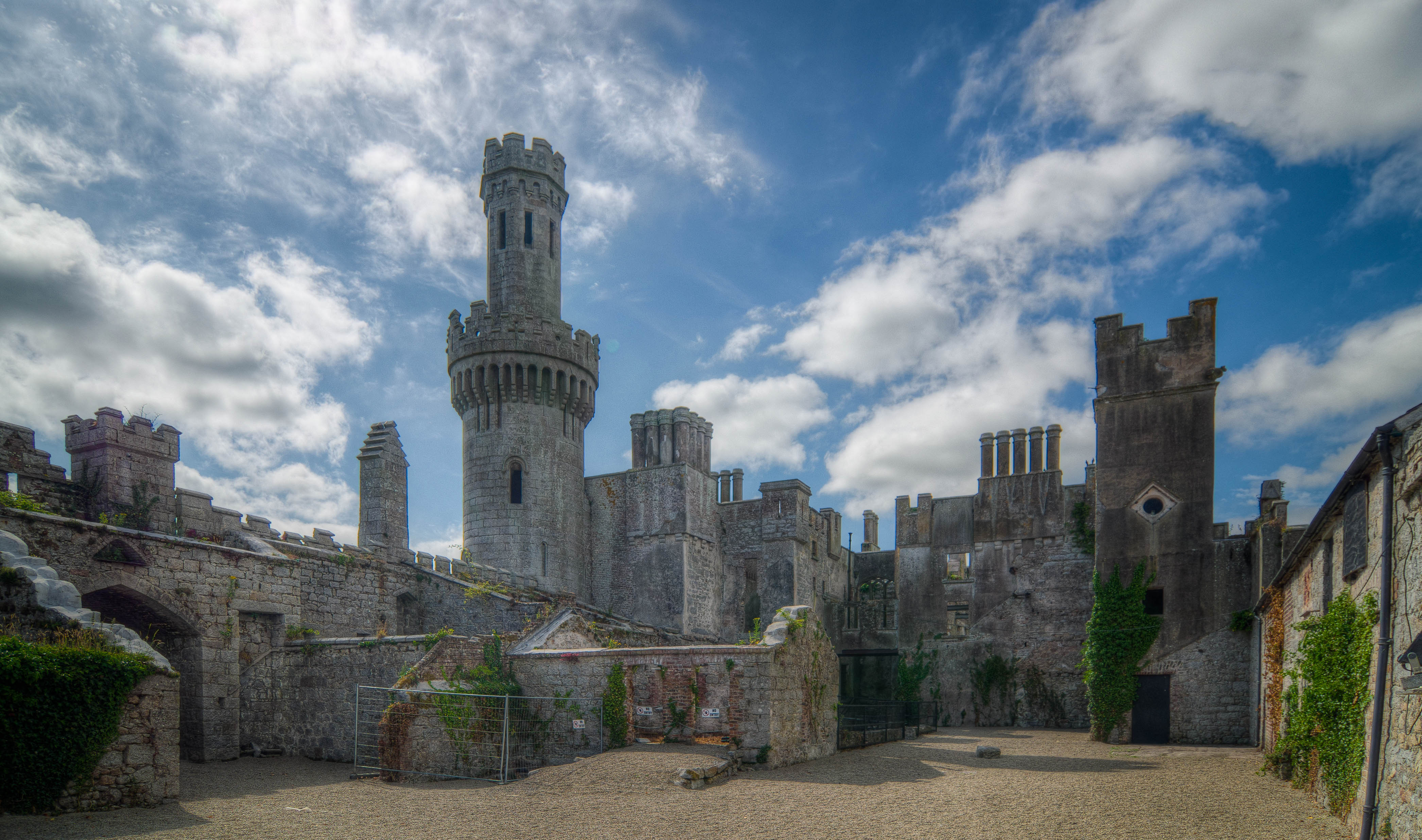
Duckett's Grove Courtyard

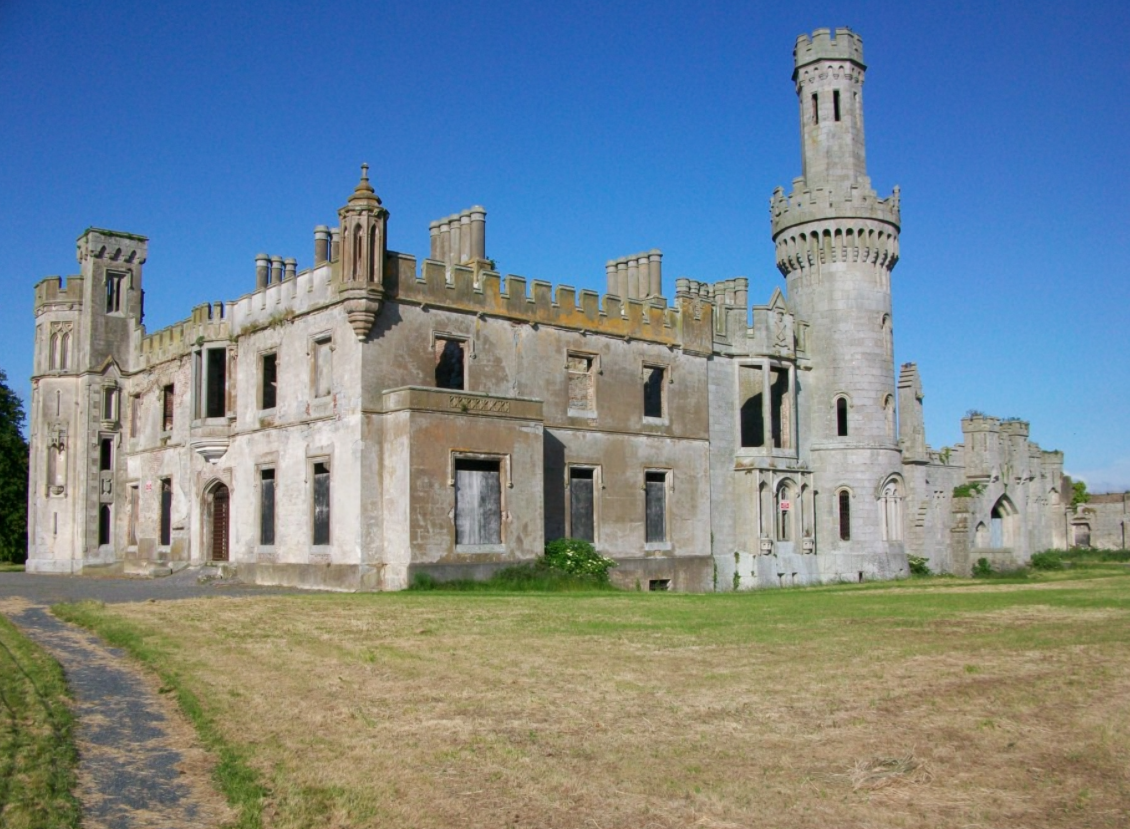
Duckett's Grove Tower side

Duckett's Grove (Irish: Garrán Duckett) is a ruined 19th-century great house and former estate in County Carlow, Ireland. Belonging to the Duckett family, the house was formerly the focal point of a 12,000-acre (49 km^{2}) estate, and dominated the local landscape of the area for more than two centuries. The interior of the house was destroyed by a major fire in the 1930s and is now inaccessible. The surrounding gardens, including two inter-connecting walled gardens, are now managed by Carlow County Council and open as a public park.

== History ==
Duckett's Grove was built c.1745 on an estate covering more than 5,000 acres (20 km^{2}) of the County Carlow countryside. Originally, the structure was designed as a standard two-storey over-basement Georgian country house. From the mid 1820s, it was redesigned in a castellated Gothic revival style by English architect Thomas Cobden for then owner and head of family, John Dawson Duckett.

This extension of the building was funded by a number of previous strategic marriages into wealthy merchant families, and resulted in some of the original Georgian features of the building being removed or hidden. The building incorporates a number of towers and turrets of varying shapes – round, square and octagonal. One tall, solid granite octagonal viewing tower rises from the structure. Duckett's Grove is further elaborately ornamented with oriels and niches containing statues. Several statues on pedestals surrounded the building and lined the approaches. The house is situated in the town land of Rainstown, approximately 10 km from Carlow and 9 km from Tullow, with the broader estate comprising several large town lands and parts of others. At its height, the house had a staff of eleven gardeners to maintain the grounds alone.

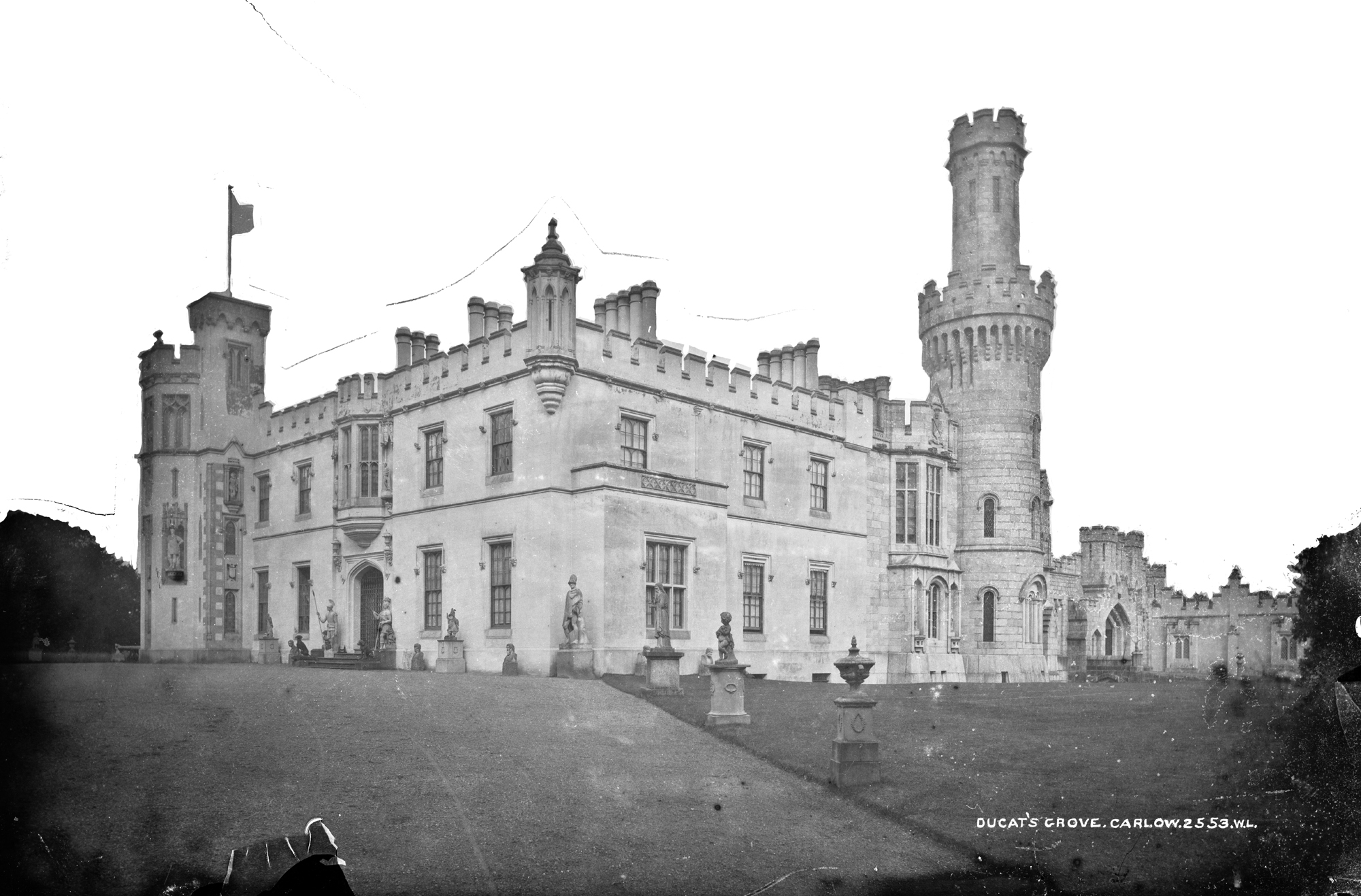
Duckett's Grove before it was destroyed by fire

After the death of William Duckett in 1908, last in the male bloodline, his second wife, Maria Georgina Duckett, lived on in the property until c. 1916. By this time she was no longer on speaking terms with her only daughter, Olive (William's stepdaughter). The outcome of this was the disinheritance of her daughter following her death 1937, leaving her what is known as "the angry shilling", just one shilling, from an estate valued at £97,735 (equivalent to £5,800,000 in 2025).

Following the departure of the Ducketts, the estate was managed by agents until 1921, and was subsequently managed by local farmers, and later by the Land Commission. The division and sale of the estate lands was completed by 1930. During this time the building was empty. During the War of Independence, it was used as a base by the local IRA and its flying column. Possibly due to the Duckett's good treatment of their tenants and employees over the years, the interiors and furniture were left intact upon the IRA's departure from the house. The house was destroyed by fire overnight on 20 April 1933. The exact cause of the fire has not been determined, however, locals reported a minor fire the week before, which they had managed to extinguish. This led to speculation about the cause of the eventual destructive fire.

== Current use ==
In September 2005, Carlow County Council acquired Duckett's Grove and commenced with the restoration of two inter-connecting walled gardens. It was officially opened in September 2007 for use as a public park.

The first of the gardens, the "Upper Walled Garden", was planted with historical varieties of shrub roses and a collection of Chinese and Japanese peonies. It is mainly planted with flowering shrubs including Echium, Watsonia, Acanthus, Daphniphyllum, Acradenia, Arbutus, Cornus, Iris, Eryngium, Beschorneria and ornamental bananas.

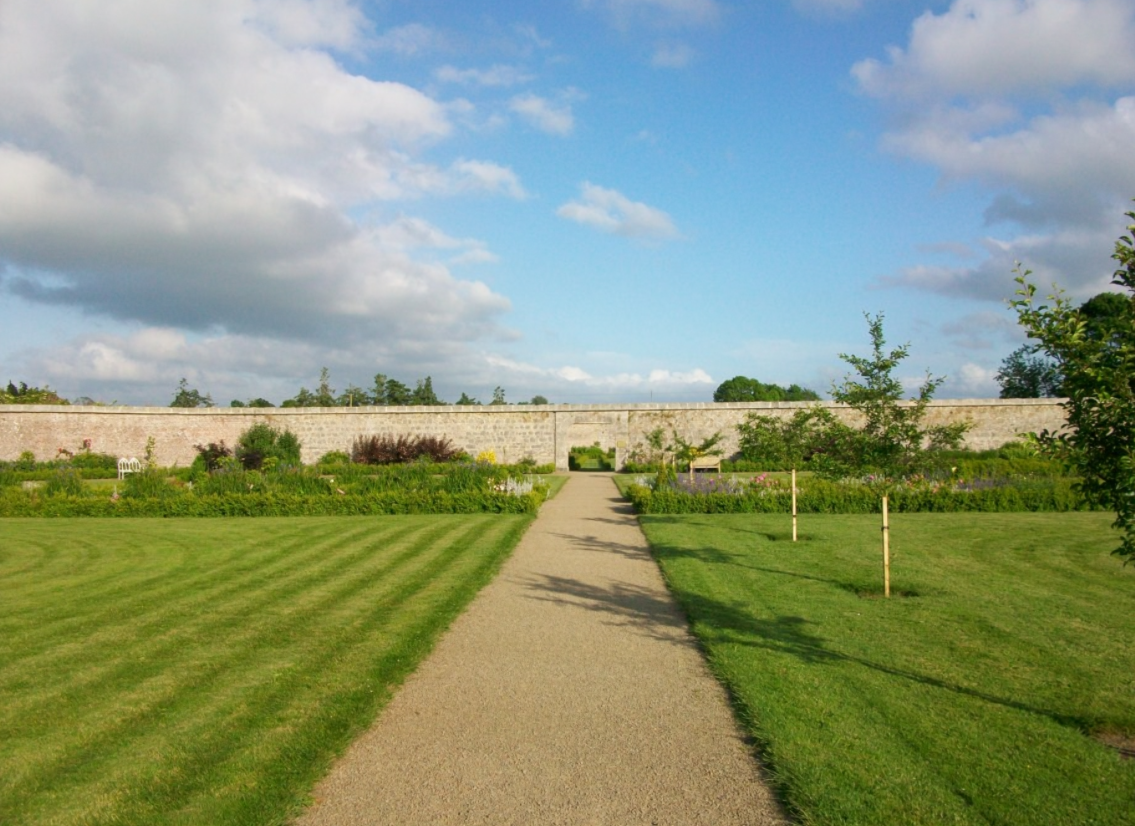
Walled Gardens

The second garden, the "Lower Walled Garden", was once the site of the family old orchard, and now contains a variety of fruits, including figs and historical varieties of Irish apples. The borders were planted to contain a variety of shrubs and perennials.

On 17 March 2011, Duckett's Grove was featured in an episode of SyFy's show Destination Truth during a 4-hour live investigation special to find out if the ruins are haunted by a Banshee Ghost.

Duckett's Grove is open to the public during daylight hours and admission is free. There are craft and gift shops located in the courtyard which are often open during the weekend and for events, including an annual Christmas fair.

== See also ==
- Carlow County Museum
- List of country houses in County Carlow
- Oak Park, County Carlow
