= St. Mullin's Lower =

Barony in County Carlow, Ireland

St. Mullin's Lower Tigh Moling Íochtarach (Irish)
- Barony
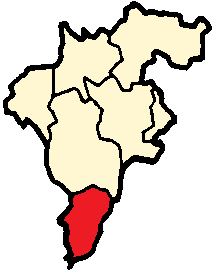
- Interactive map of St. Mullin's Lower
- Country: Ireland
- Province: Leinster
- County: Carlow

Area
  - Land: 88.7 km^{2} (34.2 sq mi)

St. Mullin's Lower (Irish: Tigh Moling Íochtarach) is a barony in County Carlow, Ireland.

== Etymology ==
St. Mullin's Lower barony takes its name from the village of St. Mullin's (Irish: Tigh Moling).

== Location ==
St. Mullin's Lower is found in south County Carlow, east of the River Barrow and west of the Blackstairs Mountains.

St. Mullin's Lower barony is bordered to the north by Idrone East, County Carlow; to the east and south by Bantry, County Wexford; to the southwest by Ida, County Kilkenny; and to the west by Gowran, County Kilkenny.

== History ==
The ancient land of the Ui Drona was cantered here in the 8th century.

== List of settlements ==
Below is a list of settlements in St. Mullin's Lower:

- Ballymurphy
- Graiguenamanagh (southern part)
