= Ballon, County Carlow =

Village in County Carlow, Ireland

Ballon Balana
- Village
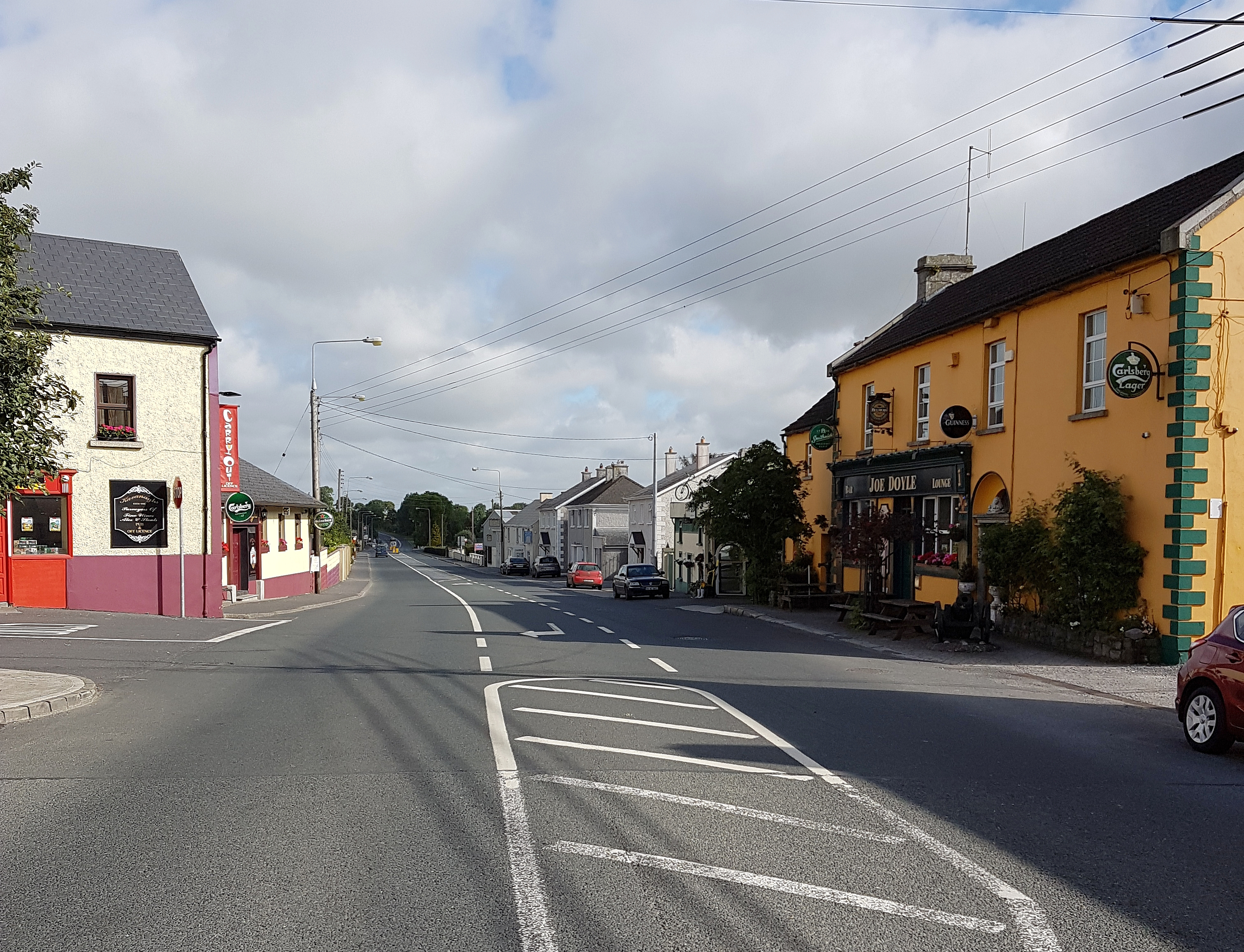
- Main Street

- Location in Ireland
- Coordinates: 52°44′26″N 6°46′04″W
- Country: Ireland
- Province: Leinster
- County: County Carlow
- Elevation: 103 m (338 ft)

Population (2022)
  - Total: 801
- Time zone: UTC+0 (WET)
  - Summer (DST): UTC-1 (IST (WEST))
- Irish Grid Reference: S832661
- Website: www.ballonvillage.com

Ballon (Irish: Balana) is a village, civil parish and townland in County Carlow, Ireland. It is located on the N80 road near Carlow town.

== Amenities ==
Money from "Siopa Glas" on Main Street is channelled back into the village, school garden and to local charities.

There is a primary school, Ballon National School, and community hall on the main street. Ballon participates in the Tidy Towns competition. The Ballon Improvement Group also work with the local school especially in the Organic Vegetable Garden and the Wild Habitat project.

The village community centre was renovated during 2013 at a cost of €656,000. There is also a grotto opposite the church.

== Transport ==
=== Bus ===
Traditionally the village was poorly served by public transport. Since April 2015 the village is served by Bus Éireann route 132 several times a day to Dublin via Tullow and Tallaght. In the other direction the route serves Kildavin and Bunclody. A number of Ring a Link and Wexford Local Link buses also serve the village.

=== Rail ===
Both Carlow railway station and Muine Bheag railway station are approximately 18 kilometres distant.

== Sports ==
Ballon is home to Ballon GAA club which competes in the Carlow Intermediate Football Championship. It is also home to St Martins GAA club, which caters for boys and girls from under-6 to under-17.

Ballon is home to Burrin Celtic who play in the Carlow & District Football League. A Championship side F.C. Carlow also played at Burrin Celtic's home ground, The Valley on Fenagh Road.

== Ballon Hill ==
Ballon Hill, although only approximately 137 metres (450 ft) above sea level, overlooks the surrounding lowlands. Geologically the hill is of granite covered by limestone.

== See also ==
- List of towns and villages in Ireland
