= Royal Oak, County Carlow =

Village in County Carlow, Ireland

Coordinates: 52°42′03″N 6°59′08″W

Royal Oak (Irish: An Dair Ríoga) is a small village in County Carlow, Ireland. It is on the west side of the River Barrow, across from Bagenalstown, and is off the former N9 road (now R448 road from Naas to Waterford). It is not in or a part of Bagenalstown.

Royal Oak is within the townland of Clorusk (from Irish Cloch Rusc, meaning 'stone house of the moor/marsh').

== See also ==
- List of towns and villages in Ireland
