= Johnny Loftus (coach) =

English-American boxing trainer (1874–1935)

John Loftus
- Born: November 30, 1874; England
- Died: May 9, 1935 (aged 60); Washington, D.C., U.S.
- Occupation: Boxing trainer
- Years active: 1895–1935
- Spouse: Elizabeth Cella (m. 1899; died 1934)
- Children: 5

John William Loftus Sr. (November 30, 1874 – May 9, 1935) was an English-American boxing coach and trainer, dubbed one of the greatest boxing coaches of his time. During his 40 year long career, he trained boxers such as Jim Jeffries and Jack Johnson.

== Early life ==
Loftus was born in England in 1874. He immigrated to the United States when he was a child in the early 1880s. He was naturalized as a U.S. citizen and was living in Philadelphia, Pennsylvania by 1899.

== Career ==
Loftus started work in the boxing industry as early as 1895, when he was around twenty years old. He had been a jockey and eventually found himself in the field of boxing. As a teenager, he would have casual matches with local boys. Not long after his first paid fight, he became a sparring partner to professional boxers, and eventually a trainer.

Loftus worked as a boxing trainer for many years. He was nicknamed "the old Gray Eagle of the Quaker City." Over the years, Loftus trained several well-known boxers, including Jim Jeffries, Jack Johnson, Stanley Ketchel, Terry McGovern, Bat Nelson, Frankie Neil, Young Corbett, Johnny Kilbane, Bob Fitzsimmons, George Dixon, and Jimmy Gardner.

Of his coaching styles, Loftus was described as "a trainer of singular gifts and a man of lovable characteristics." He was known to be kind at heart and of a passive temperament, unusual for a boxing trainer, but had experience and knowledge, which he used well. He understood the workings of the human body and the way in which everything worked together. He used this ability to direct and train his pupils.

== Personal life ==
Loftus married Elizabeth Cella in 1899 in Philadelphia. They had five children. Loftus' wife died in 1934.

== Death ==
John Loftus died on May 9, 1935, in Washington D.C., after an operation. He was 60 years old. He was buried in Holy Cross Cemetery in Yeadon, Pennsylvania.
A moment of silence was held in his memory at the Pennsylvania heavyweight boxing championship on May 21, 1935.
