= Vigor (name) =

Vigor is a given name and a surname. It may refer to:

- Saint Vigor (died 537), French bishop, missionary and saint
- Vigor or Victor Boucquet (1619–1677), Flemish painter
- Vigor Bovolenta (1974–2012), Italian volleyball player
- Eileen Vigor (born 1935), English retired cricketer and lawn bowler
- Jane Vigor (1699–1783), English letter writer from the Russian court
- Michael Vigor (born 1990), Scottish-born Australian basketball player
- Xia Vigor (born 2009), British-Filipino child actress and TV host
