= Myshall =

Village in County Carlow, Ireland

Myshall Irish: Míseal
- Village
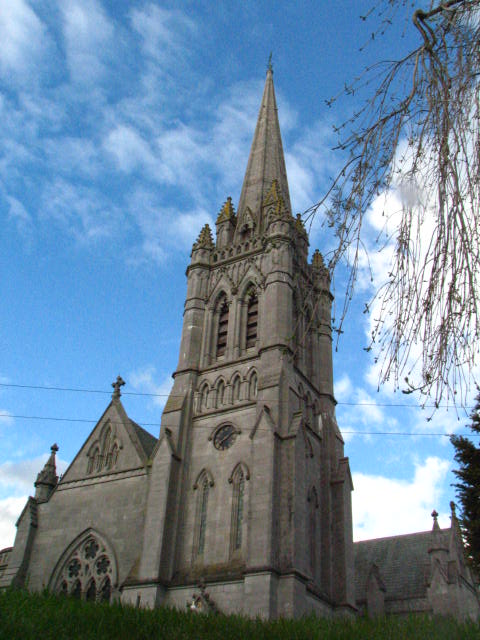
- Adelaide Memorial Church

- Location in Ireland
- Coordinates: 52°41′10″N 6°46′49″W
- Country: Ireland
- Province: Leinster
- County: Carlow
- Elevation: 294 m (965 ft)

Population (2022)
  - Total: 292
- Time zone: UTC+0 (WET)
  - Summer (DST): UTC-1 (IST (WEST))
- Irish Grid Reference: S826599

Myshall (Irish: Míseal (derived from Maigh Íseal), meaning 'the low plain') is a village, townland and civil parish in County Carlow, Ireland. The village is 22 km (14 mi) southeast of Carlow town, on the slopes of Mount Leinster and on the R724 road.

== Adelaide Memorial Church ==
The Church of Ireland Adelaide Memorial Church of Christ the Redeemer in Myshall is a miniature version of Salisbury Cathedral. Completed in 1913, Dover-based businessman, John Duguid, commissioned it in memory of his daughter Constance, who was killed in a horse riding accident while visiting her sister in Myshall, and her mother Adelaide, who died in 1903. Both are buried here.

The parish of Myshall has five cemeteries: three in the village itself, one about a mile out the Carlow road, and one in Drumphea about two miles from the village.

== Sport ==
Myshall is home to Naomh Eoin GAA club. Since its formation, the club has won 18 Carlow Senior Hurling Championships. They are also the only Carlow team to have won a senior hurling and football double (in 1986) and an U-21 hurling and football double in 2010. The Juvenile Teams range from U6 to U18 or Minor.

Myshall is also the home of Myshall Camogie Club. This club won the county camogie championship 25 years in a row between 2000 and 2024. They also achieved a 3-in-a-row in the Leinster junior club competition (2011, 2012, and 2013) and were All-Ireland junior club champions in 2012 and 2013. In 2016 they won both the Leinster and All-Ireland Intermediate Championship.

== See also ==
- List of towns and villages in Ireland
