= Milford Mills, County Carlow =

Irish watermill

Milford Mills
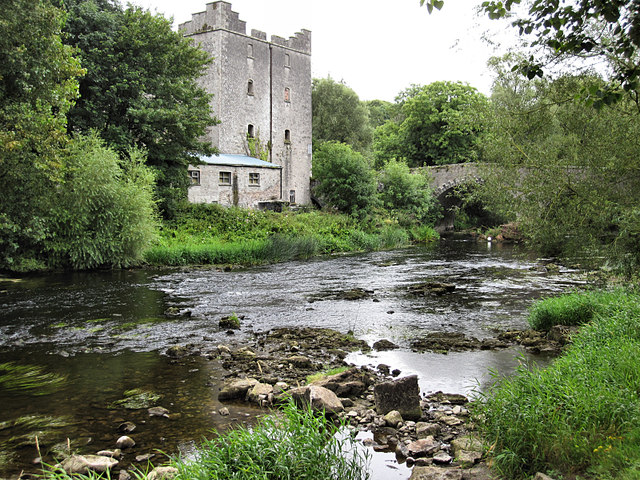
- Milford Mills, as viewed from across the River Barrow, alongside Millford's weird and park

- Location within Ireland

Flour mill and malting house
- Location: Milford, County Carlow, Ireland
- Owner: Alexander family
- Coordinates: 52°46′53″N 6°57′56″W

Construction
- Built: 1790
- Floor count: 7

Water Power
- Wheels: 2
- Diameter / width of water wheel: 18 metres and 22 metres /

Milford Mills is an 18th-century watermill which sits on the banks of the River Barrow at Milford, County Carlow. Originally built as a flour mill and malting house, it was later employed as a hydroelectric power station.

== Establishment ==
The first mill to sit on this site was built around 1775 by a James Conolly Esq. In the late 1780s, John Alexander, a member of Northern Irish family of Scottish extraction moved to County Carlow, purchasing lands in Ballygowan, Ballinabranna, Craanluskey, and Tomard. The mills that can be seen to this day were subsequently built under the auspices of the "Alexander & Conolly". The two mill wheels were designed by William Fairbairn of Manchester, with the wheels being 18 and 22 feet wide respectively. The mill had a turnover of £195,000 a year by the 1830s. Mr. & Mrs Hall's Ireland described the mills as "one of the most extensive and celebrated in Ireland" in 1840. The mill and the eight acres on which it sat were valued at £307 during the 1853 Griffith's Primary Valuation of Tenements. The mill exported to Manchester and Liverpool, and were shipped by barge to Waterford and Dublin. At its height in the 1860s the mill was said to have the most powerful millwheels in Britain or Ireland. In 1825, Alexander bought out James Conolly, and the mill was refurbished.

On Tuesday 4 November 1862 the flour mills were totally destroyed by fire. Smoke was seen at 11:30pm coming from the windows of the upper lofts, and was witnessed by the Milford Constabulary and raised the alarm. The fire was seen by the Carlow police a few miles away, who also mobilised to the scene along with those from Leighlinbridge and Muine Bheag. The Carlow fire brigade came to the scene under the command of sub-inspector Medlicott. Despite this the entire building was engulfed in flames, destroying the machinery and stored corn, with the first floor and six lofts collapsing. The fire was contained to the mill itself, with the nearby malt houses surviving. The wheat burnt for some time after the main fire was extinguished. The Carlow Sentinel described the mill as "a sad scene of havoc and desolation." It was hypothesised that the fire was started by sparks from the friction of the grinding stones igniting some of the corn.

The extant malting building was later used as a tannery, which was established by a leather merchant, Kennedy O’Brien, in the 1940s. The tannery processed sheepskins from around Ireland, with the leather supplying shoe factories across the country. It also exported leather and chamois to the United Kingdom and the United States. Over 100 people were employed at the tannery at its peak in the 1950s. Another fire in July 1965 gutted the structure again, closing the tannery and drawing to an end industrial activity at the site.

== Electricity generation ==
In 1891 the mill was modified to generate electricity, in doing so Carlow became the first inland town in Ireland or Britain to receive electric power. The mill was operated by an English-based electric company Messrs Gordon and Company. The mills still generate electricity feeding into the national grid following the mills recommissioning in 1990s.

== Structure ==
Originally the mill consisted of three large buildings, two for grinding wheat and corn and the third for malting barley. The fire in the 1860s left just the malting house extant. The main mill is an eleven-bay 7 storey structure, and has a crenellated parapet. When the building was recommissioned in the 1990s to produce electricity a concrete block turbine house was added.

In 1991, the Old Carlow Society erected a commemorative plaque at the site.
