= Milford Mill =

Milford Mill refers to the following places in the suburbs of Baltimore, Maryland, in the United States:

- Milford Mill, Maryland, a census-designated place in Baltimore County near Pikesville and Randallstown
- Milford Mill Road, a major road in Baltimore County that runs from Pikesville to Milford Mill
- Milford Mill station, a commuter rail station in the Sudbrook Park area of Pikesville, Maryland
- Milford Mill Academy, a high school in the Milford Mill area

== Other places ==
- Milford Mills, Pennsylvania, a village in Chester County
- Milford Mills, County Carlow, an 18th-century watermill in Milford, County Carlow, Ireland
