= Castlemore Moat =

Motte-and-bailey in County Carlow, Ireland

- Ráth an Chaisleáin Mhóir (Irish)
- Castlemore Castle, Fotheret O'Nolan, Rathsillan
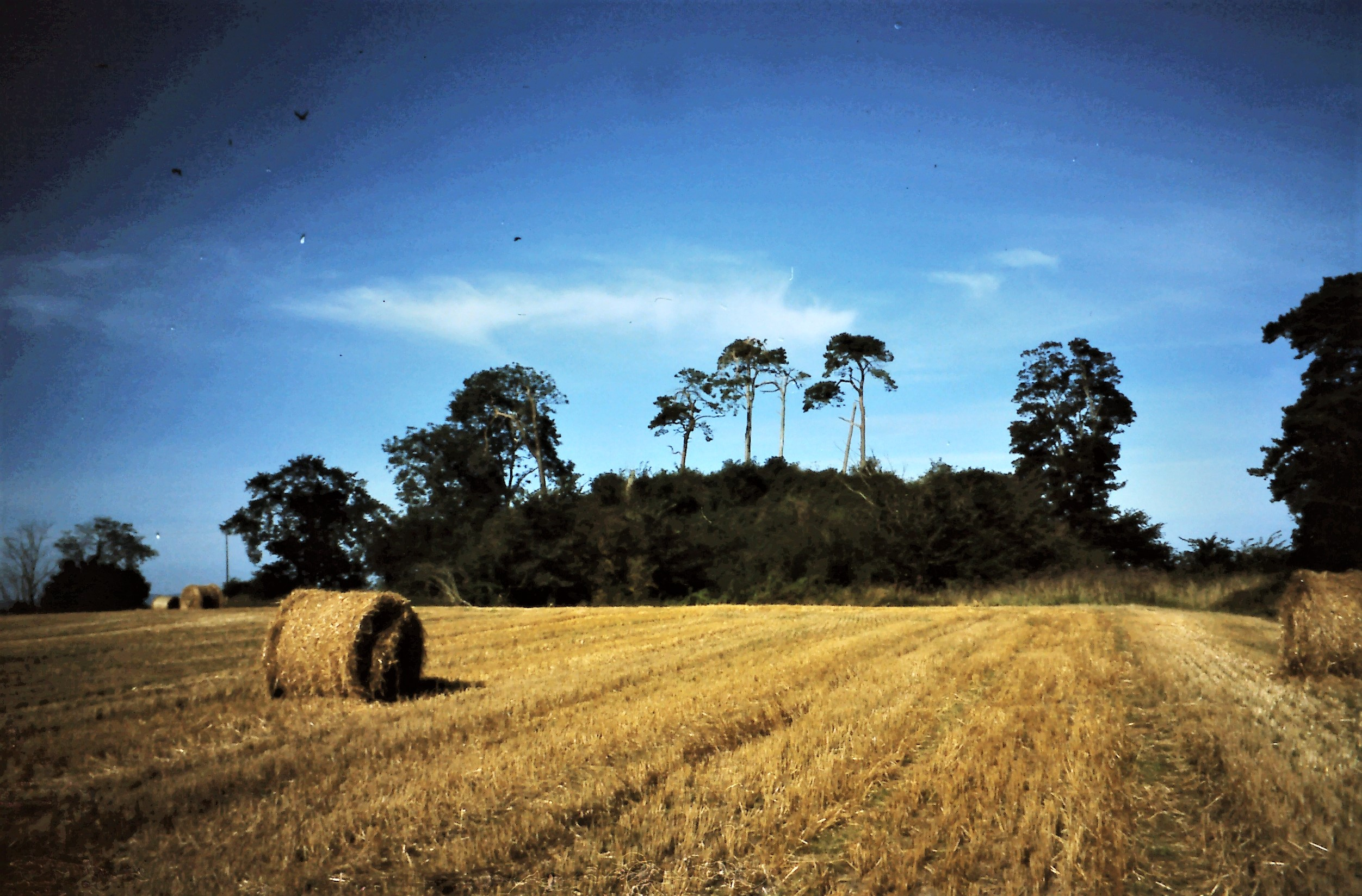

- Location within Ireland
- 52.809489°N 6.772553°W
- Type: motte
- Periods: Norman Ireland
- Cultures: Cambro-Norman, Old English
- Location: Castlemore, Fennagh, County Carlow, Ireland

History
- Built: 12th century
- Built by: Raymond FitzGerald

Site notes
- Material: earth
- Height: 9 metres (30 ft)
- Circumference: 50 metres (55 yd)

Designations
- Designation: National Monument

National monument of Ireland
- Official name: Castlemore
- Reference no.: 545

Castlemore Moat is a motte-and-bailey and National Monument in County Carlow, Ireland.

== Location ==
Castlemore Moat is about 2 kilometres (1.2 mi) northwest of Tullow and 2 kilometres west of the River Slaney. It is not to be confused with Castlemore House, a 19th-century country house 1 kilometre south of the motte.

== History and archaeology ==
The motte and bailey castle was constructed in the 12th century AD by Raymond FitzGerald (Raymond le Gros), one of the commanders of the Norman invasion of Ireland. The land of Forth O'Nolan was granted to Raymond and he married Basilia, sister of Strongbow. They lived together at Castlemore.

All that remains is the motte, an artificial hill about 9 metres (30 ft) high, and a standing stone measuring 170 by 45 by 30 centimetres (5.58 by 1.48 by 0.98 ft) with a Latin cross inscribed in it, with a suppedaneum (foot-rest at the base). The motte is not a perfect circle, but measures 18 metres (59 ft) east-to-west and 13 metres (43 ft) north-to-south.
