= Ballinabranna =

Ballinabranna Baile na mBreatnach
- Village
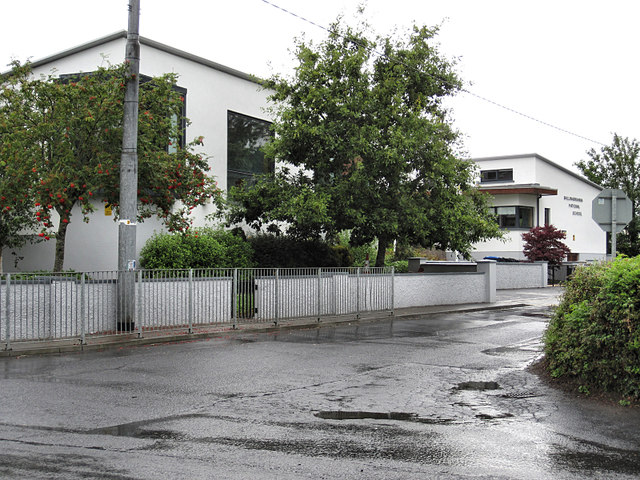
- Ballinabranna National School

- Location in Ireland
- Coordinates: 52°47′08″N 6°59′06″W
- Country: Ireland
- Province: Leinster
- County: County Carlow
- Elevation: 90 m (300 ft)

Population (2022)
  - Total: 557
- Time zone: UTC+0 (WET)
  - Summer (DST): UTC-1 (IST (WEST))

Ballinabranna or Ballinabrannagh (Irish: Baile na mBreatnach) is a small village in County Carlow, Ireland. It is located approximately 8 kilometres south of Carlow and 5 kilometres from Junction 6 of the M9 motorway. It is within the townland of Ballinabrannagh, and is in the barony of Idrone West. As of the 2022 census, the population of the village was 557.

== History ==
Traditionally a rural townland, it developed into a nucleated village due to its proximity to the M9 motorway. The Milford Park and Gort na Gréine housing developments, built in the late-2000s and 2010s respectively, significantly expanded the population of the area. It was first included (as Ballinabrannagh) as a census town for the 2011 census, at which time it had a population of 389 people.

The village has a church (St. Fintan's), a child daycare, a GAA club/gym, and a national (primary) school. As of 2014, the school (Ballinabranna National School) had an enrollment of approximately 170 pupils.

== See also ==
- List of towns and villages in Ireland
