= County Carlow =

County in Ireland

Coordinates: 52°40′N 6°50′W

County Carlow Contae Cheatharlach
- County
- Coat of arms
- Nicknames: The Dolmen County (Others)
- Anthem: "Follow Me up to Carlow"
- Country: Ireland
- Province: Leinster
- Region: Southern
- Established: 1210
- County town: Carlow

Government
  - Local authority: Carlow County Council
  - Dáil constituency: Carlow–Kilkenny
  - EP constituency: South

Area
  - Total: 897 km^{2} (346 sq mi)
  - Rank: 31st
- Highest elevation (Mount Leinster): 794 m (2,605 ft)

Population (2022)
  - Total: 61,931
  - Rank: 30th
  - Density: 69.0/km^{2} (179/sq mi)
- Demonym: Carlovian
- Time zone: UTC±0 (WET)
  - Summer (DST): UTC+1 (IST)
- Eircode routing keys: R21, R93 (primarily)
- Telephone area codes: 059 (primarily)
- ISO 3166 code: IE-CW
- Vehicle index mark code: CW
- Website: Official website

County Carlow (/ˈkɑːrloʊ/ KAR-loh; Irish: Contae Cheatharlach) is a county located in the Southern Region of Ireland, within the province of Leinster. Carlow is the second smallest and the third least populous of Ireland's 32 traditional counties. Carlow County Council is the governing local authority.

The county is named after the town of Carlow, which lies on the River Barrow and is both the county town and largest settlement, with over 40% of the county's population. Much of the remainder of the population also reside within the Barrow valley, in towns such as Leighlinbridge, Bagenalstown, Tinnahinch, Borris and St Mullins. Carlow shares a border with Kildare and Laois to the north, Kilkenny to the west, Wicklow to the east and Wexford to the southeast.

Carlow is known as "The Dolmen County", a nickname based on the Brownshill Dolmen, a 6,000-year-old megalithic portal tomb which is reputed to have the heaviest capstone in Europe, weighing over 100 metric tonnes. The town of Carlow was founded by the Normans in 1207 and the county was shired shortly thereafter, making it one of the oldest counties in Ireland. During the 14th century, the county was the seat of power of the Kingdom of Leinster, as well as the capital of the Lordship of Ireland from 1361 to 1374.

== Etymology ==
The county was named after the town of Carlow, which is an anglicisation of the Irish Ceatharlach. Historically, it was anglicised as Caherlagh, Caterlagh and Catherlagh, which are closer to the Irish spelling. In the 19th century, John O'Donovan, a scholar working with Ordnance Survey Ireland, hypothesised that the origin of the name was Ceatharloch (meaning "quadruple lake"), since ceathar means "four" and loch means "lake". It is therefore directly translated as "Four lakes". This was accepted by the foremost etymologist of the time, PW Joyce, as the definitive origin of the name; although Joyce noted there was no evidence to suggest that these lakes ever existed in the area.

It is today believed that the first part of the name derives from the Old Irish word cethrae ("animals, cattle, herds, flocks"), which is related to ceathar ("four") and therefore signified "four-legged". The second part of the name is the ending -lach, meaning that "Ceatharlach" referred to a "place of cattle or herds". As the local dialect of Irish evolved, the "th" phoneme became obsolete. Consequently, by the 13th century the pronunciation of the name would have been much closer to its modern anglicised form. Surviving texts from the 15th and 16th centuries which spell the name as "Carelagh" and "Kerlac" seem to reflect this change in pronunciation.

== Geography and subdivisions ==
Carlow is the second-smallest of Ireland's 32 counties by area, and the third-smallest in terms of population. It is the second-smallest of Leinster's 12 counties in both size and population. Carlow is landlocked and bordered by five counties – Kilkenny to the west, Wicklow to the east, Wexford to the southeast, and Laois and Kildare to the north. Carlow town is both the county town and largest settlement, and is situated on the River Barrow in the north of the county approximately 80 km (50 mi) from Waterford and 85 km (53 mi) from Dublin.

=== Physical geography ===
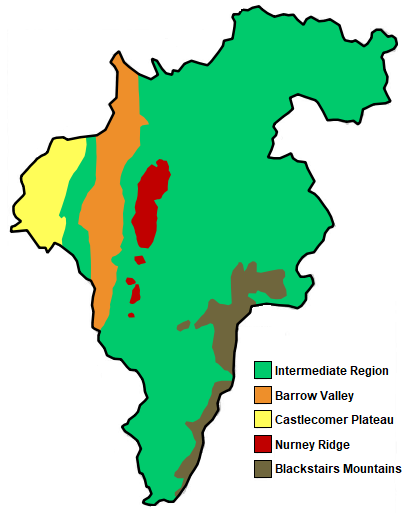
Physiographic regions of County Carlow

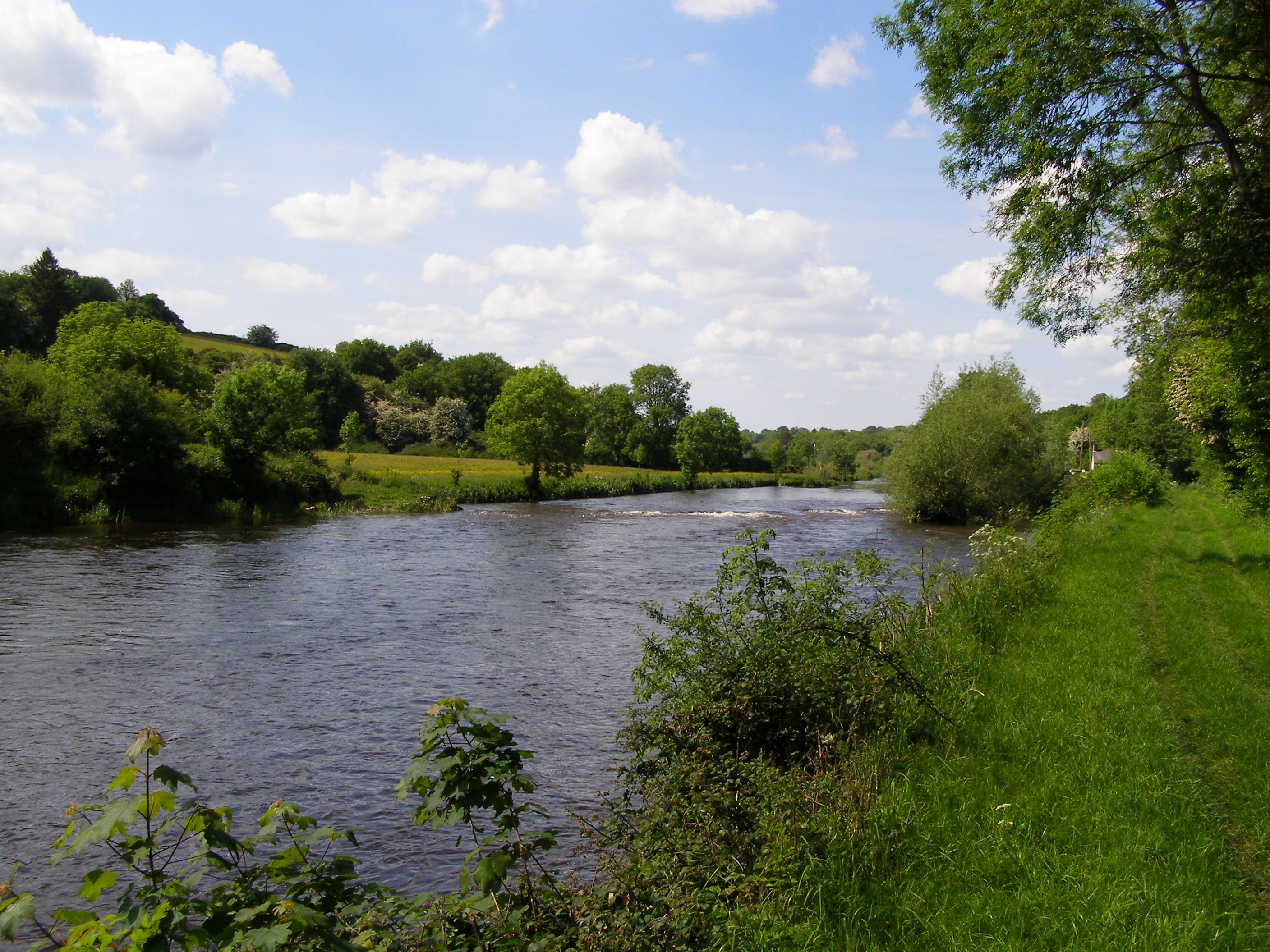
The River Barrow south of Borris

Carlow's southern, western and eastern boundaries are demarcated by the county's three principal geographic features – the River Barrow, the River Slaney and the Blackstairs Mountains – which are all European Union designated Special Areas of Conservation (SACs). The county is divided into six physiographic regions – the Barrow Valley, Castlecomer Plateau, Nurney Ridge and Blackstairs Mountains, as well as the Tullow Lowlands and Southern Wedge, which are grouped together as an "Intermediate Region". The county is generally rural in nature and has a population density of 63 people per km2, with the majority of the population living within the Barrow Valley.

The River Barrow, at 192 km (119 mi) in length, is Ireland's second longest river. The river cuts out a low-lying valley as it traverse through the county, and much of the county is drained by the Barrow and its tributaries. The most prominent tributary of the Barrow in the area is the Burren River, which rises at Mount Leinster and flows through the county for 39 km (24 mi) before joining the Barrow at Carlow town. The east and northeast of the county are drained by the River Slaney and its tributaries – the River Derreen, which flows through Hacketstown and Tullow, and the River Derry, which rises at Eagle Hill south of Hacketstown and forms the border between Carlow and Wexford before joining the Slaney at Bunclody.

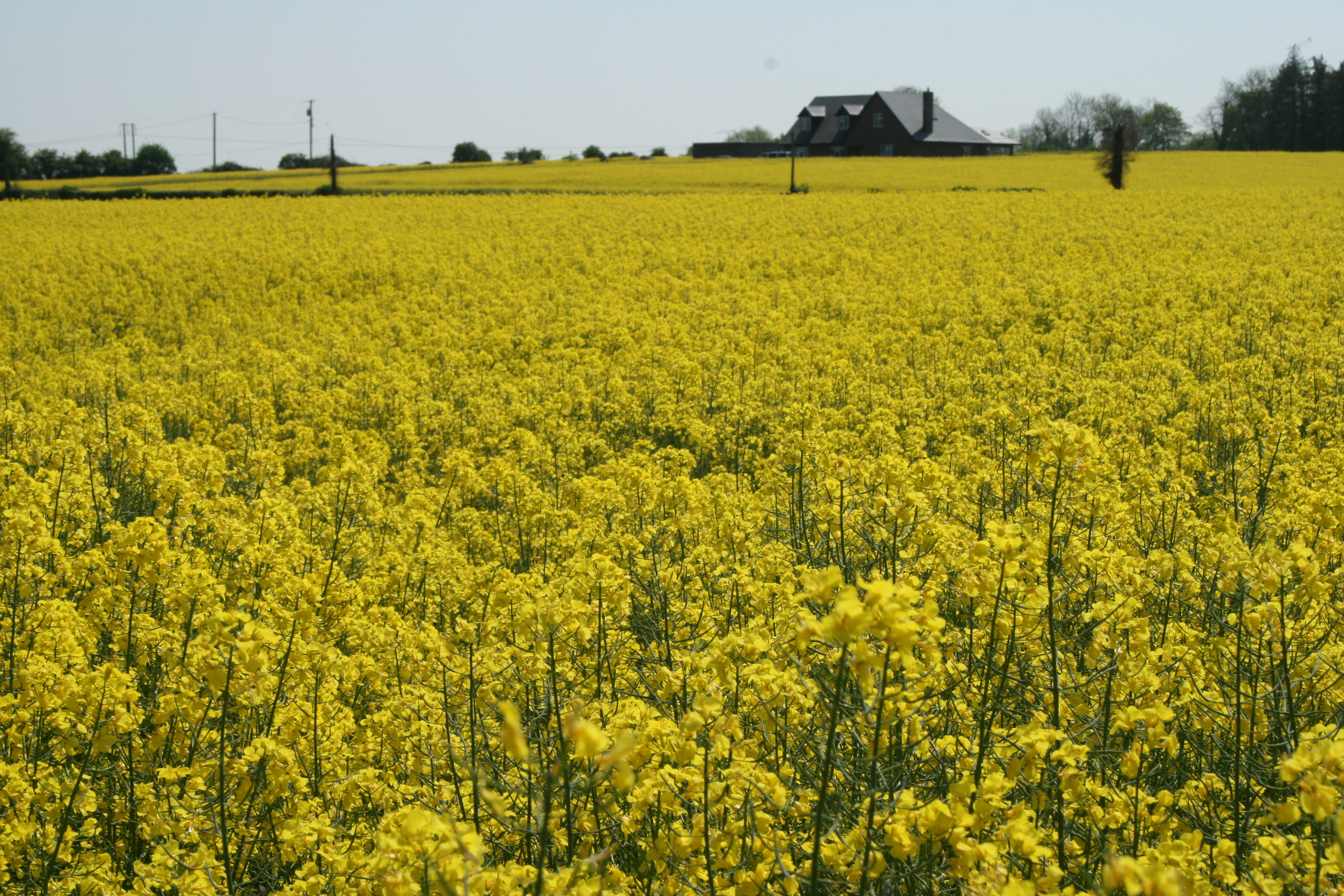
Flat plains typical of northern Carlow

As of 2017, there is a total of 8,403 ha (20,764 acres) of forest cover in the county, representing 9.4% of total land area. This is below the national average of 11% forest cover and represents just 1.1% of the national forest total. The majority of the county's forests are located in upland areas, namely the Blackstairs Mountains in the east of the county, and the Castlecomer Plateau in the west of the county. Conifers are primarily grown in these areas and constitute 69.9% of all forest cover within the county. Due to the high quality of land in the lowlands and southern wedge, the area under forest is low, as most of the land is used for agricultural purposes. Some of the oldest deciduous trees in the county are found in the yew grove at the Huntington Gardens, which were planted by the Esmonde family over 500 years ago. Other notable woodland areas include the Oak Park Forest, which is a ca. 123 acre mixed forest of beech, oak, Scots pine, silver fir, larch and sycamore; the Altamont Gardens and the Barrow Way.

==== Climate ====
Carlow is in a maritime temperate oceanic region according to Köppen climate classification. It experiences cool winters, mild humid summers, and a lack of temperature extremes. Met Éireann records climate data for Carlow from their station at Oak Park, situated at 61 m (200 ft) above sea level. The coldest month is February, with an average daily minimum temperature of 2.1 °C (36 °F), and the hottest month is July, with an average daily maximum temperature of 21.3 °C (70 °F). The driest months are April and May, with 45 mm (2 in) and 50 mm (2 in) of rain respectively. The wettest month is November, with 98 mm (4 in) of rain on average. Humidity is high year round and rainfall is evenly distributed throughout the year. A number of synoptic stations which record rainfall are located throughout the county. The driest area of the county is at Tullow, which receives 840 mm (33 in) of rainfall per year, and the Blackstairs Mountains are the wettest area, receiving 1,446 mm (57 in) of rainfall per year.

While Carlow is often marketed as being part of the Sunny Southeast alongside Wexford and Waterford, due to its inland location it does not typically benefit from the elevated sunshine hours observed in the coastal areas of those counties. However, it does experience significantly higher average temperatures and lighter winds during the summer months due to its sheltered location. This was exemplified during the 2018 summer heat wave, when Oak Park was both the hottest and driest location in Ireland.

=== Geology ===
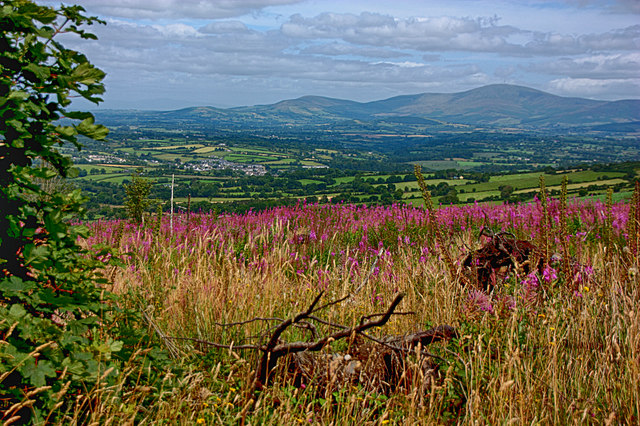
Undulating countryside of central Carlow

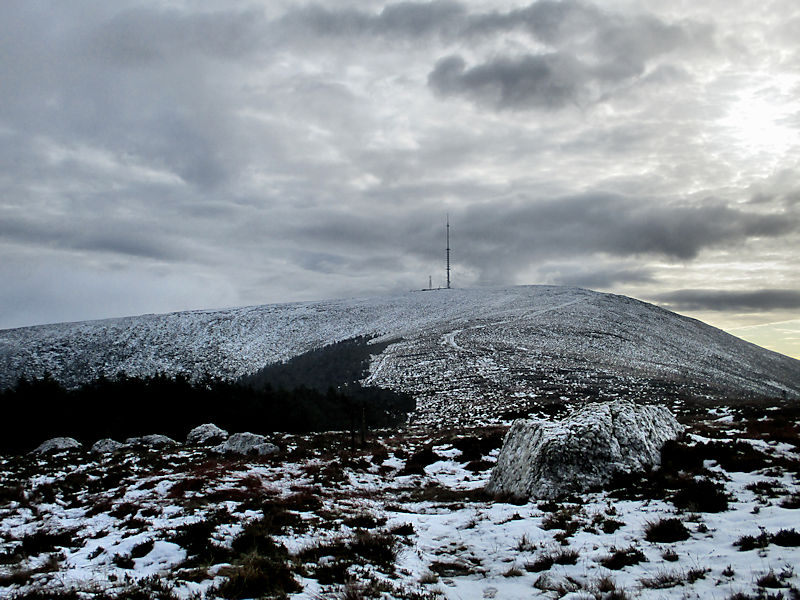
Summit of Mount Leinster

The bedrock geology of Carlow consists primarily of granite, which underlies roughly 70% of the county. Following the closure of the Iapetus Ocean approximately 400 Mya, a mountain range formed in the area which was then intruded with magma. This cooled slowly beneath the surface, forming a large granite pluton. The mountains, which were mostly composed of Ordovician seafloor sediments, were eventually eroded away, exposing the granite at the surface. During the Carboniferous, ca. 300 Mya, limestone re-buried this granite, but has also since been eroded away. More resilient Carboniferous period shales and sandstones are preserved in the Castlecomer Plateau, along with significant quantities of coal.

The oldest rocks in the county are the surviving remnants of these Ordovician seafloor sediments (ca. 540 Mya), and are found in a thin belt extending across the east of the county. These sediments were intensely metamorphosed by the heat of the granite into high-grade schists and hornfels. Minerals such as staurolite, andalusite and garnet are commonplace in these older formations.

The soils of the county are mostly derived from glacial till, rather than solid bedrock geology. These typically consist of a mix of clay, sand and gravel. Occasionally glacial melt-water would form a long ridge of sand and gravel known as an esker. One such example is preserved within the county and is a proposed natural heritage area, referred to as the Ballymoon Esker. The north of the county is generally flat, while central and southern Carlow are characterised by an undulating to rolling topography which becomes progressively hillier towards the south and east. The Blackstairs Mountains are the highest and most extensive upland area, with Mount Leinster rising to 794 m (2,605 ft), making it the highest point in both Carlow and Wexford and the seventh highest county top in Ireland.

=== Baronies ===
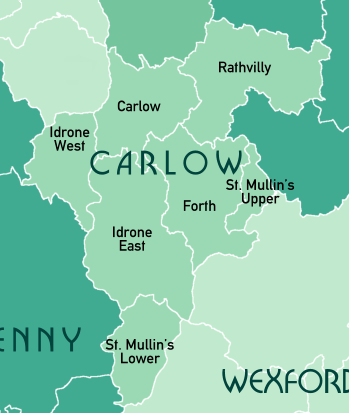
The Baronies of County Carlow

There are seven historic baronies in the county. While baronies continue to be officially defined units, they are no longer used for administrative purposes. The last boundary change of a barony in Carlow was in 1841, when the barony of St. Mullin's was divided into St. Mullin's Lower and St. Mullin's Upper. Their official status is illustrated by Placenames Orders made since 2003, where official Irish names of baronies are listed under "Administrative units". The largest barony in Carlow is Idrone East, at 52,857 acres (214 km2), and the smallest barony is St. Mullin's Upper, at 7,784 acres (32 km2).

- Carlow (Ceatharlach)
- Forth (Fotharta)
- Idrone East (Uí Dhróna Thoir)
- Idrone West (Uí Dhróna Thiar)
- Rathvilly (Ráth Bhil)
- St. Mullin's Lower (Tigh Moling Íochtarac)
- St. Mullin's Upper (Tigh Moling Uachtarach)

=== Civil parishes and townlands ===
Townlands are the smallest officially defined geographical divisions in Ireland. There are 650 townlands in Carlow, of which 22 are historic town boundaries. These town boundaries are registered as their own townlands and are much larger than rural townlands. The rural townlands of Carlow range from just 1 acre in size (Acuan) to 1,822 acres (Kilbrannish South), with the average size of a townland in the county (excluding towns) being 371 acres.

=== Towns and villages ===
- Aghade
- Ardattin
- Bagenalstown
- Ballinabranna
- Ballinkillin
- Ballon
- Ballymurphy
- Borris
- Carlow
- Carrickduff
- Clonmore
- Clonegal
- Fennagh
- Hacketstown
- Kildavin
- Leighlinbridge
- Myshall
- Nurney
- Old Leighlin
- Palatine
- Rathvilly
- Royal Oak
- St Mullin's
- Tinnahinch
- Tinryland
- Tullow

== Governance and politics ==
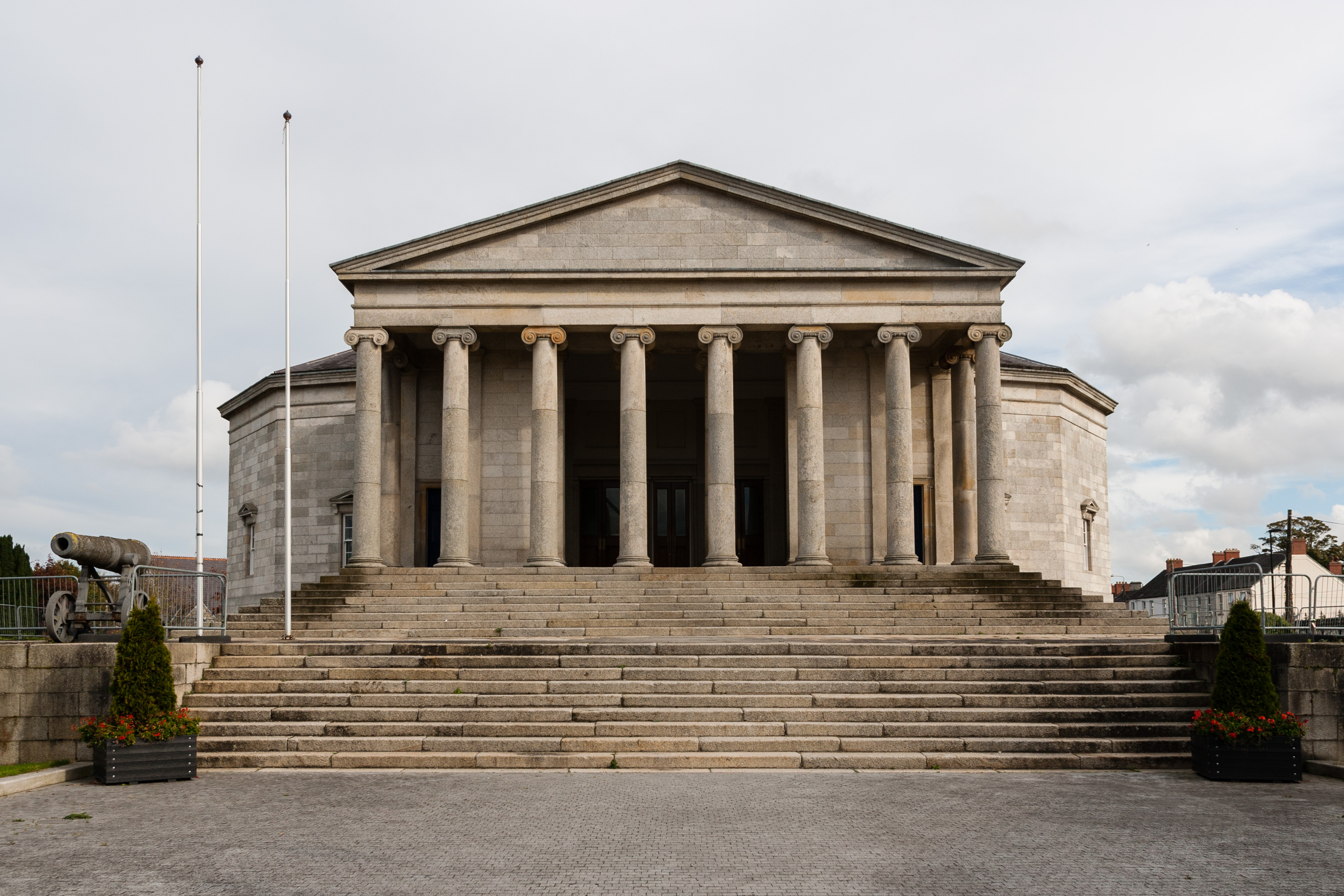
Carlow Courthouse

=== Local government ===
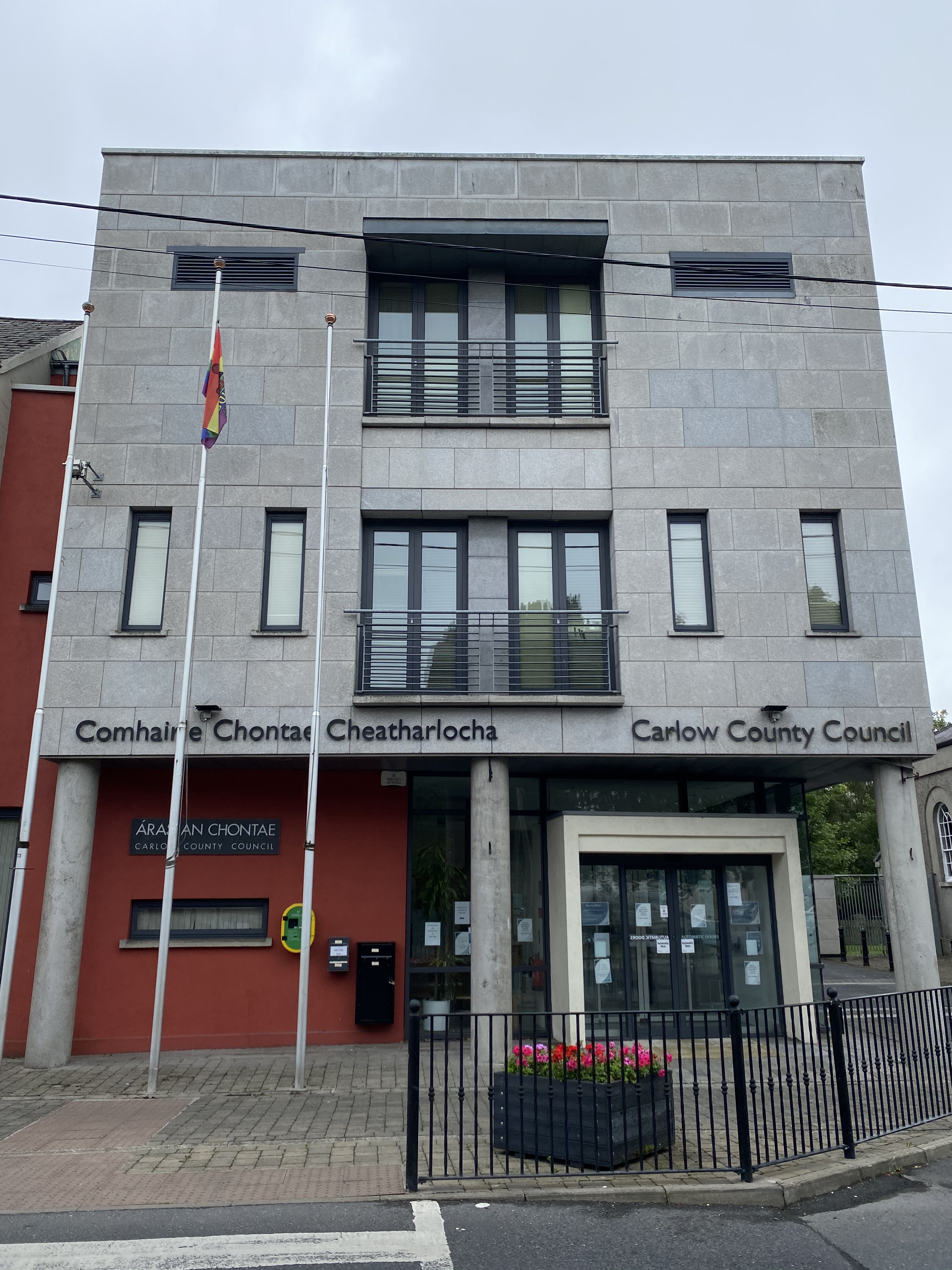
County Buildings, Carlow

Local government in County Carlow is governed by the Local Government Acts. There is a single level of local government in the county, with Carlow County Council responsible for local services.

There are 18 councillors on the county council. It is currently divided into three local electoral areas (LEAs), each of which is also a municipal district: Carlow (7), Muine Bheag (5) and Tullow (6).

Council elections are held every 5 years, with the next election due to be held in June 2029. The 2024 Carlow local election had a voter turnout of 47.5%, a decrease of 1.9% on the 2019 local election. The highest turnout was at Muine Bheag (51.3%) and the lowest was at Carlow (43.5%).

Results of the 2024 Carlow County Council election
Party	Seats	FPv%	% Change since 2019	Seat Change since 2019
Fine Gael	6	27.8%	▼3.5%	Steady
Fianna Fáil	5	29.8%	▼3.7%	▼1
Sinn Féin	2	12.0%	▲3.6%	▲1
Labour	1	4.8%	▼4.1%	▼1
People Before Profit	1	2.6%	▲0.6%	Steady
Independent Ireland	1	2.6%	New	New
Independent	2	14.7%	▲1.7%	Steady

As was the case in much of Ireland, Fianna Fáil and Fine Gael emerged as the two dominant parties in the 2024 local elections, holding 11 of the 18 seats between them. Sinn Féin hold 2 seats, the Labour Party, People Before Profit, and Independent Ireland hold 1 seat each, and there are 2 independents.

As part of the Southern Region (NUTS II Region), the council has two representatives on the Southern Regional Assembly, where it is part of the South-East strategic planning area (NUTS III Region).

=== Former districts ===
It was formerly divided into the rural districts of Baltinglass No. 2, Carlow, and Idrone, and the urban district of Carlow. The rural districts were abolished in 1925. Bagnelstown (Muine Bheag) and Tullow, within the former rural district of Carlow, had town commissioners. The town of Tullow was later disestablished as separate area. In 2002, the urban district of Carlow and the town commissioners of Muinebheag became town councils. All town councils in Ireland were abolished in 2014.

=== National elections ===
Carlow is part of the Dáil constituency of Carlow–Kilkenny which returns 5 TDs. The constituency has been in existence since the 1948 general election.

Prior to 1801, the county was represented in the Irish House of Commons through the constituencies of County Carlow, Carlow and the bishop's borough of Old Leighlin, each of which returned two MPs. Following the Act of Union, the county was represented in Westminster through the County Carlow constituency, which returned two MPs (reduced to one under the Redistribution of Seats Act 1885. It was this constituency that gave Carlow representation in the First Dáil, convened in 1919.

It was part of the Dáil constituency of Carlow-Kilkenny from 1921 to 1937. Between 1937 and 1948 the county was divided, with the northern half of the county part of the Carlow-Kildare constituency, and the southern half joining the Wexford constituency. Since 1948, the county has again been joined with Kilkenny for national elections as Carlow–Kilkenny. From 1997 to 2020, a portion of the county was in the Wicklow, rejoining the rest of Carlow at the 2020 general election.

Carlow is part of the European Parliament constituency of South (5 seats).

== History ==
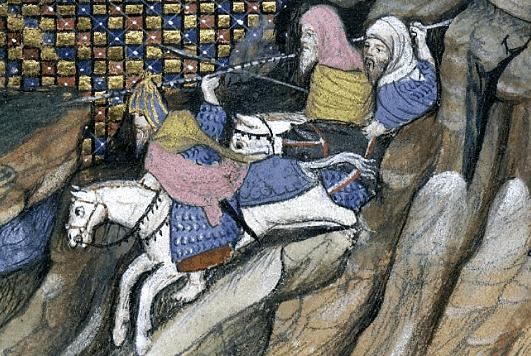
Art MacMurrough-Kavanagh, King of Leinster

The area of present-day Carlow has been inhabited for thousands of years, and the county has perhaps the highest concentration of megalithic monuments per square kilometre in Ireland. Numerous standing stones, bullauns and cairns mark the landscape. Carlow is nicknamed the "Dolmen County", reflecting the abundance of dolmens found within its borders, of which the Brownshill Dolmen is reputed to be the largest in Europe. The historic clan territories of the county included Uí Drona (O'Ryan), Fothairt Feadh (O'Nolan), Uí Ceinnselaig (Kinsella), Dál Coirpri Cliach (Kerwick), Uí Bairrche Magh dá chonn (Kearney), Uí Felmeda Tuaidh (O'Garvey) and Uí Bairrch Maige hAilbe (O'Gorman). As Carlow contained both the navigable river Barrow as well as the Slighe Cualann (one of the key arterial roads leading to Tara), control of the area was vital to the claim of any prospective king of Leinster, and the area was much fought over. By the 11th century the Mac Murchada branch of the Uí Ceinnselaig dynasty had firmly established themselves as the Kings of Leinster.

=== Emergence as a County ===
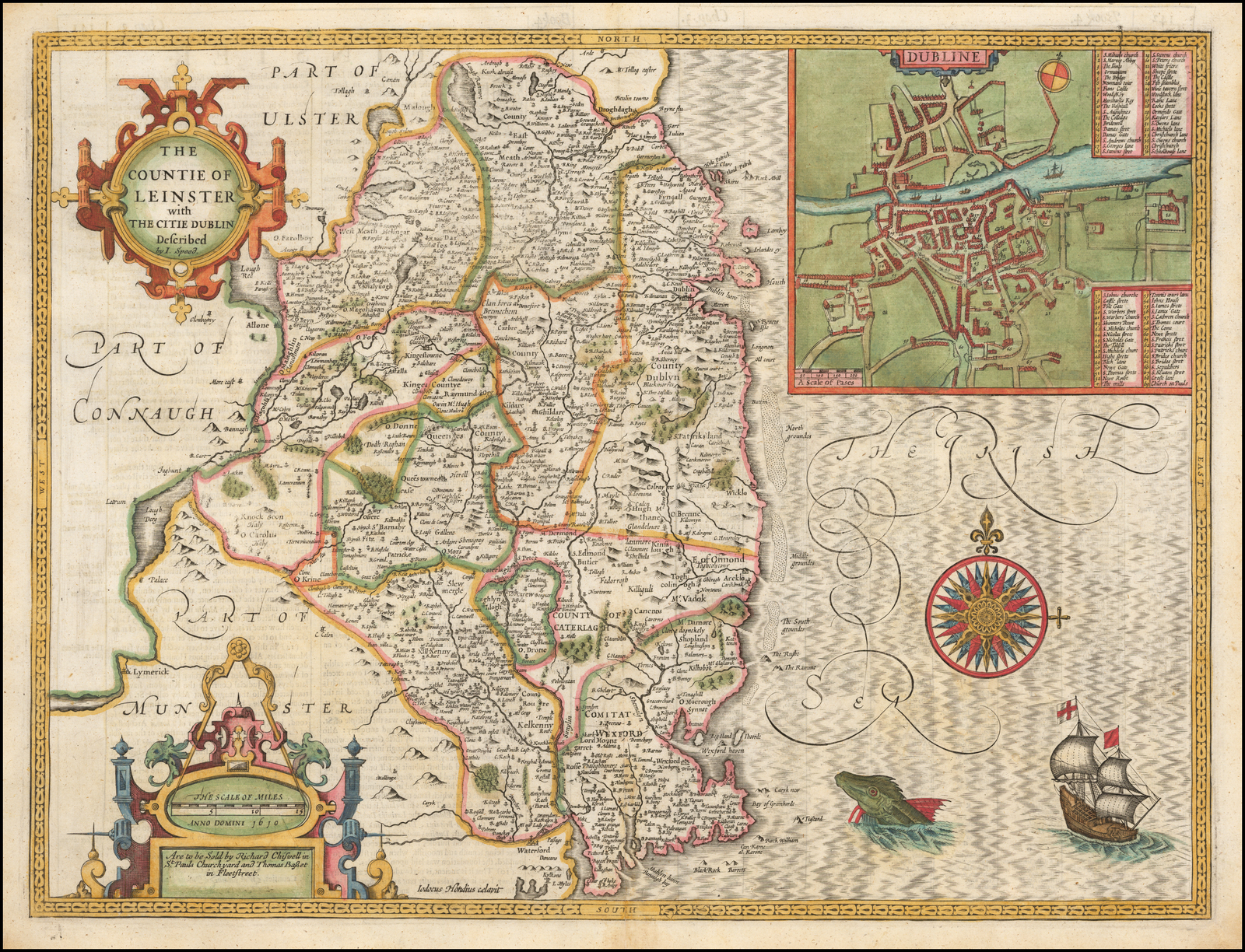
Early 17th-century map showing Carlow extending to the Irish Sea. The creation of Wicklow in 1606 not yet reflected

With the exception of a short-lived Norse–Gael settlement near St. Mullin's in the 9th century, the area remained under the control of the Kingdom of Leinster until the early 13th century. Following the Norman conquest, the "Borough of Carlow" was founded in July 1210, and formed part of the Norman palatine county of Leinster. This was later divided and the independent Liberty of Carlow was established in 1247. At that time the county was over three times larger than it is today, covering approximately 724,000 acres (2,930 km^{2}) and encompassing the majority of the old Diocese of Leighlin, extending to and including the coastal area around Arklow.

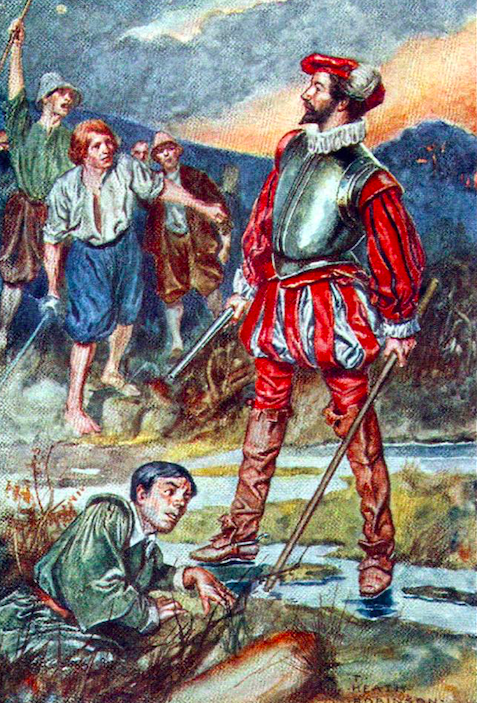
Sir Edmund Butler led a revolt in 1569 after his lands were granted to an English settler

The modern county boundary was shaped by the Gaelic Resurgence from the 14th to 16th centuries. During this period, Carlow was part of the patrimony of the Anglo-Norman Butler dynasty; however Art MacMurrough-Kavanagh, the ascendant King of Leinster, controlled more than half of the liberty. He was paid by the Anglo-Normans for his "services" in keeping the roads and trade routes of the area free of bandits, but in reality this amounted to nothing more than rent exacted by MacMurrough-Kavanagh as recognition of his sovereignty over the area. His authority was so absolute that the MacMurrough-Kavanagh's retained control over large portions of the county for centuries, despite radical political changes. In the late 15th-century, James Butler, the 9th Earl of Ormond, purchased land within the county to give to his heirs, rather than enter into conflict with the dynasty. Descendants of the King of Leinster are still in possession of their ancestral home of Borris House to this day.

The informal alliance between the Kingdom of Leinster and the Anglo-Normans remained the status quo for decades, as it kept the peace and made both sides immensely wealthy. Cognisant of the political landscape, the Anglo-Normans began to marry into Gaelic families and adapt to native customs, forging alliances with Irish kingdoms to gain the upper hand over their fellow Anglo-Norman rivals. In a bid to halt the decline of English authority in the region, the crown made Carlow the capital of the Lordship of Ireland from 1361 until 1374, just 13 km (8.1 mi) north of MacMurrough-Kavanagh's permanent residence at Leighlin.

Large areas on the northern and eastern fringes of the Liberty of Carlow gradually fell completely to the O'Moores, O'Byrnes and other chiefdoms. Consequently, when the Tudors reconquered these areas in the mid 16th century ownership was not reverted to the Anglo-Normans of Carlow but was instead granted to settlers from Britain. Carlow retained its Irish Sea border, though control of this land became disputed with the ruling chiefs of the area who were petitioning for their own shire. These areas were eventually given over to County Wicklow in 1606. The present-day boundary of Carlow therefore represents the core Norman holdings in the area which had persisted since the 12th century, propped up by the Caomhánach dynasty.

=== Early modern history ===
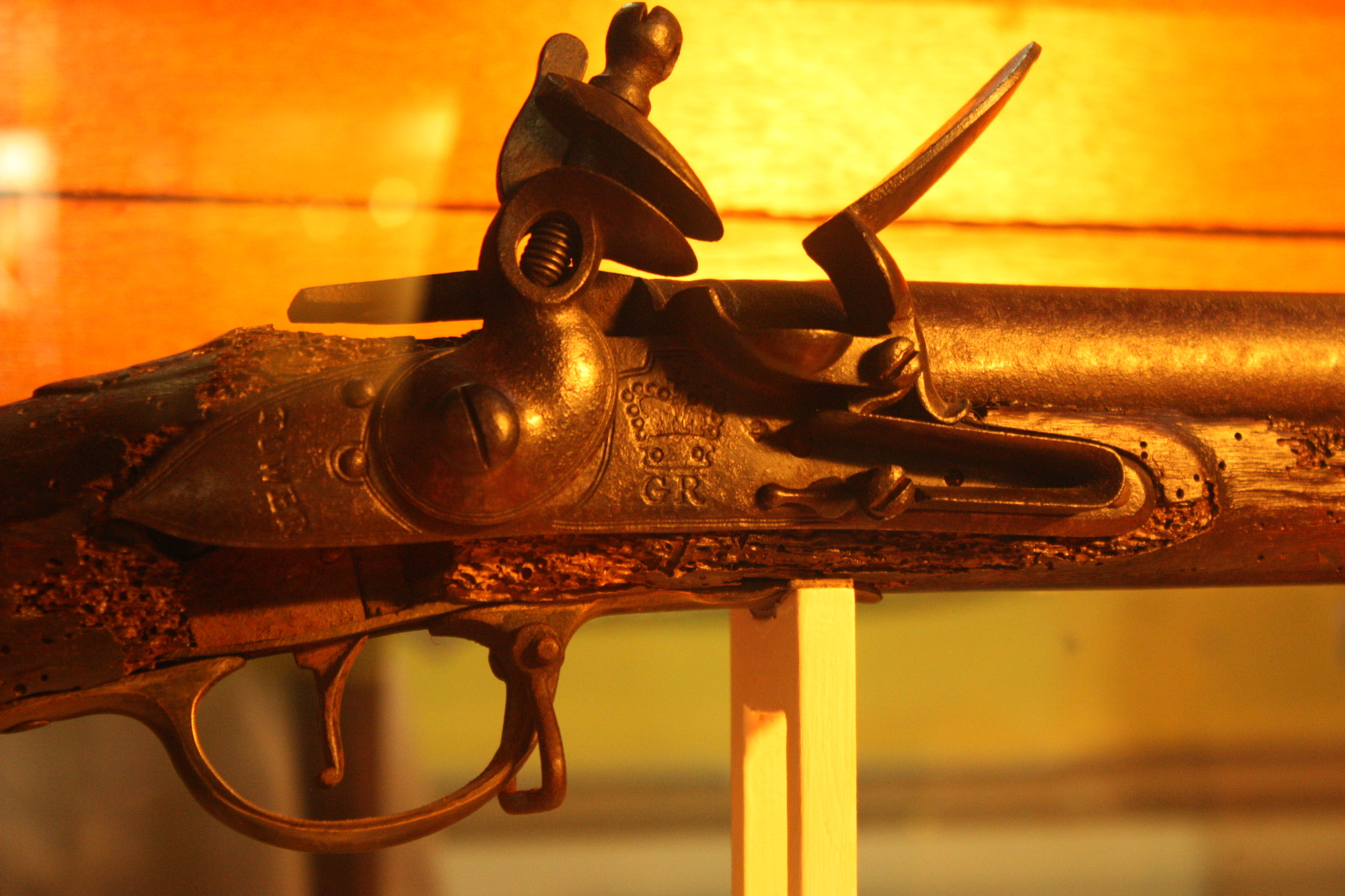
Brown Bess musket used in the 1798 Rebellion on display in the County Carlow Military Museum

Following the Irish Confederate Wars in the 1650s, the great majority of Gaelic Irish and Anglo-Norman landowners were dispossessed, and their lands were granted to English soldiers who took part in the Cromwellian conquest. Carlow was one of four counties set aside by the Commonwealth government for the payment of public debt, although much of the land in these counties eventually ended up in the hands of notable regicides, considered "friends of the Republic". These lands were legally deemed to be in the possession of King Charles II following the Restoration, and many dispossessed Irish nobles were able to petition the king and recover their lands. The Cromwellian conquest therefore had a limited impact on Carlow, as both Charles and the Parliament of Ireland had shown leniency to ordinary soldiers who were granted land elsewhere in Ireland, but all regicides were either exiled or executed.

Carlow, along with neighbouring Wexford, saw some of the fiercest fighting of the 1798 Rebellion. The rebellion in Carlow is particularly infamous for the sectarian excesses committed within the county. Prior to the rebellion, United Irishmen member William Farrell had claimed "there was no part of Ireland where a better feeling of friendship existed between both Catholics and Protestants, nor no part where greater numbers of both were blood relations". However, in the wake of the French Revolution, local members of the Orange Order organised into a Yeomanry Cavalry Corps which conducted nightly raids on Catholic and Dissenter homes, often burning them to the ground, in search of weapons and revolutionary literature.

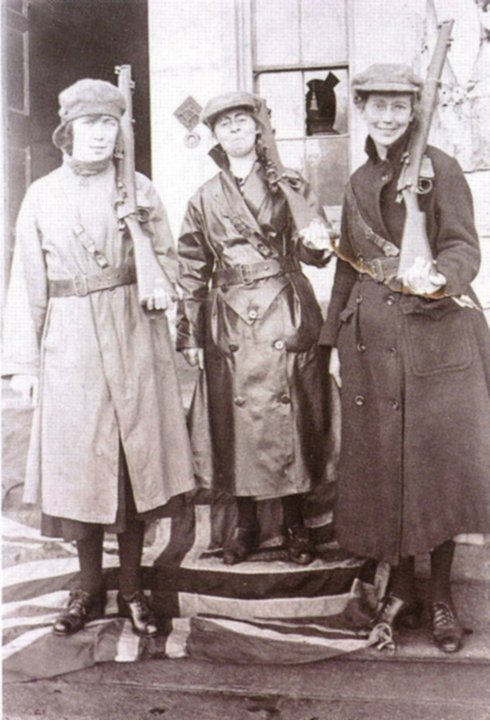
Cumann na mBan members standing on the Union Jack in Duckett's Grove, 1921

As feelings of persecution and religious division grew amongst the overwhelmingly Catholic populace, local United Irish leader Laurence Griffin lamented "the people of Carlow think of all Protestants as Orangemen". Catholics and non-Anglican Protestants could not vote to effect change, so they eventually joined forces with radical liberal Anglicans to overthrow the Parliament. The Battle of Carlow was one of the opening skirmishes of the rebellion in May 1798, and ended in a crushing defeat for the rebel forces. Months of intimidation and revenge attacks followed, led by Reverend Robert Rochfort of Clogrennan House, who oversaw the unlawful kidnapping, torture and execution of suspected United Irishmen, earning Rochfort the nickname "the slashing parson".

The Irish language was still spoken in Carlow as late as the 1870s.

=== Revolutionary Period ===
During the War of Independence, the Carlow Brigade of the Irish Republican Army (IRA) had 6 battalions which operated in the shadow of the Curragh Camp – the British Army's headquarters in Ireland – across Carlow, western Wicklow, southern Kildare and eastern Laois and Kilkenny. The abandoned estate at Duckett's Grove served as both an IRA training camp and the headquarters of the Carlow Brigade from 1919 to 1922.

Plagued by poor supply-lines and hindered by a heavy Royal Irish Constabulary (RIC) presence, the Carlow Brigade was one of the least active of the war and mostly specialised in delaying tactics such as blocking roads, destroying bridges and intercepting mail. The brigade carried out a botched ambush near Ballymurphy in April 1921, with the loss of 12 members (4 killed and 8 captured) and vital munitions, after which no further active engagements with either the RIC or British Army were attempted.

The Carlow Republican District Court, established in February 1922 at the Carlow Courthouse, was the first post-independence court held by the government of the Irish Free State. Carlow saw relatively little action during the Civil War, as the Free State Army deployed hundreds of soldiers to the former RIC strongholds within the county, effectively strangling the Irregulars. The first head of an independent Irish-Government, President of the Executive Council W. T. Cosgrave, served as TD for Carlow–Kilkenny from 1921 to 1927.

== Places of interest ==
=== Landmarks ===
==== Prehistoric era ====
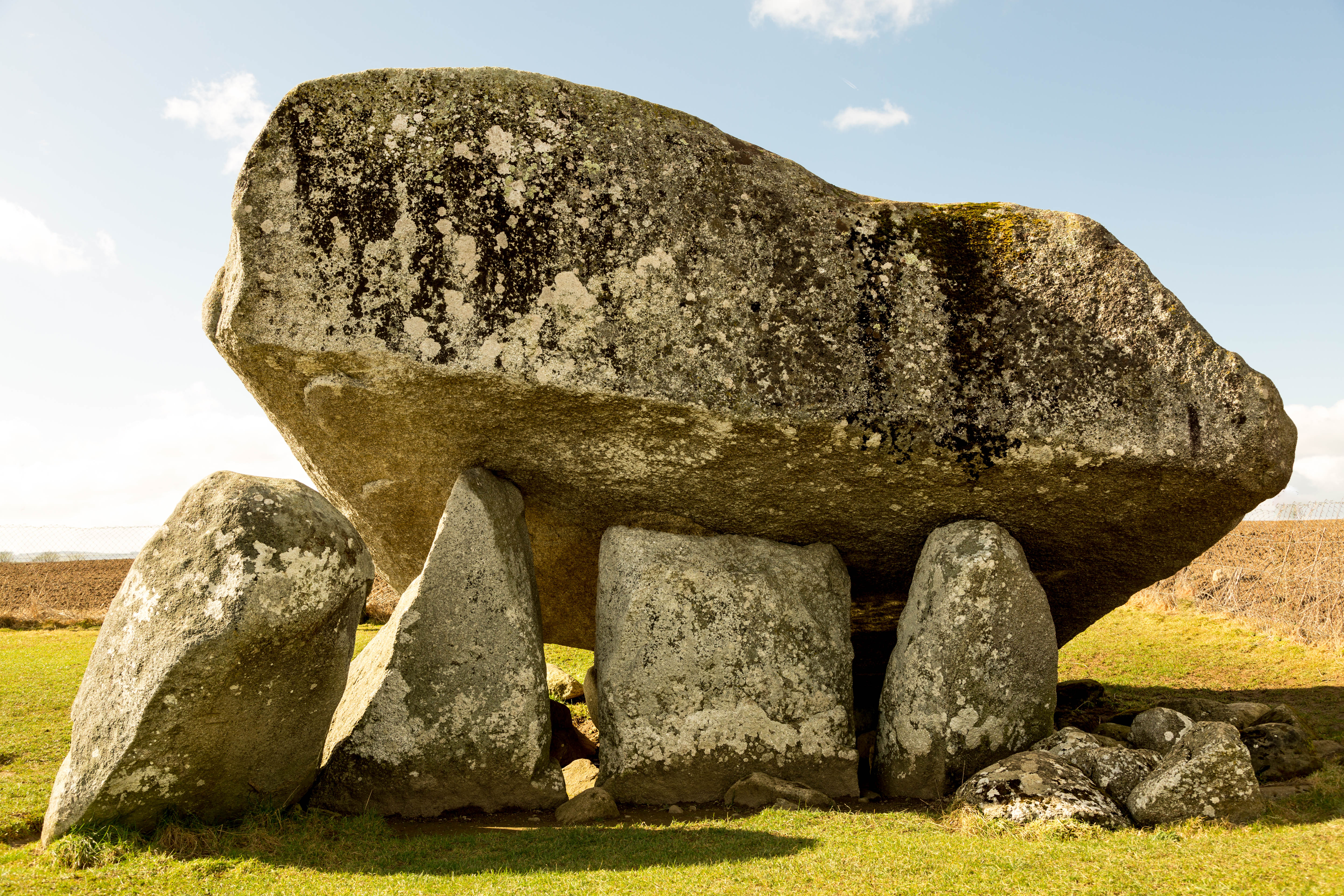
Brownshill Dolmen, c. 4,000 BC

Carlow is nicknamed the "Dolmen County", reflecting the abundance of dolmens found within its borders. Dolmens or "portal tombs" are above-grove burial chambers which were used by Neolithic farming communities. The Brownshill Dolmen, situated on the Hacketstown Road (R726), has a capstone which weighs an estimated 100 metric tons, and is reputed to be the heaviest in Europe. The tomb is listed as a national monument. There are at least 10 megalithic tombs within the county, of which 7 are dolmens. Carlow and Kilkenny have 14 dolmens between them, many of which are among the most impressive in Ireland. This is unusual for such a small area. In contrast, County Galway, over twice the size of Carlow and Kilkenny combined, has 7 dolmens, and Cork – Ireland's largest county – has just 2. This suggests that the fertile plains of the Barrow and its tributaries were well inhabited during the prehistoric era.

A wealth of Neolithic, Mesolithic and Bronze Age artefacts were discovered during excavations for the M9 Carlow Bypass in 2006. A total of 57 archaeological sites were identified along the proposed route and yielded a variety of relics, including flint arrowheads and bone scrapers, pottery, hammers and axeheads made of granite and an Iron Age glass bead. These artefacts are now housed in the Carlow County Museum. Their discovery a significant distance from any water sources revealed that the extent of early settlement in the area was more widespread than previously thought.

Numerous surviving Ogham stones dot the landscape of the county. The stones use Ogham inscription to record personal names, and were most likely commemorative monuments to the deceased individual. Many of the stones are inscribed with Old Irish, but some have been distinctly "Christianised" through the influence of local monastic settlements, such as the Rathglass Ogham Stone which reads "Donaidonas Maqi Mariani" – Donaidonas son of. Marianus. The stones are typically cut from weather-resistant granite, although they are not immune to decay. The Patrickswell Ogham Stone, believed to have been associated with the Waterstown ecclesiastical site, is now illegible.

==== Religious Structures ====
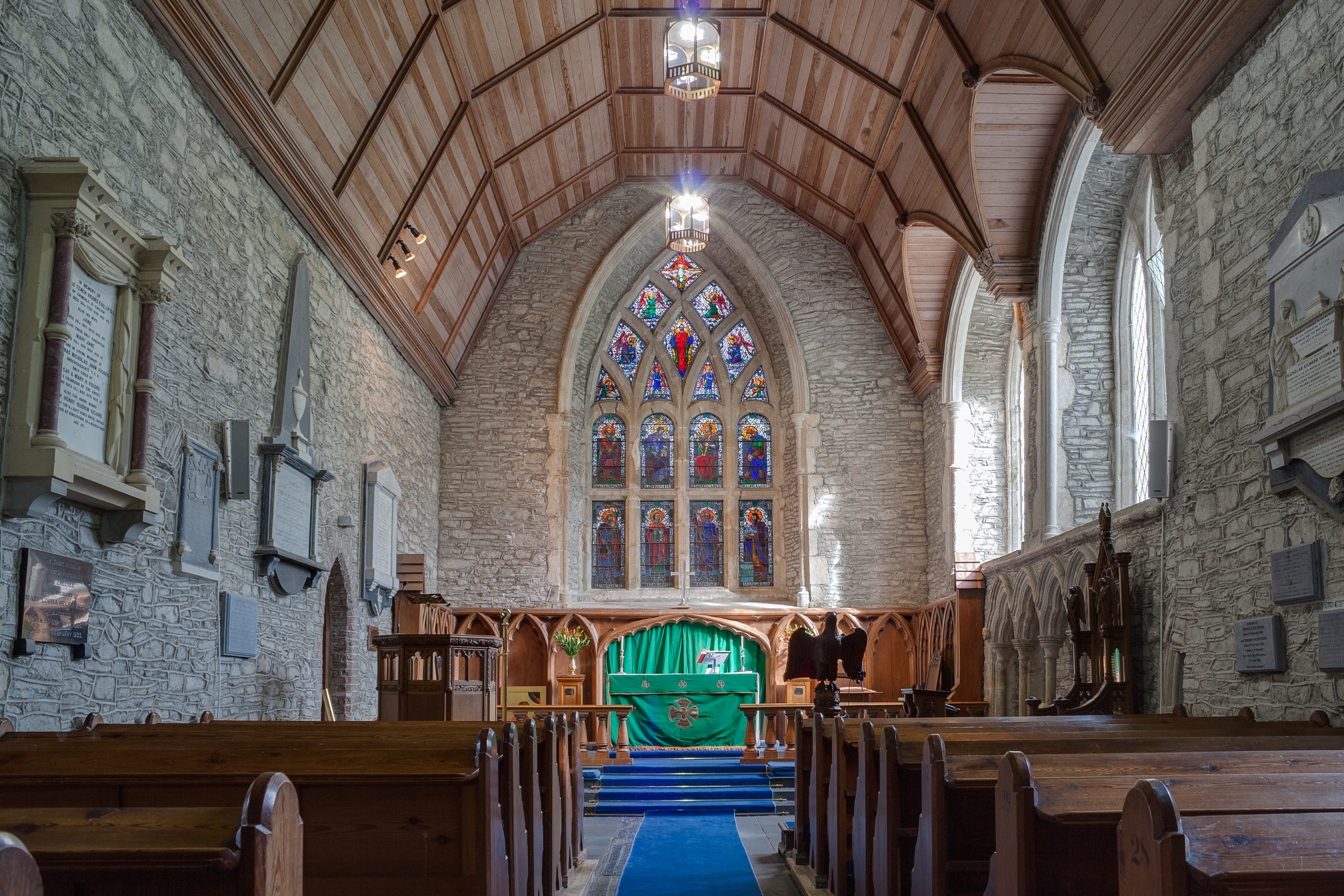
12th-century St Laserian's Cathedral

Early Christian settlements were founded throughout Carlow from the 5th to 7th century. An extensive monastic site is located at St Mullin's in the southern tip of the county. The village is named after Saint Moling, who founded a monastery there in the early 7th century. The monastery was said to have been built with the help of "Gobán Saor", the legendary Irish builder. An 8th-century manuscript, The Book of Mulling, contains a plan of the monastery – the earliest known plan of an Irish monastery – which shows four crosses inside and eight crosses outside the circular monastic wall.

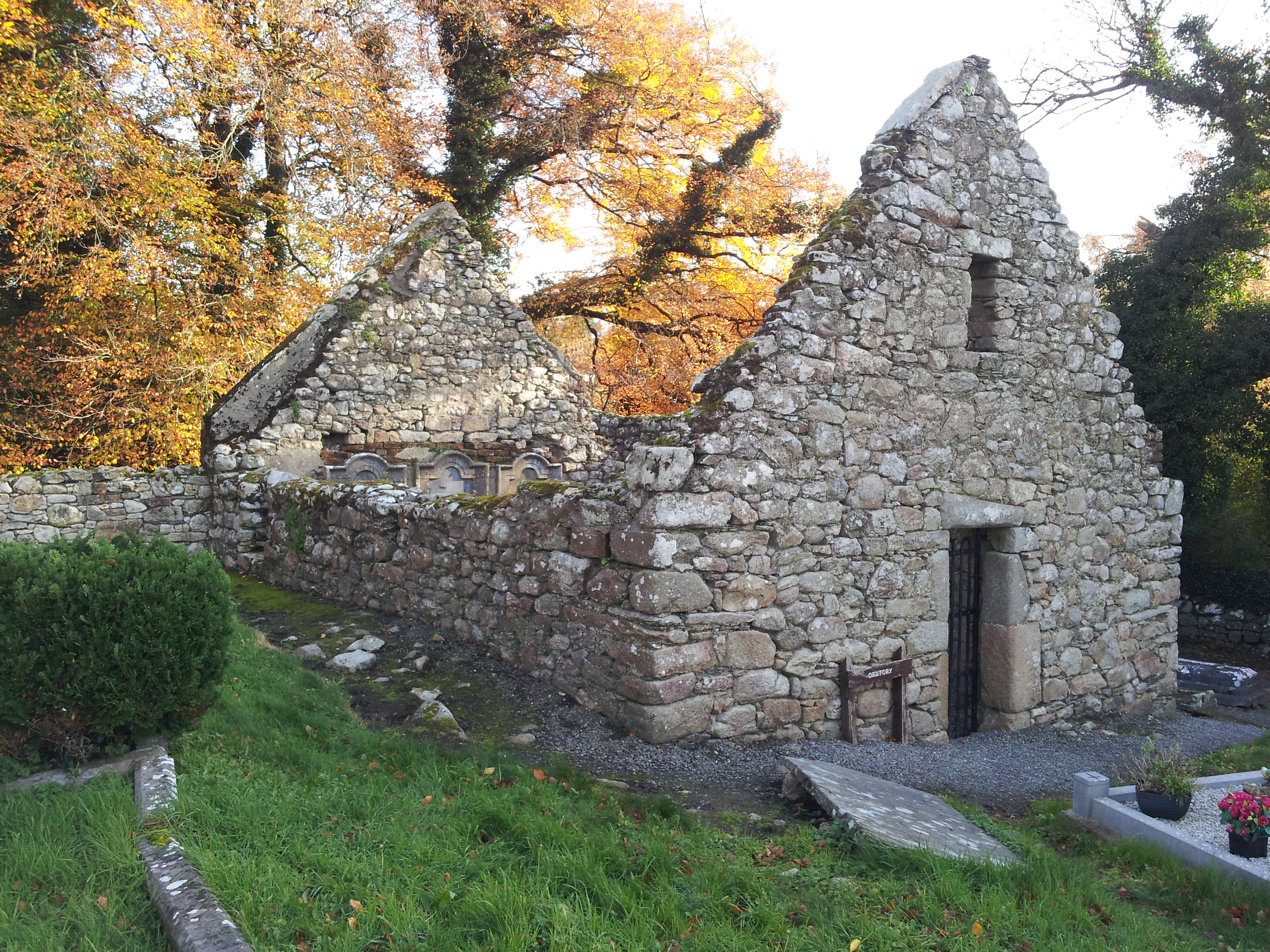
7th-century Monastic Site at St. Mullin's

Old Leighlin was the site of one of the largest monastic settlements in Ireland, founded by St Goban in the 6th century. In 630 AD a church synod was held at Old Leighlin which determined the date of Easter. The main abbey of Old Leighlin was destroyed by fire in 1060 and replaced in the 12th century with St Laserian's Cathedral. The cathedral remains in use to this day and was modified over centuries, with each change adding unique elements to the building. Among the most recent additions are the stained glass windows created by Catherine Amelia O'Brien in 1934. Once the cathedral church of the former Diocese of Leighlin, it is now one of the six cathedrals in the Diocese of Cashel and Ossory of the Church of Ireland.

The remote abbey of Clonmore was founded in the 6th century by Máedóc of Ferns. It flourished until the 11th century and taught Saint Finian Lobhar as well as Saint Oncho, who is buried at the site. While the monastery's buildings have long since been demolished, a substantial cemetery remains which includes high crosses, ogham stones, ballaun stones and numerous inscribed grave slabs from Early Christian Ireland.

Another monastery was established by Saint Comhgall in 634 and is located in present-day Carlow town. The Normans built a stone wall around the town in the 13th century. The monastery, which was by that stage in ruins, lay just outside of it. The burial grounds survive today at Castle Hill and a new church was built at the site in 1727, known as St. Mary's Church. A 59.5 m (195 ft) spire was added in 1834, which remains the tallest building in the county.

The Cathedral of the Assumption in Carlow town was built in a Gothic Revival style in the early 1800s and is the cathedral church of the Roman Catholic Diocese of Kildare and Leighlin. It once boasted a 6 m (20 ft)-tall ornately carved wooden pulpit, which is now on display in the Carlow County Museum and was featured in A History of Ireland in 100 Objects, a national project which identified one hundred archaeological or cultural objects that are important to Irish history.

==== Castles ====
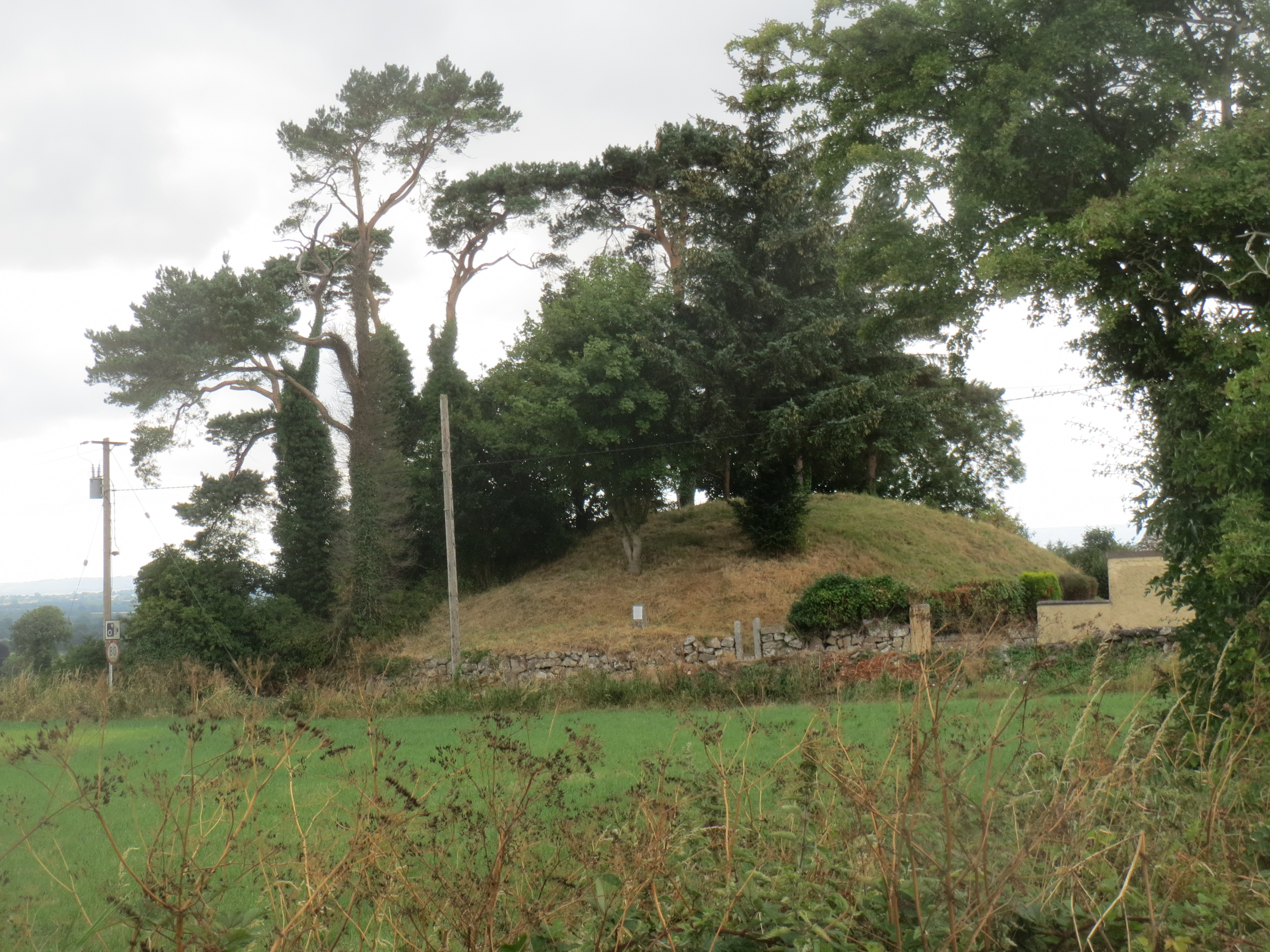
5th-century Motte in Rathvilly

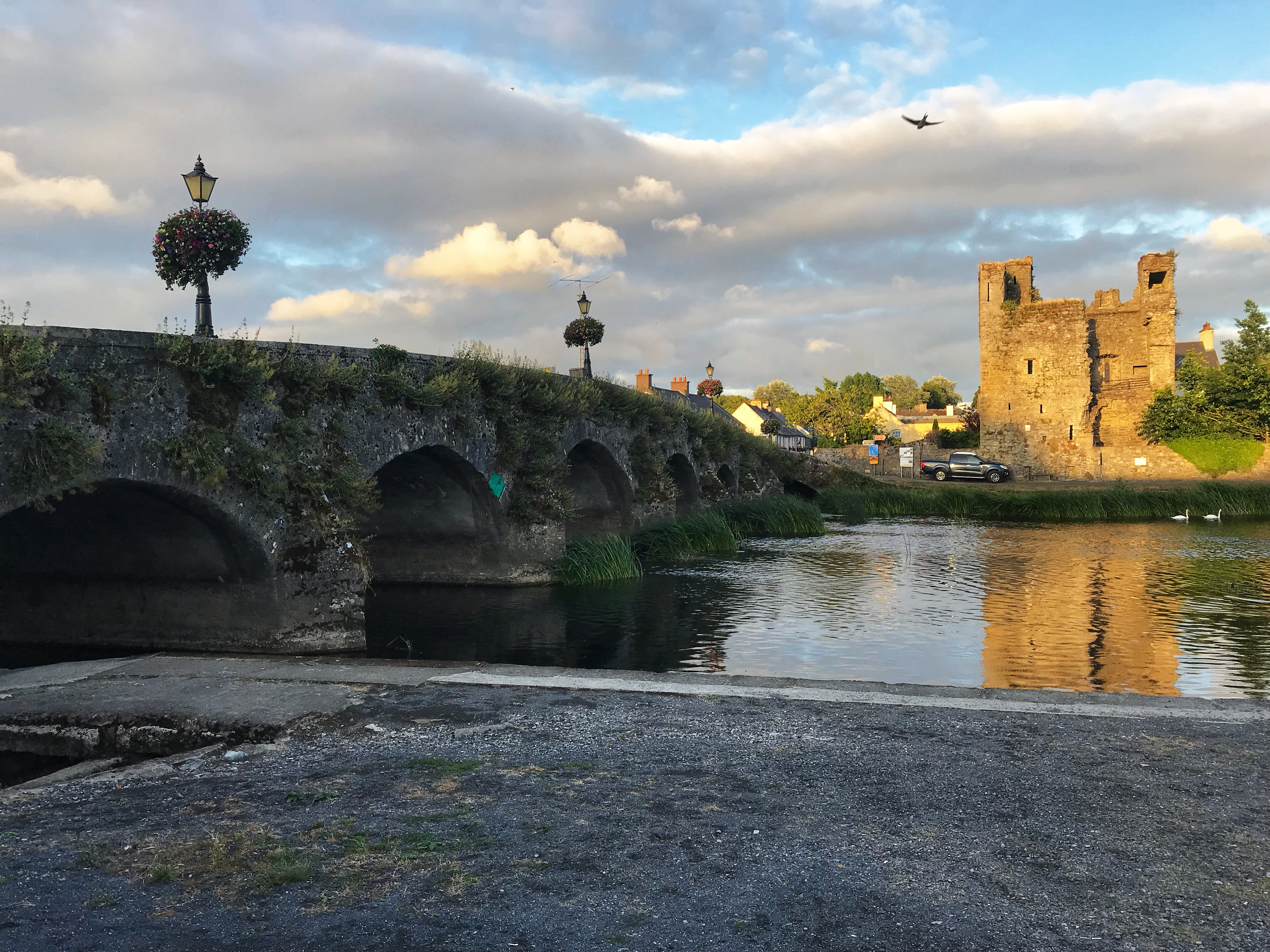
Leighlinbridge Castle

The oldest known castles within the county date from the first few centuries AD. The two most common forms of early defensive structures were ringforts and Motte-and-bailey castles. This style of fortification remained prevalent for centuries, persisting even after the Norman Invasion in the 12th century.

The Rathvilly Moat, constructed in the 400s, was home to Crimthann mac Énnai, King of Leinster. The town of Rathvilly itself is named after an unknown historic ringfort, derived from the Irish (Irish: Ráth Bhile, meaning 'ringfort of the trees').

The arrival of the Normans was followed by the widespread construction of stone castles and tower houses throughout Ireland. These structures did not entirely supplant the earlier forms of fortification, as evidenced by Castlemore Moat, which is an example of a much later Motte-and-bailey. It was built by Raymond FitzGerald in the 12th century following his conquest of O'Nolan lands in the Barony of Forth.

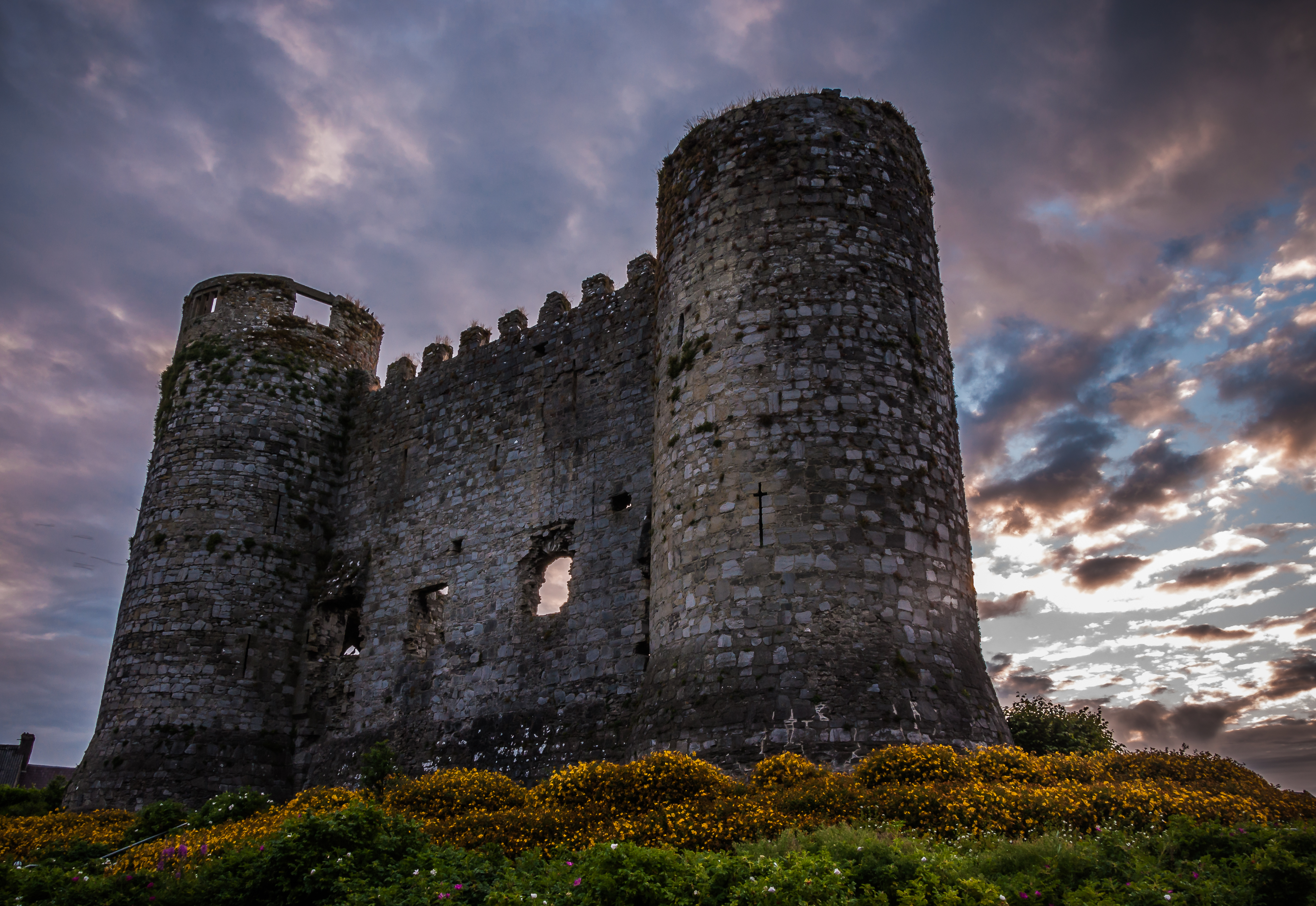
Carlow Castle, built in 1213, was the first Norman-style four towered keep in Britain or Ireland

Although stone castles were generally of far superior quality, wooden structures were still favoured by the more mobile Irish kingdoms, as they could be easily constructed and abandoned when necessary. As late as the 1370s, the King of Leinster, Art McMurrough-Kavanagh, is recorded as residing in a large wooden fortress in the woods near Old Leighlin.

For six centuries, Carlow Castle was the oldest and most imposing stone castle in the county. Built from 1207 to 1213, the town of Carlow grew around it, and it once stood as the centrepiece of the walled medieval town, complete with four towers (of which two survive). The castle endured numerous sieges and conquests, and changed hands dozens of times throughout its history, remaining intact. In 1812 the castle was leased to Dr. Phillip Parry Price Middleton, who intended to convert it into a psychiatric hospital. In an ill-fated attempt at remodelling, Middleton used gunpowder to create cut-and-cover tunnels beneath the castle. This undermined the castle's foundations and its entire eastern side collapsed into rubble. It lay abandoned until the Office of Public Works renovated the site in the 1990s.

Other notable castles and castle ruins which are listed as National Monuments include the 15th century Leighlinbridge Castle, around which the town of Leighlinbridge grew; Ballymoon Castle, which was constructed in the 13th century near Muine Bheag; and Ballyloughan Castle which belonged to the Kavanagh dynasty until the 16th century.

==== Estates and Manor Houses ====
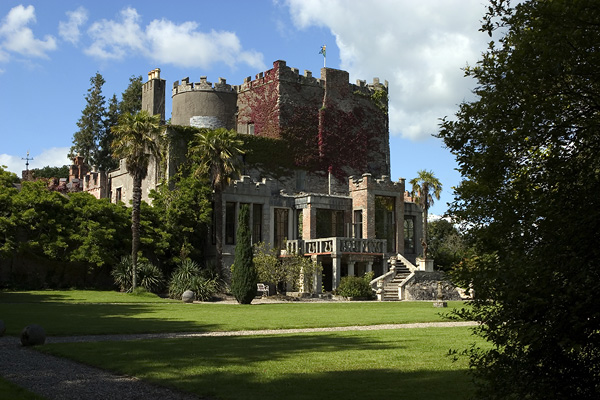
Built in 1625, Huntington Castle is an early example of a plantation home

Carlow was at the epicentre of the estates period of the late-18th and 19th centuries, and the county had a greater number of country houses and demesnes per hectare than any other rural county in Ireland. These "Big Houses" and their occupants dominated the economic and political landscape until the turn of the 20th century. Although the term was never applied at the time, historian Jimmy O'Toole refers to Carlow as "the most gentrified county in Ireland" due to the concentration of aristocratic families and their grand estates within its borders.

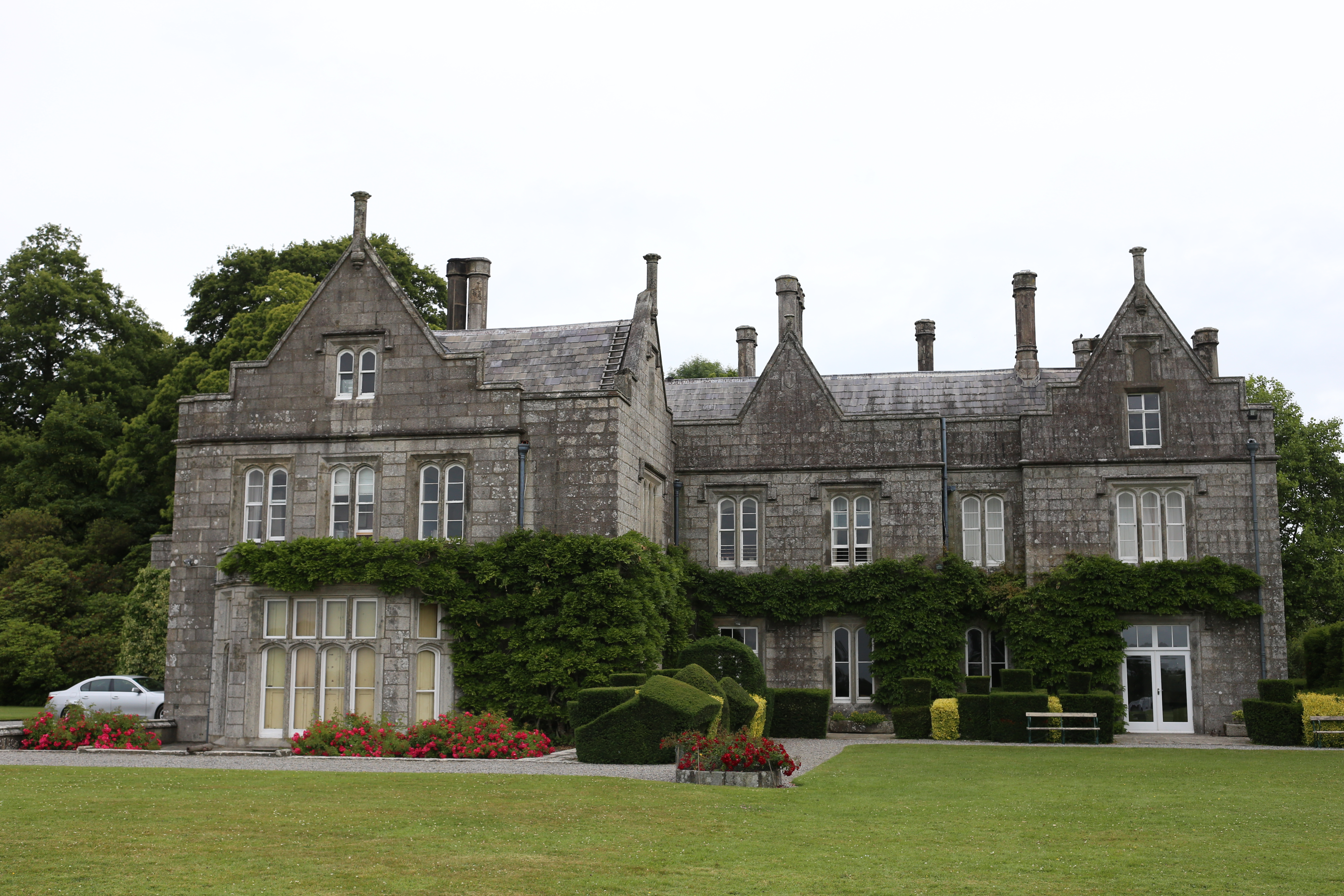
19th-century Lisnavagh House, a typical Anglo-Irish big house

A valuation survey undertaken in 1876 revealed that just 21 families owned 34,031 ha (84,090 acres) – almost 40% of the entire county. Although not as prevalent as in other counties, absenteeism by the landholding class in Carlow was still common. Towards the end of the 19th century, anger at high-rents and the widespread eviction of tenant farmers in Ireland resulted in the Land War (1879–1882) and the formation of the Irish National Land League led by Charles Stewart Parnell, which heralded the end of the estates period.

While as many as 300 Big Houses across Ireland were burned down during the revolutionary period, Carlow was left relatively untouched, losing just three Big Houses between 1919 and 1923, two of which were unoccupied. Éamon de Valera was against such burnings and addressed supporters at the gates of Browne's Hill House in January 1923, stating that "nothing was to be achieved by the burning or damaging of homes, big or small... raid for arms, yes, but leave them as they found them".

Some of the most prominent Big Houses are currently in public ownership, such as Altamont House, Oak Park and Duckett's Grove. Several historically significant Big Houses such as Borris House, Huntington Castle and Dunleckney Manor are privately owned but open to tours and visitors at certain times of year. The majority of the surviving Big Houses within the county are in use as either private residences or hotels, while a small number have been abandoned and are in a derelict state.

=== Natural Attractions ===
==== Gardens and Trails ====
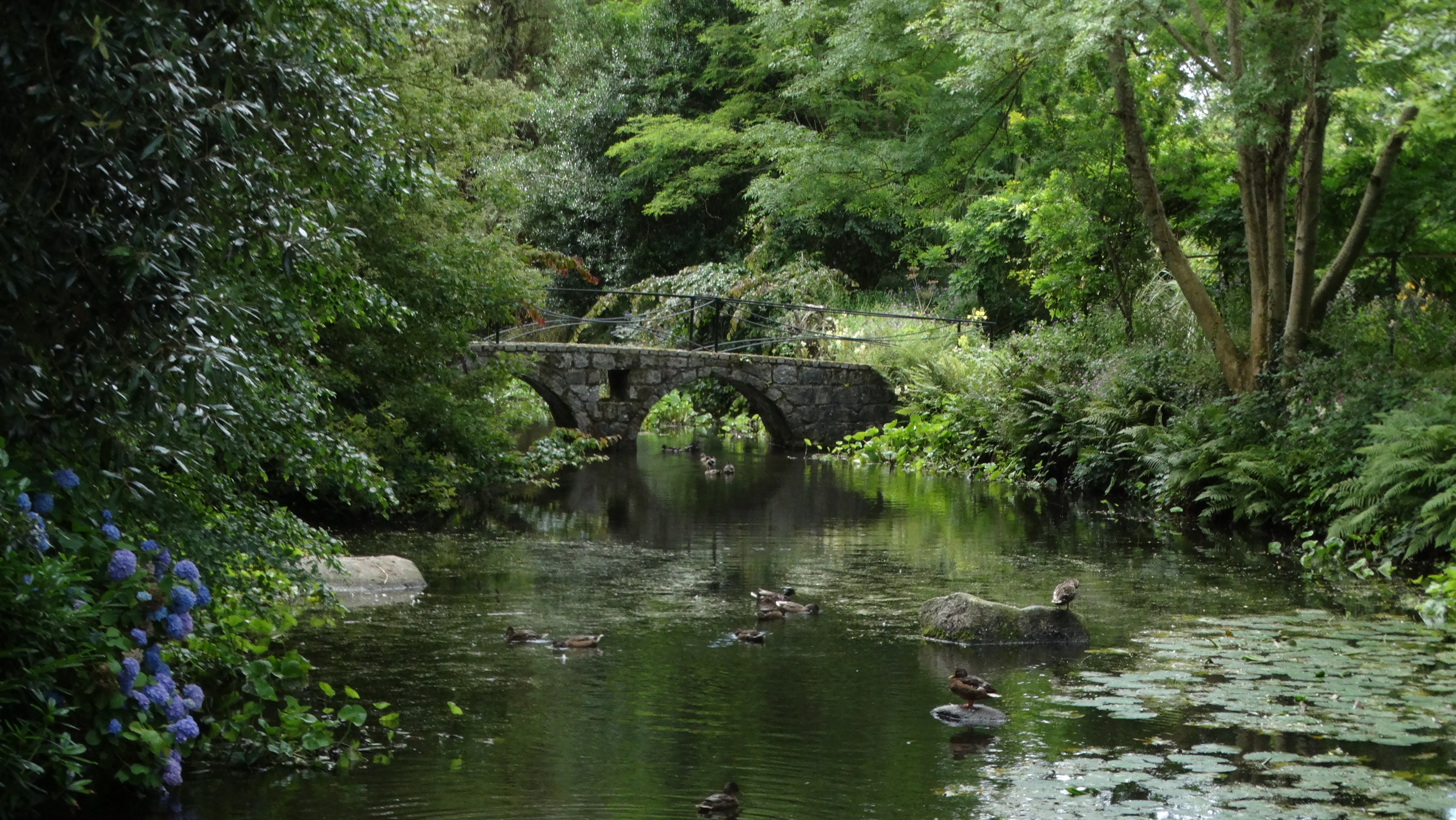
Altamont Gardens

The Carlow Garden Trail features 21 gardens and curated woodlands of former estate houses located within the county. Gardens include the Delta Sensory Gardens in Carlow town, the Edinburgh Woollen Mills Arboretum in Leighlinbridge, the Borris House gardens and woodlands, Lucy's Wood and the Newtownbarry House gardens near Bunclody, the Kilgraney house gardens, the Hardymount house gardens and the Duckett's Grove gardens. The Robinsonian-style gardens of Altamont House are often referred to as "the jewel in Ireland's gardening crown".

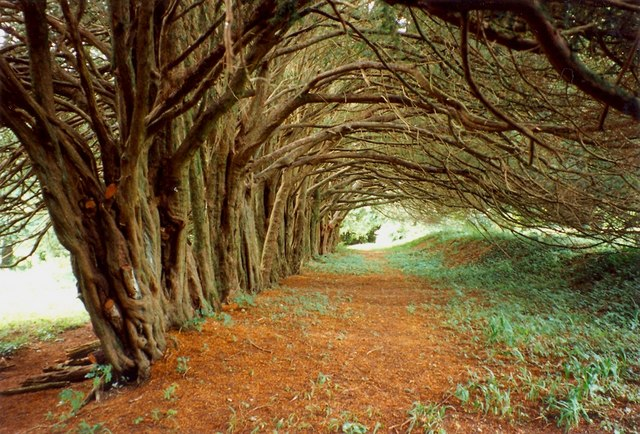
Yew grove at Clonegal, planted in the early 1600s

There are several long-distance trails which traverse the county. Ireland's flagship long-distance trail – the Wicklow Way – ends in Clonegal in northeastern Carlow, after crossing the Wicklow Mountains for 131 kilometres (81 miles). The Barrow Way follows the course of River Barrow for 100 kilometres (62 miles) from Robertstown, County Kildare to St Mullin's. The South Leinster Way begins at the foot of Mount Leinster near Kildavin, and runs for 104 kilometres (65 miles) before joining the River Suir at Carrick-on-Suir in County Tipperary.

The Blackstairs Mountains are a designated Special Areas of Conservation (SAC) and contain a diverse range of habitats which are protected under Irish and European law. These habitats range from dense forested areas to open heath and blanket bog. Vegetation within the range is limited to those adapted to the strong winds and often freezing temperatures of the mountain-tops, and include Western gorse (Ulex gallii), Ling heather (Calluna vulgaris) and Bell Heather (Erica cinerea). The last recorded Irish wolf was shot and killed in Fenagh after wandering down from Mount Leinster in 1786. Populations of Red deer and Feral goats roam the range; however, human intervention is required to control their population as they now lack natural predators.

Other natural features and wildlife habitats within Carlow which have been identified as proposed Natural Heritage Areas include Baggot's Wood, John's Hill, Ardristan Fen, the Ballymoon Esker, the Slaney River Valley and Cloghristick Wood.

== Demographics ==
Historical population
Year	Pop.	±%
1653	4,969	—
1659	5,434	+9.4%
1821	78,952	+1352.9%
1831	81,988	+3.8%
1841	86,228	+5.2%
1851	68,078	−21.0%
1861	57,137	−16.1%
1871	51,650	−9.6%
1881	46,568	−9.8%
1891	40,936	−12.1%
1901	37,748	−7.8%
1911	36,252	−4.0%
1926	34,476	−4.9%
1936	34,452	−0.1%
1946	34,081	−1.1%
1951	34,162	+0.2%
1956	33,888	−0.8%
1961	33,342	−1.6%
1966	33,593	+0.8%
1971	34,237	+1.9%
1979	38,668	+12.9%
1981	39,820	+3.0%
1986	40,988	+2.9%
1991	40,942	−0.1%
1996	41,616	+1.6%
2002	46,014	+10.6%
2006	50,349	+9.4%
2011	54,612	+8.5%
2016	56,932	+4.2%
2022	61,968	+8.8%

According to the Central Statistics Office, Carlow had a population of 61,968 in the 2022, an increase of 8.8% (+5,036) since the 2016 Census of Ireland. The population density of the county is 69.1 people per square kilometre; which, although slightly below the national average (71 people/km2), makes Carlow the 13th most densely populated of Ireland's 32 counties.

In 2022, 5.7 percent of the county's population was reported as younger than 5 years old, 27.2 percent were between 5 and 25, 52.0 percent were between 25 and 65, and 15.0 percent of the population was older than 65. A total of 2,073 people (3.4 percent) were over the age of 80. The population was evenly split between Females (50.26 percent) and Males (49.74 percent).

In 2021, there were 768 births within the county, and the average age of a first time mother was 30.5 years.

=== Ethnicity and Migration ===
Immigration from outside Ireland resulted in a net increase of 297 people, and migration from other counties produced a net increase of 2,673 people. Population growth from 2016 to 2022 included a natural increase of 839 (+1.35%) people since the last census, coupled with an increase of 7,746 people (+12.5%) due to net migration into the county. As of 2022, 43.6 percent of Carlow's residents were born within the county, 39.6 percent were born elsewhere in the State, and 16.8 percent were born outside of the Republic of Ireland.

The number of dual Irish citizens living in Carlow increased from 943 to 1,491 while non-Irish citizens accounted for 11% of the county's population.

In 2022, the racial composition of the county was:

- 89.3% White (78.5% White Irish, 9.9% Other White Background, 0.9% Irish Traveller)
- 2.2% Asian
- 1.6% Others including mixed
- 1.2% Black
- 5.8% Not stated

The largest foreign national groups by citizenship in Carlow are: Polish (3.47 percent), British (1.84 percent), Romanian (1.04 percent), Latvian (0.95 percent), Indian (0.48 percent) and American (0.47 percent).

=== Religion ===
Religion in Carlow – 2022
Religion	Percent
Roman Catholic	73.2%
None	10.8%
Other Christian	7.4%
Muslim	1.4%
Other Stated Religions	1.0%
Not Stated	6.2%

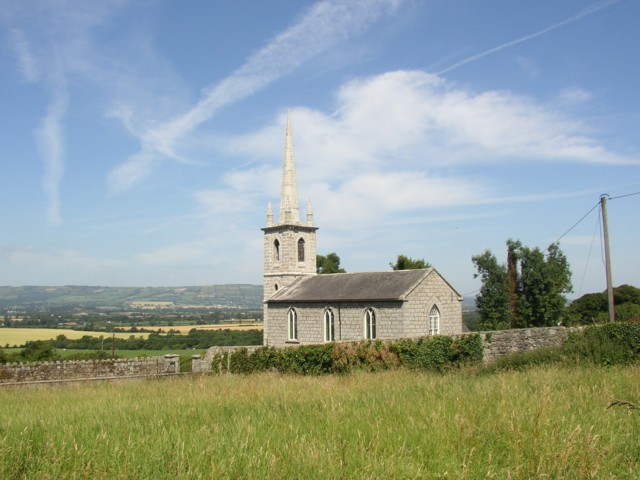
Small Church of Ireland oratory at Nurney

Within Carlow, 83% of residents identify with a religion, while 10.8% identified as having no religion. Additionally, 6.2% of people did not state their religion. Christianity and its various denominations was by far the largest religious group in the county, constituting 80.7% of the population. Islam was the only major non-Christian religion, with 826 adherents (1.4%).

The largest denomination by number of adherents in 2022 was the Roman Catholic Church with 44,957; followed by the Church of Ireland, England, Anglican and Episcopalian with 2,356, and Orthodox Christianity with 1,097 adherents. All other Christian denominations including Presbyterian, Pentecostal, Baptist, Evangelical and Methodist/Wesleyan had a combined 1,105 adherents. Aside from Islam, the largest non-Christian religions were Hinduism with 244 adherents, and Buddhism with 142 adherents. There were 162 adherents of all other religions. In the 2022 census, 3,800 people did not state their religion, a significant increase from 1,072 people in 2016.

The Cathedral of the Assumption in Carlow is the seat of the Roman Catholic Diocese of Kildare and Leighlin. Denis Nulty is the current bishop of Kildare and Leighlin. The 12th-century St Laserian's Cathedral in Old Leighlin was formerly the main cathedral of the Church of Ireland Diocese of Leighlin, but is now one of six cathedrals in the Diocese of Cashel and Ossory. The early 19th-century Scot's Church in Carlow town is the county's largest Presbyterian church, and the Carlow Islamic Cultural Centre is also located in Carlow town.

Continuing the trend which has been observed throughout Ireland since the Census of 2006, a significant increase in the number of people who identified as having no religion was observed between 2016 and 2022. This demographic increased by 68.2% from 3,941 in 2016 to 6,628 in 2022. People with no religion account for 10.8% of the county's population.

=== Urban areas ===
Carlow is the county town and by far the largest settlement, with approximately 44% of the county's population. It is the 12th largest urban area in the State and, excluding cities, the 7th largest town.

Under CSO classification, an "Urban Area" is a town with a population greater than 1,500. Despite having only three towns which qualify as urban areas, County Carlow is predominantly an urban county. As of the 2022 census, 57.2 percent of the county lived in urban areas (i.e. the three largest towns), and the remaining 42.8 percent lived in rural areas. Nearly two-thirds (65.6 percent) of the county's population live in the ten largest settlements.

Largest cities or towns in Carlow (2022 census) Source:
Rank		Barony	Pop.
1	Carlow	Carlow	27,351
2	Tullow	Rathvilly	5,138
3	Bagenalstown	Idrone East	2,945
4	Rathvilly	Rathvilly	1,074
5	Leighlinbridge	Idrone East	959
6	Ballon	Forth	801
7	Borris	Idrone East	702
8	Hacketstown	Rathvilly	653
9	Ballinabranna	Idrone West	557
10	Fennagh	Idrone East	479

== Economy ==
The Central Statistics Office estimate of Carlow's total household income in 2017 was €1.48 billion, ranking 24th out of 26 counties However, Carlow residents were the 13th highest per capita tax contributors in the State, returning a total of €331 million in taxes in 2017. This was primarily driven by the higher aggregate value of economic output from the county, along with higher wages when compared to counties in other regions such as the Midland or Border Region. Per capita disposable income in 2017 was €20,154, or 96.63% of the State average, ranking it 8th in the country. The primary economic sectors within the county are retail, services, manufacturing, pharmaceuticals and the food and drink industry.

=== Agriculture ===
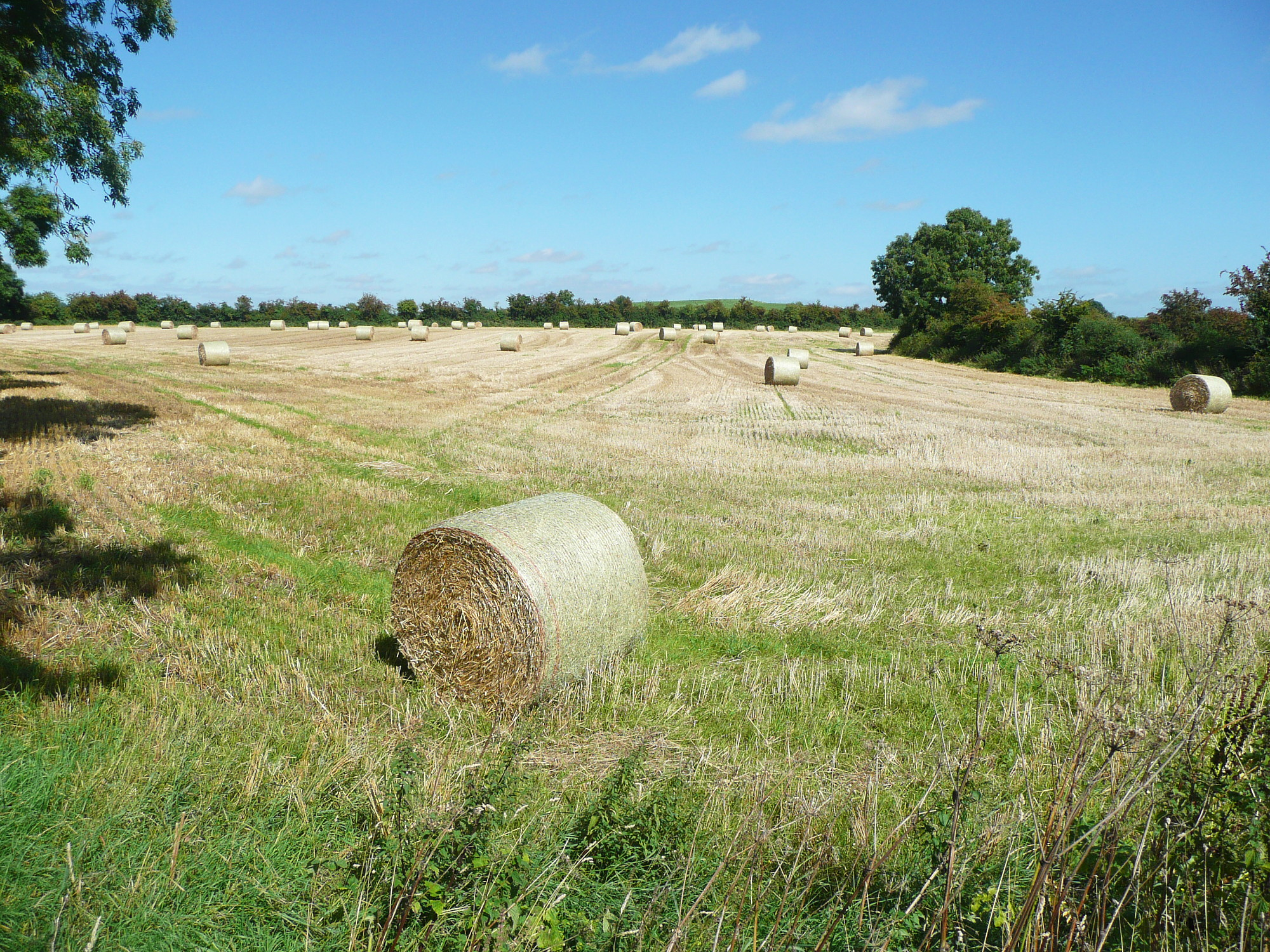
Baled hay south of Carlow town

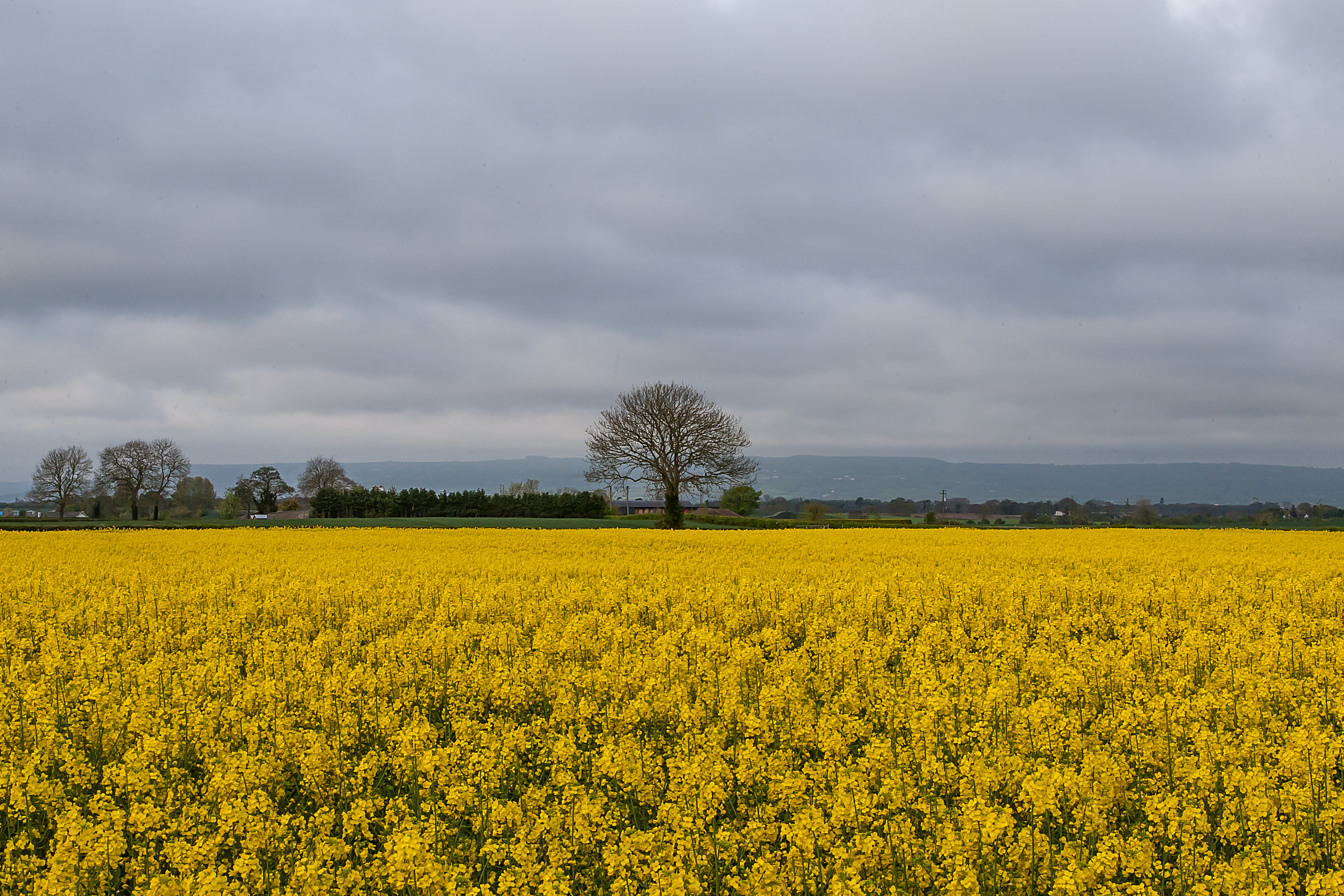
Rapeseed field near Tinryland

Despite its small size, Carlow has a large agricultural sector, and is a major producer of dairy, cereals and vegetables. Carlow has a tradition of producing high-quality agricultural products. Samuel Lewis's 1837 Topographical Dictionary of Ireland noted the "highly improved state" of the county's agricultural practices. It further states that "wheat of a superior quality is grown in every part" and that barley grown in Carlow "has long been celebrated and in great demand, and large quantities are annually shipped to England".

Dairying is the most profitable agricultural sector in the county, which historically has always been the case. Lewis's 1837 description states "Dairies are numerous and the dairy farms extensive and profitable; butter, generally of very superior quality and much esteemed in English and foreign markets, is the chief produce". As of 2018, there were 102,357 cows within the county, approximately 60% of which were beef cattle, and the remainder dairy cattle. The county also has Ireland's 13th largest sheep herd (108,851 sheep) and 13th largest pig herd (40,715 pigs).

There are 1,806 individual farms in the county, with a total farmed area of 71,142 ha (175,796 acres), accounting for 79% of land area. Of this, 16,875 ha (41,699 acres) is under tillage, the 9th highest in Ireland, and 3,450 ha (8,525 acres) of land is dedicated to horticulture and fruit, the 8th highest. The average size of a farm in the county is 39.4 ha (97 acres), significantly above the national average of 31 ha (77 acres) and according to the Irish Farmers' Association, the total value of agricultural produce from Carlow in 2016 was €188 million.

=== Industry ===
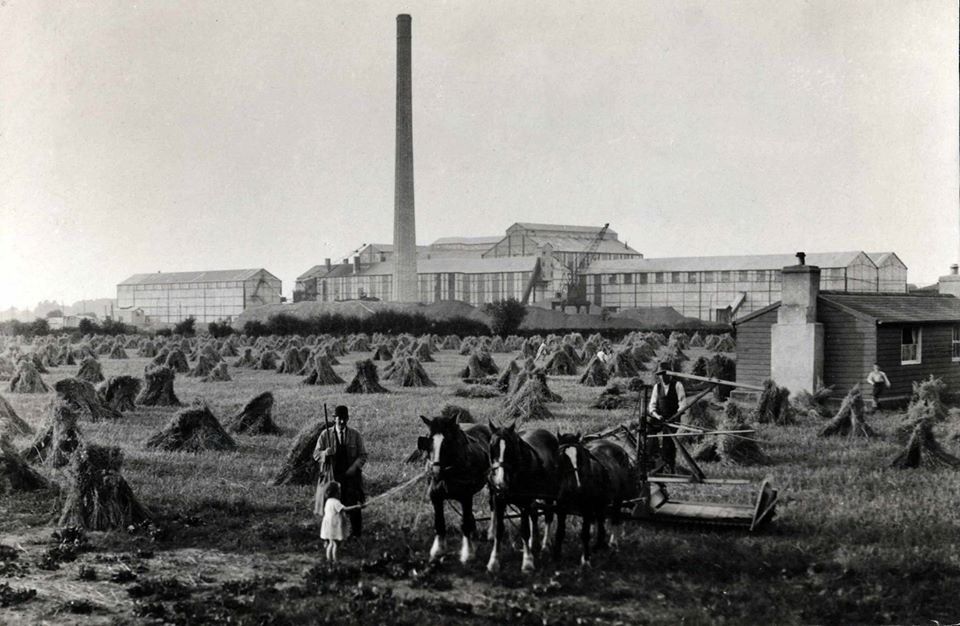
Carlow Sugar Factory, 1931

Historically, Carlow was the primary producer of sugar beet in Ireland. The Irish Sugar Manufacturing Company was created in 1926 by Carlow businessman Edward Duggan, and was a landmark moment in the industrialisation of the nascent Irish State. In 1933 the plant was nationalised by the newly elected Fianna Fáil government. The government were pursuing a policy of autarky and recognised sugar manufacturing as a core national industry, creating a State-owned sugar company – Comhlucht Siúicre Éireann – with the Carlow plant as its headquarters. The plant's forced closure in 2005 due to the introduction of EU sugar quotas was highly controversial.

Manufacturing, biosciences, retail, services and agribusiness are the county's primary economic sectors. Burnside Group are the largest single employer in the county, with over 800 employees at their sites in Tullow, Bagenalstown and Carlow. Manufacturing firm Autolaunch employ 300 people at their plant in Muine Bheag. Pharmaceutical giant Merck Sharp & Dohme has a vaccine manufacturing plant in Carlow, which employs 300 people, and Tirlán agribusiness has two feed mills in the county, at Carlow and Tinnahinch. The county is also a key supplier to the Tirlán milk pool.

In the services and IT sector, US-based insurance firm Unum employs 150 people in Carlow town, and indigenous security firm Netwatch, headquartered in Carlow town, employs 160 people, with an additional 340 employees in the UK and USA.

Multinational oil and gas exploration company Tullow Oil was founded in Tullow by Aidan Heavey in 1985. The company, which is now headquartered in London, is listed on the Irish Stock Exchange and recorded a revenue of just over €1.6 billion in 2023.

== Infrastructure ==
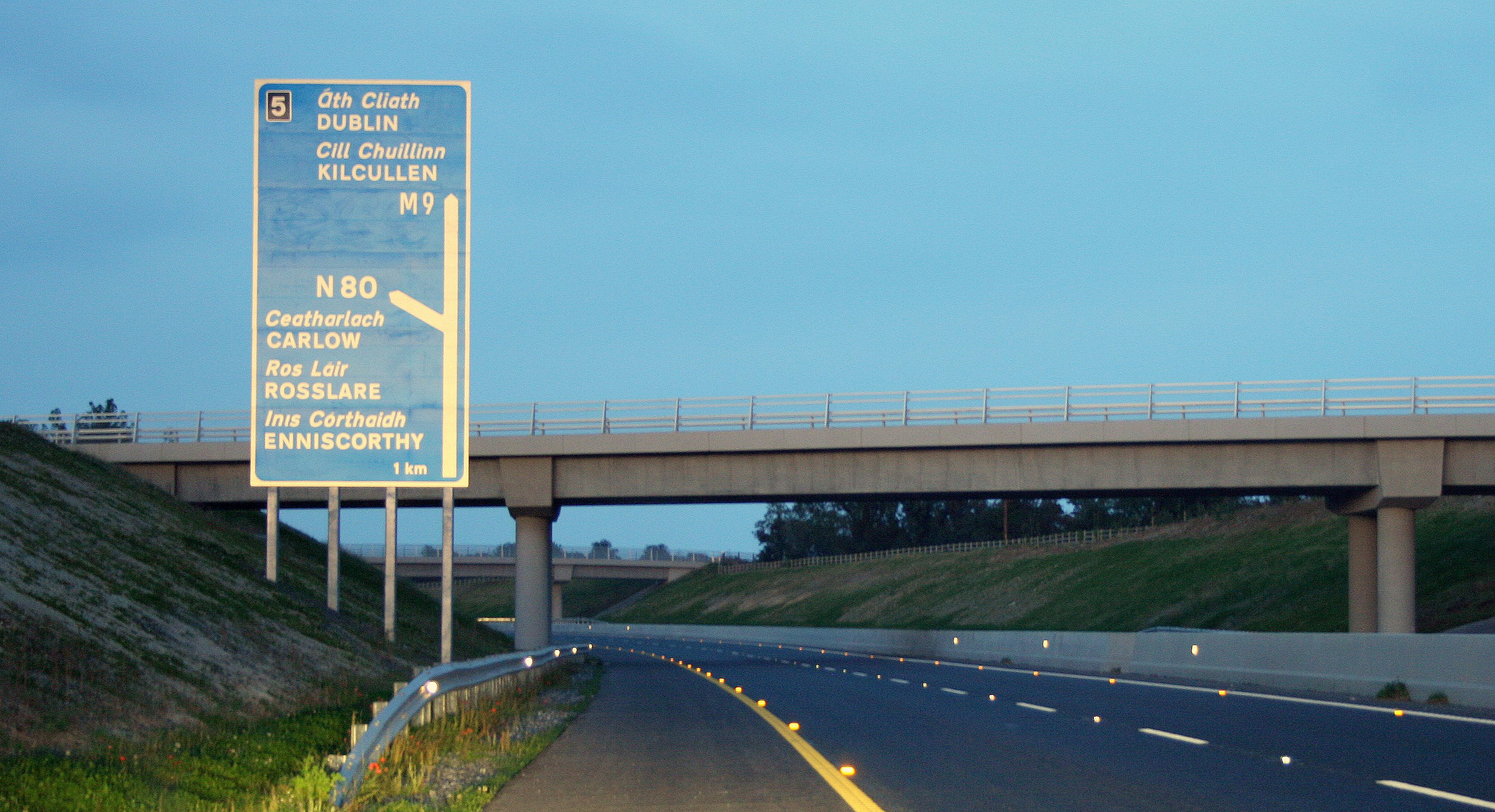
Carlow bypass/N80 junction

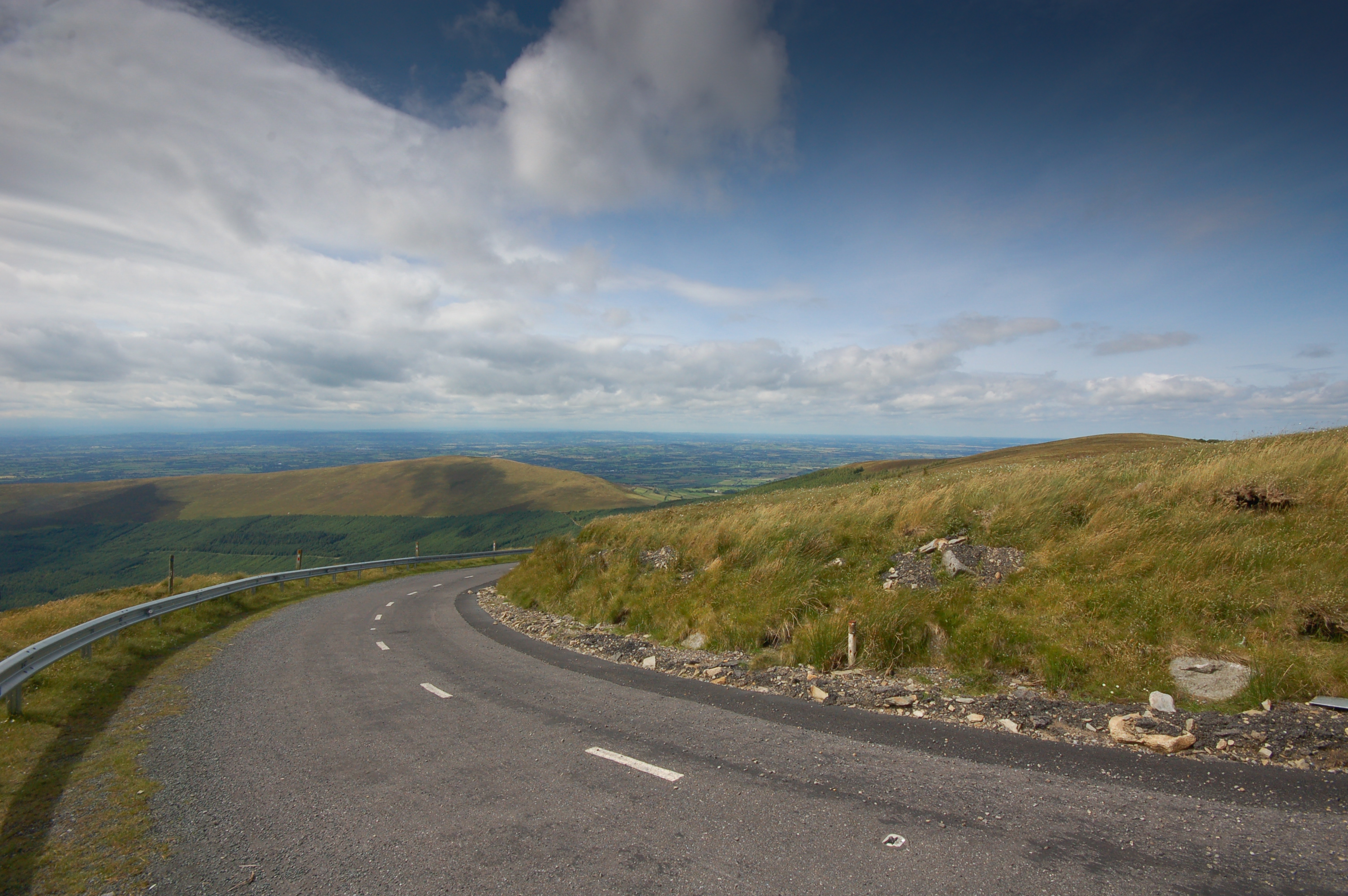
Local road in the Blackstairs Mountains

=== Transport ===
==== Road ====
County Carlow is located along the main Dublin to Waterford motorway, the M9. The M9 bypasses Carlow town to the south and has aided the growth of other commuter towns located near junctions along the M9, such as Leighlinbridge and Ballinabranna. The N80 cross-cuts the county for 33 km (21 mi), running from Carlow town to the Wexford border at Bunclody. The N81 was built to replace the old local railway line and traverses the county for 22 km (14 mi) from Ballon, through Rathvilly and Tullow, up to the County Wicklow border and on to Dublin city.

Bus Éireann, as well as private coach operators, provide bus services to villages and towns across the county.

The county is served by the following national primary roads and secondary roads:

Major roads in County Carlow
Road Name	Description	Length
	Dublin – Carlow – Kilkenny – Waterford	119.01 km (73.95 mi)
	Tullamore – Portlaoise – Carlow – Enniscorthy	114.7 km (71.3 mi)
	Tallaght – Blessington – Baltinglass – Rathvilly – Tullow	76.8 km (47.7 mi)

==== Rail ====
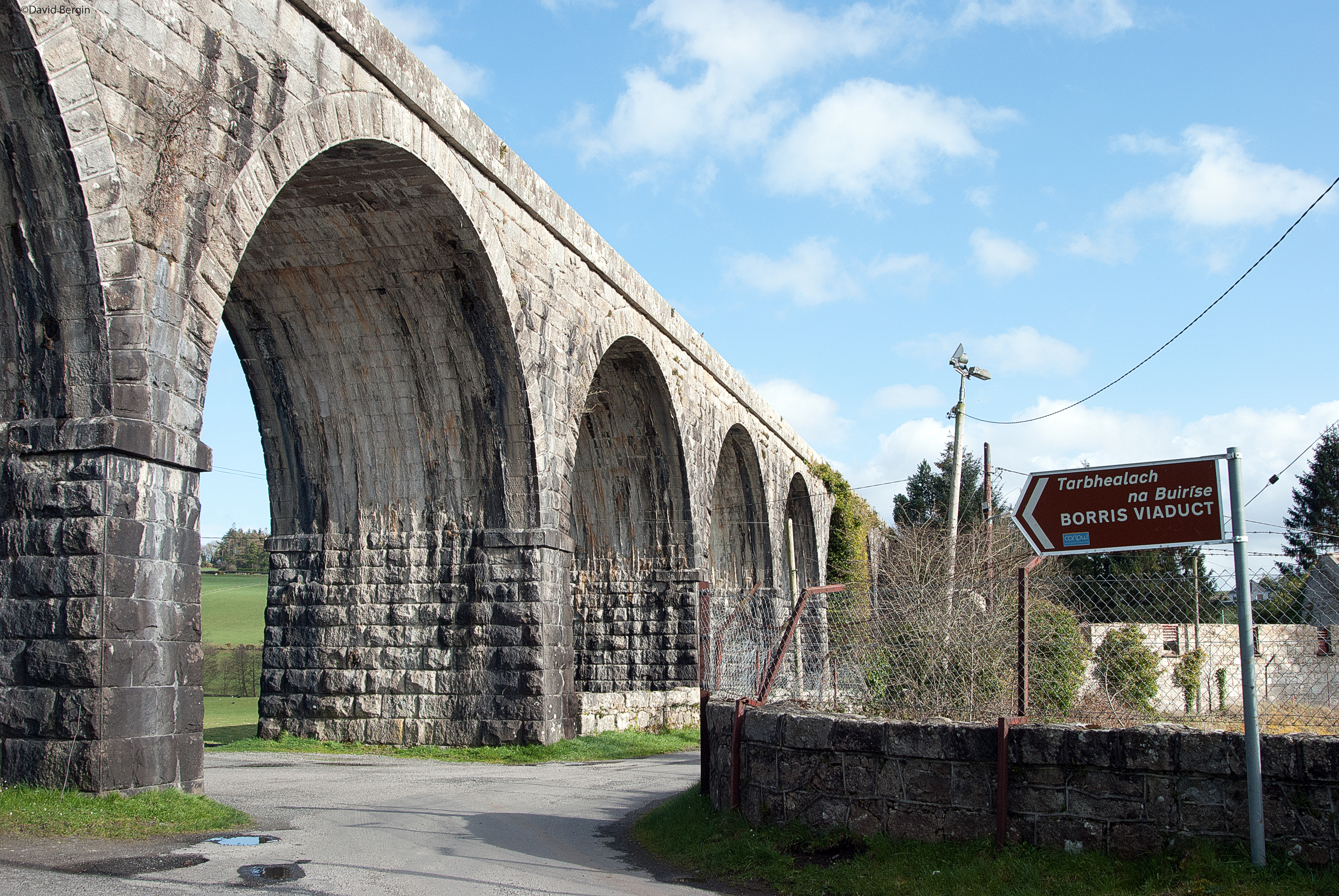
The 800 m (2,600 ft)-long Borris railway viaduct was completed in 1860

Rail coverage in Carlow is sparse, with only one active rail line currently serving the county. The Great Southern and Western Railway extended to Carlow town in August 1846. This line remains in use and serves both Carlow town and Muine Bheag along the main Dublin–Waterford railway line. The line is operated by Irish Rail and runs eight trains per day (Monday to Friday) from Carlow to Heuston Station. It is primarily used by commuters to Dublin city.

Historically, the railway network was more extensive. A rail line ran from Naas in County Kildare to Tullow and Rathvilly. This line opened in 1886 and was designed to pass through the scenic west Wicklow hills. The line closed for passenger traffic in 1947, and finally terminated all operations in 1959.

An additional line connecting Carlow to Wexford was constructed by the Bagenalstown and Wexford Railway Company. It opened its first station in December 1858 and operated two trains per day before going bankrupt in June 1864. Great Southern and Western Railway bought the line, and its successor CIÉ continued its services until 1 January 1963.

==== Air ====
For international flights, Dublin Airport is the closest international airport to Carlow. The airport is less than 2 hours by car from most towns and villages in the county. The airport can also be accessed via bus from some of the larger towns, or by linking the train from Carlow town or Bagenalstown to the Aircoach in Dublin city. Waterford Airport is the closest regional airport; however, it is currently non-operational.

The county has two airstrips which are used for light aircraft and recreational flying. The Hacketstown Airfield (ICAO Code: EIHN) is located on the Tinaheally Road approximately 1 km (0.62 mi) south of Hacketstown and has one 375m runway. The Killamaster Airstrip is located 12 km (7.5 mi) northwest of Carlow town.

== Sport ==
=== GAA ===
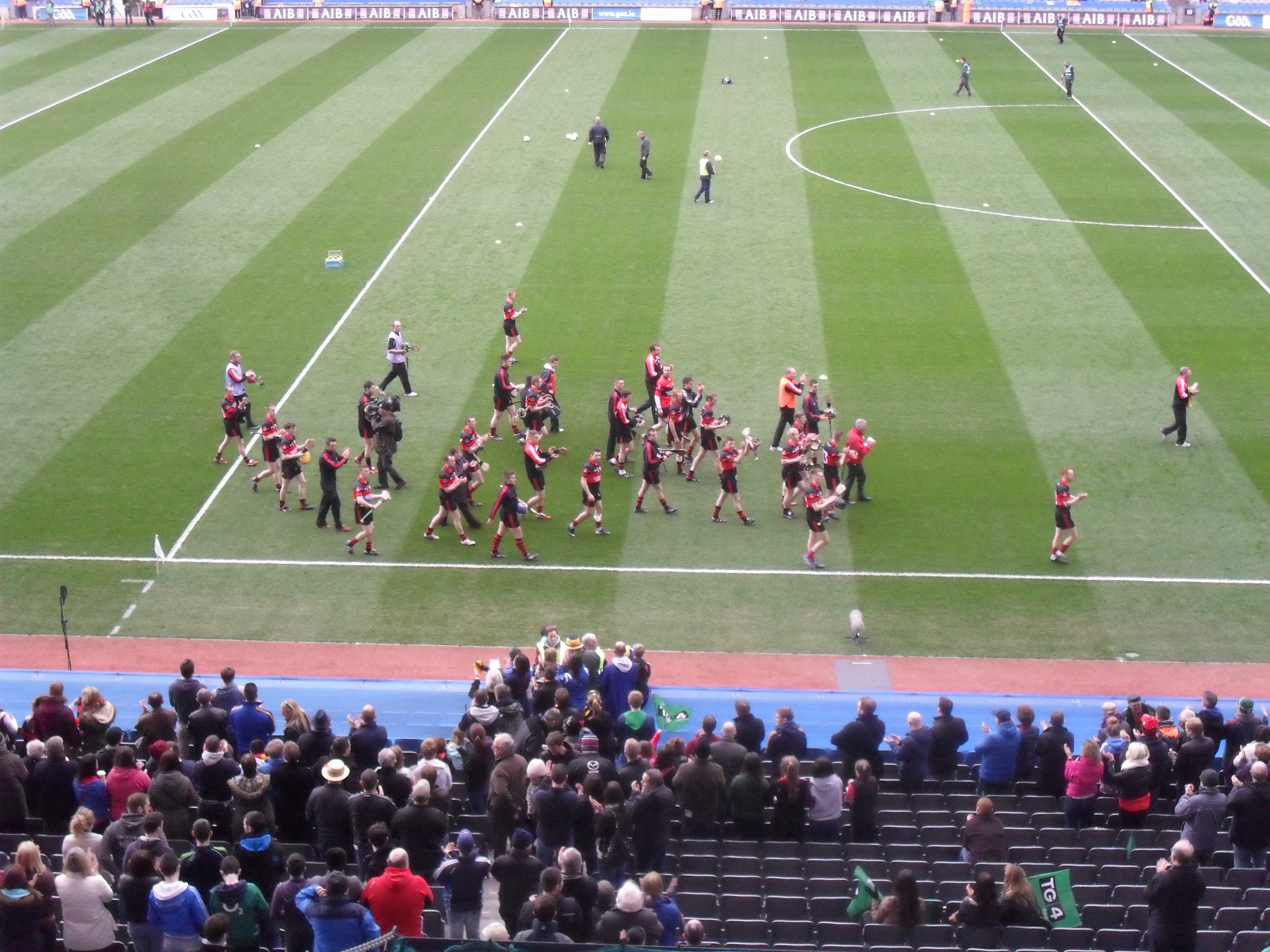
Mount Leinster Rangers at the 2014 All-Ireland Club Final

In GAA, Carlow is recognised as a dual county, meaning that Gaelic football and Hurling are equally popular. The county competes in Division 1B of the National Hurling League and Division 3 of the National Football League. Historically, the county has seen little success at top level in either sport, its biggest achievement being a Leinster football provincial win in 1944. That year, Carlow progressed to the All-Ireland semi-final, in which they were beaten by Kerry.

At club level, the county has seen much more success. Football clubs compete annually in the Carlow Senior Football Championship. The competition was first played for two years in 1889 and 1890, after which financial constraints suspended activities until 1897. Ballon O'Gorman Mahons won the first, and what would be their only, championship title in 1889, beating the Tullow Stars and Stripes 1–01 to 0–00. The most successful club in the county is Éire Óg, with 28 Senior Football Championship titles. At provincial level, clubs from Carlow have won 6 Leinster Senior Club Football Championship titles, the 3rd most of any county. Of these, Éire Óg have won 5 and O'Hanrahans GFC have won 1, the most recent of which was in 2000. No team from Carlow has ever won the All-Ireland Senior Club Football Championship, although Éire Óg have been runners up on two occasions in 1993 and 1996.

The county's hurling tradition is more recent, dating back to the first Carlow Senior Hurling Championship in 1927. The first championship was won by Carlow town in a 2–03 to 1–04 victory over Bagnelstown. The most successful hurling club in the county is St. Mullin's, with 27 titles. In 2013 Mount Leinster Rangers became the first Carlow club to win a Leinster Senior Club Hurling title, and the club made in to the finals of the All-Ireland the following year, but were beaten by Portumna.

=== Other sports ===
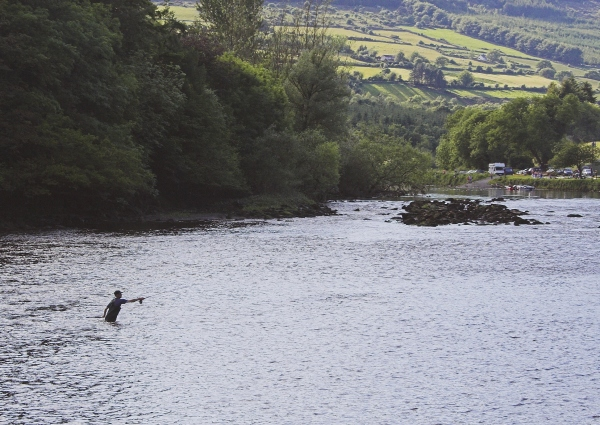
Fishing along the River Barrow

In addition to Gaelic games, clubs for other organised sports were set up across the county in the latter half of the 19th century. Several Carlow landlords were involved in the formation of the Phoenix Cricket Club (Ireland's oldest cricket club) in 1830. Local aristocrat Horace Rochfort founded the Carlow Cricket Club the following year. The Bagnelstown Cricket Club was set up in 1843, making the derby between these two clubs the longest provincial cricket rivalry in Ireland. Towards the end of his life, Rochfort also established the Carlow Rugby Football Club (Ireland's second oldest rugby club) in 1873, as well as the Carlow (and later Ireland) Polo club.

In association football, Carlow was represented in the League of Ireland by F.C. Carlow, which competed in the A Championship until the club's disbandment in 2016. While the county currently lacks a prominent football club, local amateur clubs compete in the Carlow and District Football League. There are also over a dozen golf courses within the county, among them the Carlow Golf Club, Killerig castle, Borris Golf Club and the Mount Wolseley Spa and Golf Resort.

Club	Sport	League
County Carlow Football Club	Rugby union	Leinster League
IT Carlow Basketball	Basketball	NBCC League
Carlow Cricket Club	Cricket	Leinster Cricket Union
Carlow Hockey Club	Field hockey	Leinster Hockey Association
St Laurence O'Toole AC	Athletics	National Championships
Carlow Lawn Tennis Club	Tennis, Badminton, Squash	–

== Culture and Heritage ==
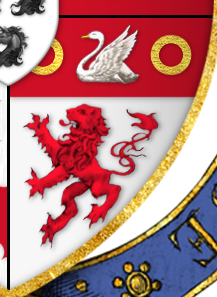
Lions rampant of the Butler dynasty

Lions passant of Normandy

The patrimony of the Butlers of Ormond encompassed parts of County Carlow as well as most of the modern counties of Tipperary and Kilkenny, and all three counties share a similarly styled coat of arms which reflect the Butler dynasty. Their first recorded use was in 1665, collectively making them the oldest county coats of arms in Ireland. Most other counties adopted a coat of arms after independence, whereas Carlow, Kilkenny and Tipperary continue to use their historic Butler-era coat of arms.

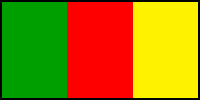
The Carlow Gaelic games flag

The county's coat of arms comprises an Ermine field – a white background with a pattern of black shapes representing the winter coat of the stoat. The linings of medieval coronation cloaks and some other garments, usually reserved for use by high-ranking peers such as the Butlers, were made by sewing many ermine furs together to produce a luxurious white fur with patterns of hanging black-tipped tails.

There are two further symbols per Fess. On the left side, a red lions rampant, the heraldic symbol of the branch of the Butler dynasty which resided within Carlow. On the right side, two lions passant from the coat of arms of Normandy, which symbolise that the Butlers derived their authority from the Angevin monarch. This latter symbol makes Carlow's coat of arms unique in the Republic of Ireland, where British monarchical emblems are not typically present on local or national government seals.

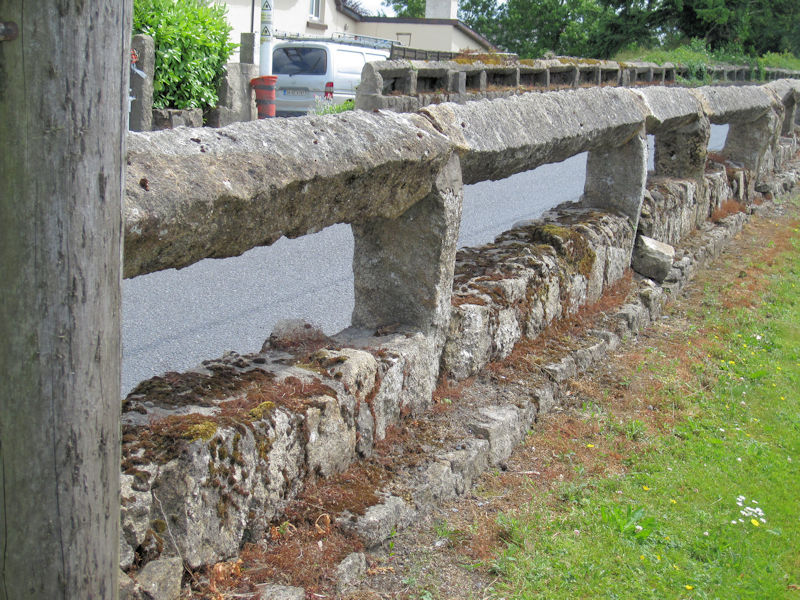
A "Carlow Fence"

In Gaelic games, the county flag was first adopted in 1910. The flag is a green, red and yellow tricolour adapted from the coat of arms of Carlow town. The town's coat of arms displays a green and yellow flag with the Butler red lion in the centre, flying over Carlow Castle. The county flag has several variant forms, often displaying either the county coat of arms or the Carlow GAA logo in the middle.

=== County Songs ===
The Irish folk song "Follow Me Up to Carlow" is the county anthem, and is used for a variety of tourism and sporting purposes. However, the song itself is not actually about Carlow. It celebrates the defeat of the English army by Fiach Mac Aodh Ó Broin at the Battle of Glenmalure in 1580. A "Song for Carlow" competition was held in 2005 to select a new unofficial anthem based on the county. Out of 112 entries, a song entitled "The Red, Yellow and Green" by country singer Derek Ryan was chosen as the winner by a live audience and panel of judges. Comedian Richie Kavanagh has also written numerous songs which make reference to the county and its landmarks, including "It's Called the County Carlow" and "The Carlow Fence" – a comedic song of admiration for the county's unique Quaker-style decorative granite fences.

=== Art and Festivals ===
The VISUAL Centre is located on the Old Dublin Road in Carlow town and hosts a contemporary art museum as well as the George Bernard Shaw Theatre. Shaw had familial ties to the town and inherited properties through his mother's family. He donated his properties to the Carlow Urban Council in 1944 for the "common welfare", specifically stipulating that the properties could not be privately sold or used to subsidise the local rates.

There are a number of cultural activities and events held within the county each year. The Carlow Arts Festival has been held annually since 1979 and is aimed at promoting culture and the arts within the county. The Taste of Carlow Festival is centred around local cuisine and showcases locally produced bread, cheese, pastries and Craft Beers. The Festival of Writing and Ideas is held each year on the grounds of Borris House and features live discussions with novelists, poets and journalists.

== People ==
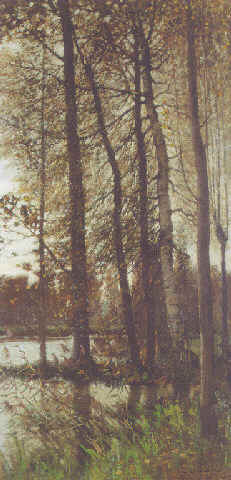
Autumnal greys (1880) by Frank O'Meara

- Turtle Bunbury – Historian and author
- Pierce Butler – soldier, planter, and statesman, recognized as one of United States' Founding Fathers
- Finnian of Clonard, 5th century saint
- William Dargan – engineer, often seen as the father of Irish railways
- Alan Harverson – organist and teacher
- Samuel Haughton – polymath, in 1866 published a formula for calculating the drop needed to cause instantaneous death at hangings
- Richie Kavanagh – comic songwriter
- Myles Keogh – American Civil War military officer and later Captain of Company I, U.S. 7th Cavalry Regiment
- Richard Montfort – architect and engineer, first Chief Engineer of the Louisville and Nashville Railroad.
- David Mullins – Irish jockey, notable for riding Rule The World to win the 2016 Grand National
- Peter Murphy – radio and television broadcaster, presented RTÉ's Cross Country Quiz, was born in Carlow
- Seán O'Brien – Leinster, London Irish, Ireland and British & Irish Lions international rugby player
- Frank O'Meara – Carlow-born artist known for his impressionist, plein air landscape painting
- Thomas P. O'Neill, historian
- Mary O'Toole – first woman municipal judge in the United States
- Saoirse Ronan – Oscar nominated and Golden Globe awarded actress.
- Derek Ryan – Country music singer & former member of Pop band D-side
- Molly Scott - athlete and barrister
- William Desmond Taylor – silent film director and actor
- Kathryn Thomas – RTÉ presenter
- John Tyndall – the 19th century scientist who was the first to explain why the sky is blue

== See also ==
- List of abbeys and priories in Ireland (County Carlow)
- Lord Lieutenant of Carlow
- High Sheriff of Carlow

== Bibliography ==
- Campbell, Timothy R. and Royle, Stephen A.: The country house and its demesne in County Carlow.
- Conry, Michael: The Personality of County Carlow: landscape and people. Carlow History and Society
- Doran, Linda: Medieval settlement hierarchy in Carlow and the 'Carlow Corridor' 1200–1550. Carlow History and Society
- Fletcher, George (1922). Ireland. Cambridge, UK: Cambridge University Press. ISBN 978-1316620021.
- National Trails Office (2010). "Setting New Directions. A review of National Waymarked Ways in Ireland" (PDF). Dublin: Irish Sports Council. Archived from the original (PDF) on 31 May 2011.
- Nolan, William: County Carlow 1641–1660: Geography, land ownership and society. Carlow History and Society
- O’Byrne, Emmett: 'A divided loyalty': The MacMurroughs, the Irish of Leinster and the Crown of England 1340–1420. Carlow History and Society
- O'Toole, Jimmy: The landed gentry in decline – A County Carlow perspective.
- Purcell, Michael Carlow in Old Pictures & Carlow in Old Pictures Vol 2
