= James Moriarty (bishop) =

Irish Catholic bishop (1936–2022)

The Most Reverend James Moriarty D.D.
- Bishop of Kildare and Leighlin
- Church: Roman Catholic
- Diocese: Kildare and Leighlin
- Installed: 31 August 2002
- Term ended: 22 April 2010
- Predecessor: Laurence Ryan
- Successor: Denis Nulty
- Previous posts: Auxiliary Bishop of the Archdiocese of Dublin; Titular Bishop of Bononia

Orders
- Ordination: 21 May 1961
- Consecration: 22 September 1991 by Desmond Connell

Personal details
- Born: 13 August 1936 Dublin, Ireland
- Died: 26 March 2022 (aged 85) Milltown, Dublin, Ireland
- Buried: Cathedral of the Assumption, Carlow
- Education: Clonliffe College; University College Dublin; Maynooth College
- Motto: Sentire pro omnibus (To think and feel for all)

James Moriarty (13 August 1936 – 27 March 2022) was an Irish Roman Catholic prelate who served as Bishop of Kildare and Leighlin between 2002 and 2010.

== Early life ==
Moriarty was born in Dublin on 13 August 1936, one of five children to Michael and Catherine Moriarty. He attended secondary school at the Catholic University School and studied for the priesthood at Holy Cross College, from where he was ordained to the priesthood on 21 May 1961.

Moriarty also attended University College Dublin and St Patrick's College, Maynooth, from where he obtained a Doctorate in Divinity.

== Presbyteral ministry ==
Following his ordination, Moriarty's first appointment was as a teacher at the vocational school in Killester. He later served as chaplain to the Poor Servants of the Mother of God community on Portland Row, and as a teacher at the vocational school on Mount Street in the city centre. Moriarty was appointed chaplain in University College Dublin from 1968 to 1979, before subsequently serving as a curate in Dún Laoghaire between 1979 and 1983, and in Bawnogue between 1983 and 1985.

Moriarty was appointed the first parish priest of Deansrath – a then-developing area near Clondalkin that had been constituted from Bawnogue – from 1983 to 1989, and subsequently parish priest of Donaghmede from 1989 to 1991.

Moriarty was elected chairman of the diocesan council of priests in the late 1980s.

== Episcopal ministry ==
=== Auxiliary Bishop of Dublin ===
Moriarty was appointed auxiliary bishop of Dublin and titular bishop of Bononia in Bulgaria by Pope John Paul II on 26 June 1991. He was consecrated on 22 September by the Archbishop of Dublin, Desmond Connell, in St Andrew's Church, Westland Row, Dublin. He was given responsibility for the deaneries of Fingal South East, Fingal South West and Howth.

=== Bishop of Kildare and Leighlin ===
Moriarty was appointed Bishop-elect of Kildare and Leighlin by Pope John Paul II on 4 June 2002, and was installed on 31 August in the Cathedral of the Assumption, Carlow.

During his episcopate, in response to a consultation process on pastoral priorities for the diocese, he introduced the "Reach Out" initiative, in which parishioners in all churches in the diocese were invited during Advent to bring home a candle and an envelope containing an explanatory leaflet and a table prayer card. He also chaired the Commission for Worship, Pastoral Renewal and Faith Development of the Irish Catholic Bishops' Conference.

==== Resignation ====
Following the publication of the Murphy Report on 29 November 2009 and the resignation on 17 December of former auxiliary bishop of Dublin and then-Bishop of Limerick, Donal Murray, amid criticism at his handling of allegations against several priests, it was widely expected that Moriarty would resign as Bishop of Kildare and Leighlin. The report stated that Moriarty had received a complaint in 1993 about a priest's contact with young children – named in the report as Fr Edmondus – and that no attempt has been made by the archdiocesan governance to check archives or other files relating to Fr Edmondus when this complaint was received. The report added that Moriarty had told the commission that while he did not have access to the archives, he could have asked then-Archbishop Desmond Connell to conduct a search.

Moriarty released a statement on 23 December 2009, stating that while the report did not criticise him directly, he fully accepted the overall conclusion of the Commission of Investigation. On the basis that in his capacity as an auxiliary bishop in the Archdiocese of Dublin, he had failed to challenge the culture of how abuse allegations were handled, he announced that he had offered his resignation to Pope Benedict XVI, which was formally accepted on 22 April 2010.

== Retirement and death ==
Following his resignation as Bishop of Kildare and Leighlin, Moriarty served as an assistant priest in Saint Anthony's parish, Clontarf.

He died on 26 March 2022 in Cherryfield Lodge Nursing Home, Milltown, Dublin.

His funeral Mass took place on 30 March in the Cathedral of the Assumption, Carlow, with burial afterwards in the cathedral grounds.

Catholic Church titles
Preceded by Laurence Ryan	Bishop of Kildare and Leighlin; 2002–2010	Succeeded by Denis Nulty
Preceded by Pablo Antonio Vega Mantilla	Titular Bishop of Bononia; 1991–2002	Succeeded by Milan Šašik
