= James Keeffe =

Irish bishop

- Bishop of Kildare and Leighlin
- Province: Dublin
- Diocese: Kildare and Leighlin
- See: Kildare
- Appointed: 1752
- Term ended: 1788
- Predecessor: Bishop James Gallagher
- Successor: Bishop Daniel Delany

Orders
- Ordination: by Bishop James Bernard Dunne

Personal details
- Buried: The Barrow Track Cemetery (The Graves), Carlow, Co.Carlow
- Denomination: Roman Catholic

James Keeffe (sometimes misspelled as Keefe) was an Irish Roman Catholic cleric who was the founder of St. Patrick's, Carlow College. He was Bishop of Kildare and Leighlin for over 35 years (1752–1787). He lived most of his time at Tullow, County Carlow.

He was preceded by Bishop James Gallagher in 1737 and succeeded by Bishop Daniel Delany in 1787, who was his co-adjutor Bishop and also helped in the foundation of Carlow College.
