= Thomas Keogh =

Irish Catholic bishop

- Bishop of Kildare and Leighlin
- Church: Catholic Church
- Diocese: Diocese of Kildare and Leighlin
- In office: 8 August 1936 – 25 September 1967
- Predecessor: Matthew Cullen
- Successor: Patrick Lennon
- Other post: Titular Bishop of Turris Tamalleni (1967-1969)

Orders
- Ordination: 13 June 1909
- Consecration: 18 October 1936 by Paschal Robinson

Personal details
- Born: 16 June 1884 Graiguenamanagh, County Kilkenny, United Kingdom of Great Britain and Ireland
- Died: 22 May 1969 (aged 84)

Thomas Keogh was a Roman Catholic priest who became Bishop of Kildare and Leighlin. He was born in Gurteen, Skeoghvosteen, Graiguenamanagh, County Kilkenny in 1884. In 1898, he enrolled in St. Josephs's Academy in Bagenalstown, operated by the De La Salle Brothers. He studied for the priesthood in St. Patrick's College, Maynooth, and was ordained in 1909.

Bishop Keogh served on the staff of St. Patrick's, Carlow College (1911-1932) and as Vice-President (1921-1932), before being appointed parish priest of Portarlington, County Laois.

He was appointed Bishop of Kildare and Leighlin succeeding Dr. Matthew Cullen on 8 August, and consecrated 18 October 1936. He retired 25 September 1967, and died on 22 May 1969.

Catholic Church titles
Preceded by Matthew Cullen	Bishop of Kildare and Leighlin; 1936–1967	Succeeded by Patrick Lennon
