= Andrew Fitzgerald =

Dominican friar and professor

Father Andrew Fitzgerald O.P
- Born: 30 November 1763; Kilkenny, Ireland
- Died: 14 December 1843 (aged 80)
- Education: Kilkenny College; Old University of Leuven; Irish College at Lisbon
- Scientific career
- Fields: classics; philosophy; theology; sacred scripture
- Workplaces: St. Canice's Academy, Kilkenny; St. Patrick's College, Carlow
- Notable students: James Fintan Lalor

Father Andrew Fitzgerald O.P (30 November 1763 – 14 December 1843) was a Dominican friar and professor of theology from Kilkenny, Ireland. He attended Kilkenny College, and University of Louvain. He was a professor at St. Patrick's College, Carlow. Fitzgerald taught classics, philosophy, theology and sacred scripture. He was chair of divinity, and president. at St. Patrick's. In 1811 he set up a school for girls in Carlow town.

Fitzgerald was imprisoned during the Tithe War in 1832 for his refusal to pay tithes. In 1835, the French political philosopher Alexis de Tocqueville said "Mr. Fitzgerald is a lovable old man; democratic and Catholic fervour is shown more openly with him than with the Bishop."

== Education ==
A native of Kilkenny, he was born in 1763 to James FitzGerald and Mary Fitzgerald (née Knarsborough) on High Street, he went to school in the Church of Ireland run Kilkenny College and at the age of 16 went to study in the University of Louvain, becoming a Dominican friar. He also studied in Lisbon, where he was awarded degree of master of arts, on 4 September 1788.

== Career ==
He returned to Ireland in 1792, and with Rev. Patrick McGrath was in charge of St. Canice's Academy, Kilkenny. He spent three years rebuilding the Dominican Abbey, Kilkenny

He joined the teaching staff at Carlow College on 1 March 1800. At Carlow he taught classics, philosophy, theology and sacred scripture. In 1810 Fitzgerlad, then professor of theology at Carlow College, invited the Presentation Sisters to set up a school for girls in Carlow, which they did in 1811.

He succeeded Dr. Henry Staunton in 1814 to become president of the college, some years earlier he had left his teaching position being replaced by James Warren Doyle, in dispute with the college only to return soon afterwards.

In 1814 Rev. Andrew FitzGerald was appointed professor of sacred scripture in Maynooth College he declined to accept the office staying at Carlow.

== Tithe War ==
He was imprisoned during the Tithe War in 1832 for his refusal to pay tithes when he was president of the college. Amongst his students in Carlow was the Irish patriot James Fintan Lalor.

Fr. Fitzgerald proposed Nicholas Aylward Vigors MP in the election 1832, and again in 1835, in Carlow borough, seconded by a fellow anti-tithes campaigner the Quaker Thomas Haughton.

The French political philosopher Alexis de Tocqueville who toured Ireland in 1835, commented that Monseigneur Fitzgerald was a man of openly Catholic and democratic passions.
