= Patrick E. Moriarty =

Irish priest and missionary (1805–1875)

Dr Patrick Eugene Moriarty DD OSA was an Irish born priest, missionary, orator and educator.

Born in Dublin, on 4 July 1805. He was the fourth son among the eight children of Eugene Moriarty, a lawyer in Dublin. He received his higher education at St. Patrick's, Carlow College, studying under the Irish Nationalist and future Bishop James Warren Doyle, OSA.

Moriarty joined the Augustinian Order at Callan, Co. Kilkenny, Ireland, on 14 May 1822. He continued his studies at the monastery of St. Augustine in Rome where e was ordained in 1828. Following some time in Dublin, and a brief period in Portugal as a military chaplain, and in 1835 he went to India, where he was vicar-general in the Madras mission. Pope Gregory XVI named him Master of Sacred Theology on the basis of his missionary work in India, here he was the first Catholic Chaplain to be recognised by the British government since the reformation.

In 1839, he moved to Pennsylvania in America. He was instrumental along with Fr. Kyle in the founding of Villanova University, Pennsylvania, purchasing the land on which the college was built, and he served as the president of the college from 1851 until 1855.

He died aged 70 on 10 July 1875 at Villanova and is buried at St Augustine's in Philadelphia. Bishop Quinlan of Mobile, Alabama preached the eulogy at his funeral. Moriarty Hall in Villanova University is named in his honour.
