= Dr Cullen Park =

Gaelic sports stadium, County Carlow, Ireland

Netwatch Cullen Park
- Páirc an Dochtúra Uí Chuilinn
- Interactive map of Netwatch Cullen Park
- Location: Dr Cullen Road, Carlow, County Carlow, R93 K339, Ireland
- Coordinates: 52°50′49″N 6°54′59″W
- Public transit: Carlow railway station
- Owner: Carlow GAA
- Capacity: 11,000
- Field size: 145 × 87 m
- Surface: Grass

Construction
- Opened: 9 August 1936
- Renovated: 2003
- Construction cost: IR£3,590 15 s.

Dr Cullen Park, known for sponsorship reasons as Netwatch Cullen Park, is a GAA stadium in Carlow, County Carlow, Ireland. It is the home of the Carlow Gaelic football and hurling teams. It has a capacity of 11,000.

== History ==
The establishment of the ground was first proposed in 1935. Dr Cullen Park was officially opened on 9 August 1936 by Patrick McNamee of the GAA. A total expenditure of £3,590 and 15 shillings was recorded at the first audit, which included the purchase of the land.

Dr Cullen Park was officially opened on Sunday 9 August 1936. It was named in honour of Dr Matthew Cullen (Catholic Bishop of Kildare and Leighlin 1927–36) who had died on 2 January 1936. The late Bishop was honoured as "a great churchman, a true-hearted gael and a patriotic Irishman". Thomas Ryan President of County Carlow GAA presided at the ceremony. Padraig McNamee, President of the Ulster Council of the GAA represented the President of the Association. A number of local dignitaries also attended including James Reddy, who was the County Secretary during the early 1898–1890 period.

By the 1960s, Dr Cullen Park still lacked a stand. However, it featured a well-maintained playing pitch, newly fenced to prevent encroachment by spectators. The park was also equipped with good dressing rooms, hot and cold water and showers, a referee’s dressing room, and board rooms.

In the summer of 1967, major improvements were carried out at Dr Cullen Park. A tarmac apron was added around the main entrance, and wrought iron entrance gates, inscribed "Páirc an Cullainaigh," were built by Joseph Bennett Steel Contractors of Stradbally, County Laois. This firm also constructed the entrance gates to Fr. Maher Park in Graiguecullen, on the Laois side of Carlow town. The first match played at Dr Cullen Park was the Leinster Junior Football Final between Kildare and Wicklow, held on 2 August 1936, a week before the official opening.

The ground hosted the first Friday night game in the history of the All-Ireland Senior Football Championship – a first round qualifier between Carlow and Laois.

== See also ==
- List of Gaelic Athletic Association stadiums
- List of stadiums in Ireland by capacity
