= Edward Burke (priest) =

Irish Roman Catholic priest (1847–1915)

Edward William Burke (3 July 1847 – 10 November 1915) was a priest, president of Carlow College, and founder of St. Joseph's Academy, was born in Clane, County Kildare, Ireland. He attended Carlow College and shortly after, he went Maynooth College, where he became an ordained priest. After one year in Dunboyne Institute, he subsequently became a professor, vice-president and president of Carlow College, and parish priest of Bagenalstown, County Carlow. He also established St. Joseph's Academy of Bagenalstown.

Burke was born in Hodgestown, Clane, Co. Kildare, on 3 July 1847. He was educated at Carlow College, and at Maynooth before being ordained for the priesthood in Maynooth in 1869.

Following a year in the Dunboyne Institute in Maynooth, Burke became a professor in Carlow College], served as vice-president of the college from 1874 and as College president from 1880 until 1892. In 1890 he was appointed parish priest of Bagenalstown, Co. Carlow.

During his presidency of Carlow College the College Chapel was built, also the transfer of the Lay College to Knockbeg occurred during his tenure in Carlow College.

While in Bagenalstown, Burke established St. Joseph’s Academy and invited the De La Salle Brothers to staff both it and St. Brigid’s National School.

He died on 10 November 1915.

== See also ==
- Catholic Church in Ireland
