= Edward Nolan (bishop) =

- Bishop of Kildare and Leighlin
- Church: Roman Catholic
- Diocese: Kildare and Leighlin
- Elected: 1834
- Installed: 1834
- Term ended: 1837
- Predecessor: James Doyle (JKL)
- Successor: Francis Haly
- Other posts: Professor at Carlow College, Vice-President of Carlow College

Orders
- Ordination: 1819
- Rank: Bishop

Personal details
- Born: Edward Nolan Tullow, County Carlow, Ireland
- Died: Kildare and Leighlin
- Denomination: Roman Catholic
- Residence: Kildare and Leighlin
- Occupation: Priest, Bishop, Educator
- Profession: Clergy, Education
- Education: Carlow College, Maynooth College

Bishop Edward Nolan (1793-1837) was the Roman Catholic bishop in Kildare and Leighlin from 1834 until his death in 1837.

Edward Nolan was born in Tullow, County Carlow, in 1793. He was educated at Carlow College from 1804 until 1811 when he went to Maynooth College.

Following ordination in 1819 he taught at Carlow College serving in various roles such as Professor of Logic, Theology and Vice-President. In 1834, he succeeded Bishop James Doyle (JKL) following Doyle's death.

He died on 14 October 1837, and was succeeded in the bishopric by Francis Haly.

== See also ==
- Catholic Church in Ireland
