= James Ignatius Taylor =

- Born: July 1805; Dublin, Ireland
- Died: February 5, 1875 (aged 69); Maryborough, Ireland
- Education: St Patrick's, Carlow College; University of London
- Occupations: Priest; Educator

Ecclesiastical career
- Religion: Roman Catholic
- Offices held: President of Carlow College (1843–1850)

James Ignatius Taylor,(1805 - 1875), was an Irish priest, educator and ecclesiastic.

== Education ==
James Ignatius Taylor was born at Gardiner's Place, Dublin in July 1805 to Joseph and Anne Taylor. In 1822 he went to study at St Patrick's, Carlow College; his older brother, Rev. John B. Taylor who had studied in Paris, was a professor in the college. James was ordained on 28 May 1831 to the priesthood and was appointed bursar of the college.

== Life ==
In 1834 he was appointed vice-president of the college. He also served as Professor of Sacred Scripture. In 1841 Taylor was awarded a BA degree by the University of London, to which Carlow was affiliated. In 1843 he became president of St. Patrick's, holding the position until 1850. While president of the college, he made a visit to Rome and was awarded the degree of Doctor in Theology(DD). On 2 June 1847, he bought a farm and 127 acres of land at Knockbeg and founded St. Mary's (Knockbeg College) as a preparatory school for Carlow College.

Leaving Carlow College, he moved to Dublin and joined the Vincentians; he became secretary to the Archbishop of Dublin, and in January 1853 became secretary of the Catholic University of Ireland.

He also served as Parish Priest of Rathvilly, County Carlow, and later of Maryborough, Portlaoise, County Laois, for twenty years.

He died in the parochial house in Maryborough on 5 February 1875.
