= John Dunne (priest) =

Irish priest and educator

John Dunne was an Irish priest and educator, who served as President of Carlow College from 1856 to 1864. He was born in July 1816 in Ballinakill, Queens County(Laois) his great uncle also called John Dunne was Bishop of Ossory. His father John Dunne gave evidence along with James Doyle to a House of Commons Committee in London. Educated at Ballyroan, in 1834 he entered St. Patrick's, Carlow College, from which in 1837 he proceeded to Maynooth College completing his ecclesiastic course, he proceeding to study in the Dunboyne Establishment. Dunne returned to Carlow College as a Professor of Moral and Mental Philosophy, in 1850 he was appointed vice-president, and 1856 he succeeded Dr. Walshe as President of the college.

Dunne was appointed parish priest in Kildare, in 1864 and he died there on 25 July 1867. He is buried in St. Brigid's Church, Kildare.
