= Bishop of Kildare and Leighlin =

Catholic bishopric in Ireland

- Bishopric

catholic
- Coat of arms
- Incumbent; Denis Nulty since 7 May 2013
- Style: Your grace

Location
- Country: Ireland

Information
- First holder: John Dempsey
- Established: 1694
- Cathedral: Cathedral of the Assumption of Blessed Virgin Mary, Carlow

Website
- kandle.ie

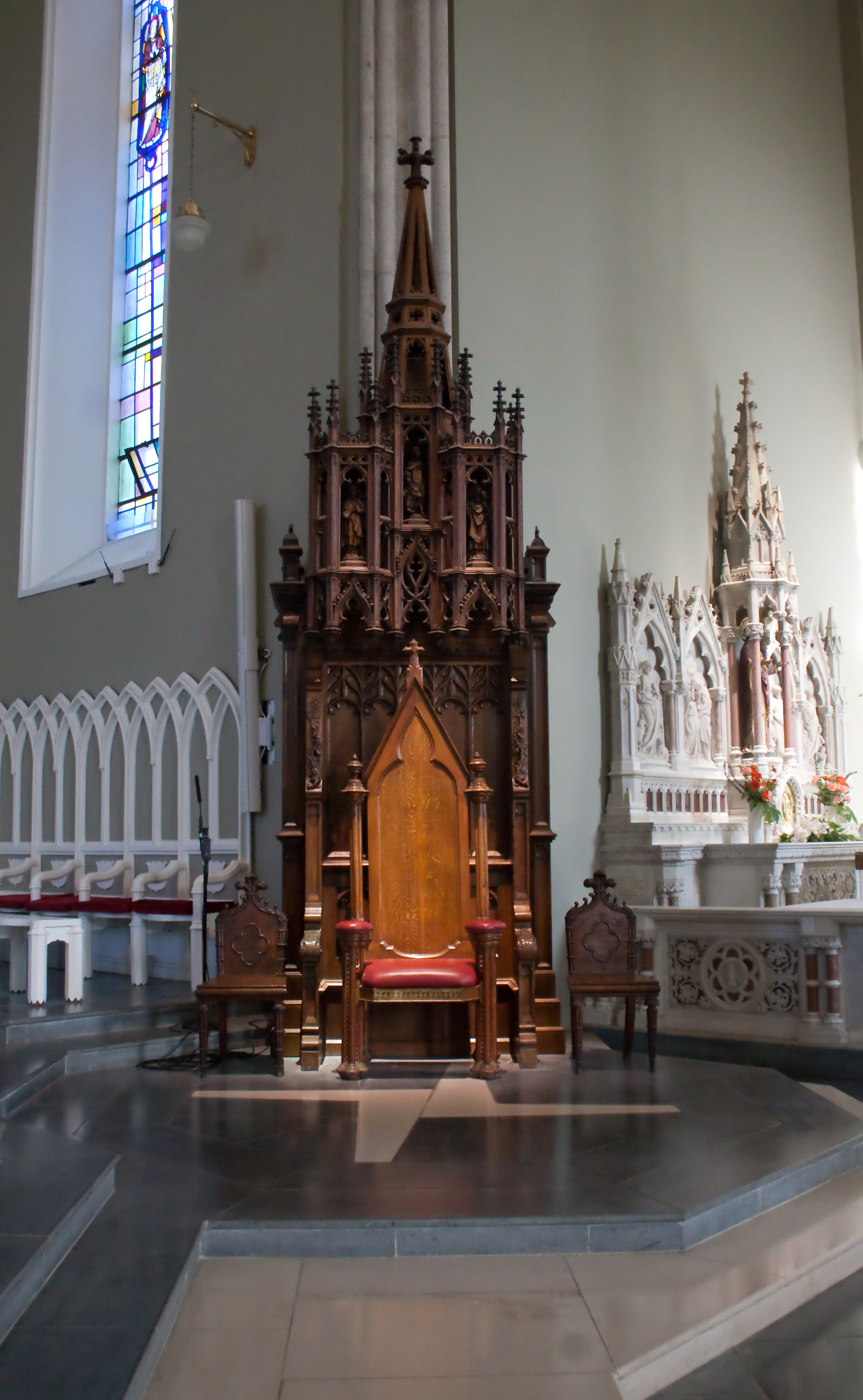
Cathedra of the bishop of Kildare and Leighlin in Carlow Cathedral

The Bishop of Kildare and Leighlin /ˈlɔːxlɪn/ is the ordinary of the Roman Catholic Diocese of Kildare and Leighlin, one of the suffragan dioceses of the Archdiocese of Dublin. The episcopal title takes its name from the towns of Kildare and Old Leighlin in the province of Leinster, Ireland.

The Episcopal see in the town of Carlow where the bishop's seat (Cathedra) is located at the Cathedral Church of the Assumption of the Blessed Virgin Mary.

Between 1678 and 1694, the bishops of Kildare also administered the See of Leighlin. By the decree of the Sacred Congregation for the Propagation of the Faith, the union of the sees of Kildare and Leighlin was approved by Pope Innocent XII on 29 November 1694. However, the first three bishops of the united see continued to each receive a separate appointment as apostolic administrators of Leighlin.

The current bishop is the Most Reverend Denis Nulty who was appointed by Pope Francis on 7 May 2013 and received episcopal ordination at the Cathedral Church of the Assumption of the Blessed Virgin Mary in Carlow on 4 August 2013 from the Most Reverend Diarmuid Martin, Archbishop of Dublin.

== List of Bishops of Kildare and Leighlin ==
Bishops of Kildare and Leighlin
From	Until	Incumbent	Notes
1694	c.1707	John Dempsey	Appointed Bishop of Kildare on 29 November 1694 and Apostolic Administrator of Leighlin on 4 June 1695. Died in office died circa 1707.
c.1707	1715	See vacant	
1715	1724	Edward Murphy	Also recorded Dominic Edward Murphy. Appointed Bishop of Kildare on 11 or 12 September and Apostolic Administrator of Leighlin on 10 March 1716. Consecrated on 18 December 1715. Translated to Dublin on 1 September 1724.
1724	1733	Bernard Dunne	Appointed Bishop of Kildare on 16 December 1724 and Apostolic Administrator of Leighlin on the same day. Died in office before 4 September 1733.
1733	1737	Stephen Dowdall	Appointed bishop of Kildare and Leighlin on 22 December 1733. Died in office before 21 May 1737.
1737	1751	James Gallagher	Translated from Raphoe. Appointed bishop on 18 May 1737. Died in office in May 1751.
1752	1787	James Keeffe	Appointed bishop on 19 January and consecrated on 23 March 1752. Died in office on 18 September 1787.
1781	1782	Richard O'Reilly (coadjutor)	Appointed coadjutor bishop on 20 May and received papal brief on 20 June 1781. Without succeeding translated as coadjutor archbishop to Armagh on 26 February 1782, where succeeded as metropolitan archbishop on 11 November 1787.
1787	1814	Daniel Delany	Appointed coadjutor bishop on 13 April, received papal brief on 13 May, and consecrated on 31 August 1783. Succeeded diocesan bishop on 18 September 1787. Died in office on 9 July 1814.
1814		Arthur Murphy (bishop-elect)	Vicar Capitular of Kildare and Leighlin. Appointed bishop on 25 September and received papal brief on 4 October 1814, but declined the appointment.
1815	1819	Michael Corcoran	Appointed bishop on 12 March, received papal brief on 20 March, and consecrated on 21 September 1815. Died in office on 22 February 1819.
1819	1834	James Doyle, O.E.S.A.	Appointed bishop on 8 August, received papal brief on 27 August, and consecrated on 14 November 1819. Died in office on 15 June 1834.
1834	1837	Edward Nolan	Appointed bishop on 27 July, received papal brief on 8 August, and consecrated on 28 October 1834. Died in office on 14 October 1837.
1838	1855	Francis Haly	Appointed bishop on 28 December 1837, received papal brief on 10 January 1838, and consecrated on 25 March 1838. Died in office on 19 August 1855.
1856	1888	James Walshe	Appointed bishop on 3 February, received papal brief on 29 February, and consecrated on 30 March 1856. Died in office on 5 March 1888.
1888	1896	James Lynch, C.M.	Formerly coadjutor vicar apostolic of the Western District of Scotland (1866–1869). Appointed coadjutor bishop on 4 April and received papal brief on 13 April 1869. Succeeded diocesan bishop on 5 March 1888. Died in office on 19 December 1896.
1888	1895	Michael Comerford (coadjutor)	Appointed coadjutor bishop on 2 November 1888 and consecrated on 1 January 1889. Died without succeeding on 19 August 1895.
1897	1926	Patrick Foley	Appointed coadjutor bishop on 18 March and consecrated on 31 May 1896. Succeeded diocesan bishop on 19 December 1897. Died in office on 24 July 1926.
1927	1936	Matthew Cullen	Appointed bishop on 25 March and consecrated on 5 June 1927. Died in office on 2 January 1936.
1936	1967	Thomas Keogh	Appointed bishop on 8 August and consecrated on 18 October 1936. Retired on 25 September 1967 and appointed Titular Bishop of Turris Tamalleni. Died on 22 May 1969.
1967	1987	Patrick Lennon	Appointed auxiliary bishop of Kildare and Leighlin on 14 May and consecrated on 3 May 1966. Appointed bishop on 25 September 1967. Resigned on 10 December 1987 and died on 12 January 1990.
1987	2002	Laurence Ryan	Appointed coadjutor bishop on 17 July and received episcopal ordination on 9 September 1984. Succeeded diocesan bishop on 10 December 1987. Resigned on 4 June 2002 and died on 13 October 2003.
2002	2010	James Moriarty	Formerly an auxiliary bishop of Dublin (1991–2002). Appointed Bishop of Kildare and Leighlin on 4 June and installed on 31 August 2002. He offered his resignation to Pope Benedict XVI on 23 December 2009, which was accepted on 22 April 2010. Died on 26 March 2022.
2010	2013	See vacant	
2013	present	Denis Nulty	Appointed bishop on 7 May 2013 and received episcopal ordination on 4 August 2013.
