= John J. McIntyre (bishop) =

American Catholic prelate (born 1963)

His Excellency, The Most Reverend John Joseph McIntyre
- Auxiliary Bishop of Philadelphia; Titular Bishop of Bononia
- Church: Catholic Church; Latin Church
- Archdiocese: Philadelphia
- Appointed: June 8, 2010
- Installed: August 6, 2010

Orders
- Ordination: May 16, 1992 by Anthony Joseph Bevilacqua
- Consecration: August 6, 2010 by Justin Francis Rigali, John Patrick Foley, and Joseph Robert Cistone

Personal details
- Born: August 20, 1963 (age 62) Philadelphia, Pennsylvania, US
- Education: St. Alphonsus Seminary, Suffield, Connecticut; St. Charles Borromeo Seminary, Wynnewood, Pennsylvania
- Motto: Spe gaudentes (Latin for 'Joyful hope')

Styles of John Joseph McIntyre
- Reference style: His Excellency; The Most Reverend
- Spoken style: Your Excellency
- Religious style: Bishop

John Joseph McIntyre (born August 20, 1963) is an American prelate of the Catholic Church, serving as an auxiliary bishop of the Archdiocese of Philadelphia in Pennsylvania since August 6, 2010.

== Biography ==
=== Early life and education ===
John McIntyre was born on August 20, 1963, in the Germantown section of Philadelphia, Pennsylvania, one of three sons of Thomas and Blanche (née Ferrero) McIntyre. He received his early education at St. Basil Elementary School of the Ukrainian Archeparchy in Philadelphia. McIntyre attended Father Judge High School in Philadelphia for three years.

Having decided to become a priest, McIntyre left Father Judge after his junior year to enter St. Mary's High School Seminary in Erie, Pennsylvania, operated by the Congregation of the Most Holy Redeemer (the Redemptorists).

After graduating from St. Mary's, McIntyre attended St. Alphonsus Seminary in Suffield, Connecticut, where he earned a Bachelor of Arts in philosophy in 1986. He continued his studies at the Redemptorist House of Studies and the Washington Theological Union in Washington, D.C. Returning to Philadelphia in 1987, he taught at St. Benedict Elementary School in that city for two years. In 1989, McIntyre continued his studies at St. Charles Borromeo Seminary. McIntyre earned a Master of Divinity degree from St. Charles in 1991.

=== Ordination and ministry ===
McIntyre was ordained to the priesthood for the Archdiocese of Philadelphia at the Cathedral Basilica of Saints Peter and Paul by Cardinal Anthony Bevilacqua on May 16, 1992. The archdiocese assigned McIntyre as parochial vicar at the following parishes in Pennsylvania:

- St. Dominic in Philadelphia (1992 to 1995)
- St. Mark in Bristol (1995 to 1999). During this period, he also served on the council of priests and on the admissions board for St. Charles Borromeo Seminary.

In 1999, Bevilacqua named McIntyre as his priest-secretary. When Bishop Justin Rigali became archbishop of Philadelphia in 2003, he kept McIntyre in the same role. He also served as chaplain for the Sisters of Mercy in Merion, Pennsylvania. That same year, the Vatican elevated him to the rank of as a chaplain to his holiness; he became a prelate of honor in 2005.

=== Auxiliary Bishop of Philadelphia ===
On June 8, 2010, McIntyre was appointed auxiliary bishop of Philadelphia and titular bishop of Bononia by Pope Benedict XVI. McIntyre received his episcopal consecration on August 6, 2010, from Rigali at the Cathedral Basilica of SS. Peter and Paul in Philadelphia, with Cardinal John Foley and Bishop Joseph Cistone serving as co-consecrators.. As an auxiliary bishop, McIntyre serves as archdiocesan director of the Secretariat for Evangelization.

== See also ==
- Catholic Church in the United States
- Hierarchy of the Catholic Church
- Historical list of the Catholic bishops of the United States
- List of Catholic bishops in the United States
- Lists of popes, patriarchs, primates, archbishops, and bishops

== Episcopal succession ==
Catholic Church titles
| Preceded by – | Auxiliary Bishop of Philadelphia; 2010–present | Incumbent |
