= St Mary's Knockbeg College =

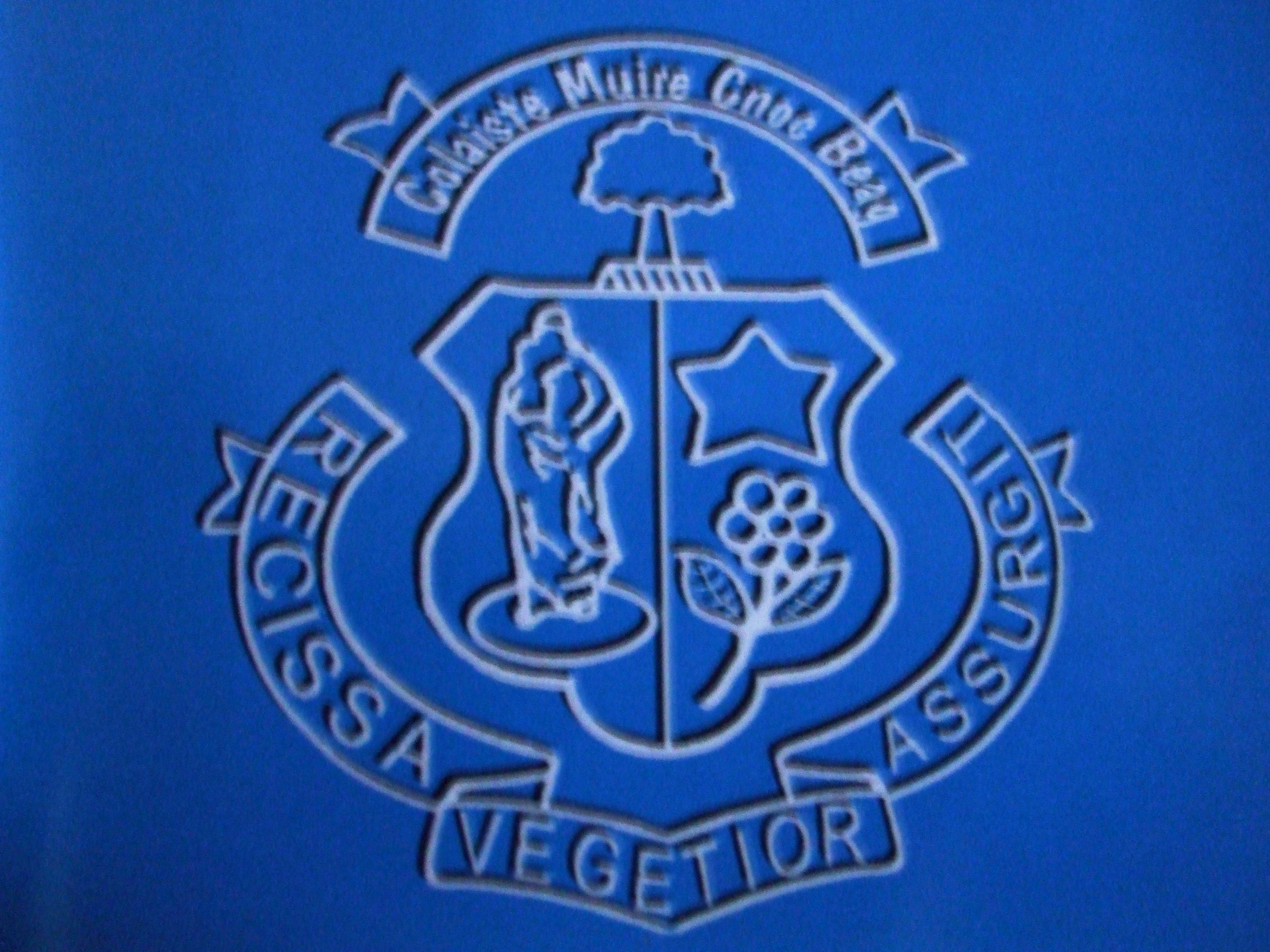

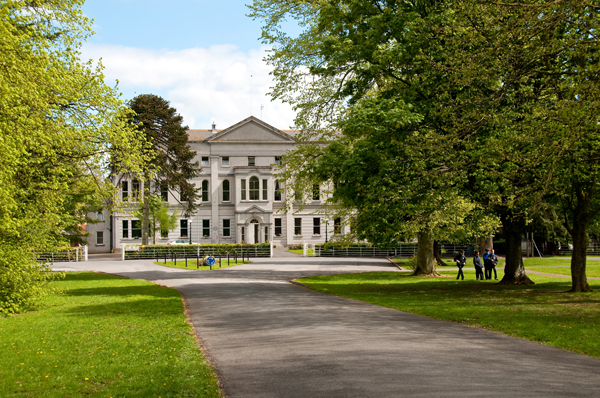

Location
- Counties Laois and Carlow; Ireland; 52°52′1.73″N 6°56′16.32″W

Information
- School type: Public, Voluntary
- Motto: Motto: Recissa Vegetior Assurgit "That what has been cut back will grow stronger"
- Religious affiliation: Catholic
- Denomination: Roman Catholic
- Established: 1793; 233 years ago
- Oversight: Bishop of Kildare and Leighlin
- Rector: Micheal Murphy
- Principal: John Maye
- Gender: Male
- Age range: 12/13 – 18/19
- Enrollment: 400+ students
- Classrooms: 20+
- Colours: Blue and White
- Song: Knockbeg Army
- Sports: Gaelic football, Hurling, Basketball, Athletics
- Yearbook: Knockbeg College Annual
- Website: knockbegcollege.ie

St Mary's Knockbeg College (Irish: Coláiste Muire Cnoc Beag) is a Roman Catholic, all-boys secondary school located on the County Laois–Carlow border in Ireland, approximately 3 km from both Carlow town and Graiguecullen, County Laois. A former seminary school for the diocese of Kildare and Leighlin, it was founded in 1793. Exclusively a boarding school until the 1980s, it now accommodates only day-pupils; the boarding school having closed down in June 2011. Knockbeg College celebrated its bicentenary in 1993.

Knockbeg won the All-Ireland College's Senior Football Championship in 2005, under the guidance of former Laois GAA football captain and current teacher, Chris Conway.

In 2006, Knockbeg were the victors of the Thomas Crosbie Holdings All Ireland Quiz Championship, bringing All-Ireland success to the college twice in two years, and were crowned All-Ireland German Debating Champions in 2008.

== History ==
St Mary's Knockbeg College is one of the oldest secondary schools in Ireland, located on the County Laois–Carlow border. It traces its origins back to 1793 when a lay school for boys was established in St. Patrick's College, Carlow in conjunction with the seminary there. In 1847 it was decided that the young pupils in the school should come out to Knockbeg, which had been a gentry estate on the banks of the River Barrow before being purchased by the Diocese of Kildare and Leighlin, in 1892 all lay students were moved to Knockbeg. The initial school had about 40 pupils but the numbers grew as all the lay pupils from St Patrick's transferred out. In 1898 the school became the official junior seminary for the diocese. To this day the aim of the college is to offer a holistic Catholic education. Through the years the boarding numbers in the school built up to the around 160 mark and has since increased in the 1980s when Day-Boys were taken in. At present, there are well over 350 pupils attending the school.

== Sports ==
Knockbeg College has a long sporting tradition, and in 2005, Knockbeg claimed the Leinster Senior Football College's title after a gap over 50 years. Following this, they went on to claim the Hogan Cup for the first time in their history. Knockbeg has produced many footballers who have played inter-county football for their respective counties. Knockbeg's hurling and basketball teams have also achieved moderate success over the years.This years 1st basketball team have become a top 15 team in Ireland led by Captain Sean bowe and Vice captain Alex brodrick Its athletics team is growing and developing to be one of the most successful athletic schools in the country in track and field and cross country.

This history of sport has led many students to later play for the Laois county football team. This includes past students Donal Kingston, Brian McDonald, Ross Munnelly and Rory Stapleton. In addition, Laois captain Stephen Attride has taught physical education and science at the school.

== Notable alumni ==
- Colm Begley, former Australian Rules Footballer, who played for the Brisbane Lions and St Kilda Saints
- Rev. Dr. Matthew Cullen, Bishop of Kildare and Leighlin (1927–1936)
- Tom Daly, rugby player
- Charles Flanagan, Fine Gael TD for Laois and former Minister for Foreign Affairs and Trade
- Lt. Col. Myles Keogh, second lieutenant of his unit in the papal army's Battalion of St. Patrick (1860–1862) who was made Knight of the Order of St. Gregory the Great by Pope Pius IX. He later became Captain of Company I, 7th U.S. Cavalry Regiment and was killed at the Battle of the Little Bighorn, 1876
- James Fintan Lalor, Irish revolutionary and writer, leading member of the Young Irelanders
- Paddy Lalor, former Fianna Fáil TD for Laois–Offaly, Minister for Industry and Commerce and M.E.P.
- Rev. Dr. Patrick Lennon, Bishop of Kildare and Leighlin (1967–1987).
- Colonel William Murphy, Quartermaster-General of the Irish Army and equestrian.
- Tommy Murphy, former Laois footballer who was named in the midfield position in the GAA Football Team of the Millennium
- Kevin O'Higgins, Irish Nationalist and Pro-Treaty TD for Laois–Offaly, Minister for Home Affairs/Vice-president of the Executive Council in the first Dáil and founder of the Garda Síochána. Assassinated by the Irish Republican Army in 1927
- Frank O'Meara, Carlow-born Irish artist known for his Impressionist, plein air landscape painting (1853–1888). Some of his acclaimed paintings include: Old Woman Burning Leaves, Reverie and Old Mill at Grez
- Liam O'Neill, former Chairman of the Leinster Council and President of the Gaelic Athletic Association, 2012–2015.
- Willie Redmond, Irish nationalist, land reform agitator and Irish Parliamentary Party MP for 34 years who died fighting in World War I
- Rev. Dr. Laurence Ryan, Bishop of Kildare and Leighlin (1987–2002)

== Notable Staff ==
- Gearóid Ó Súilleabháin, a former teacher at the school, best known as the man who raised the tricolour at the GPO at during the 1916 Easter Rising.
