= Henry Staunton =

Henry Staunton may refer to:

- Henry Staunton (businessman) (born 1948), British businessman
- Henry Staunton (priest) (1746–1814), Irish priest and first president of St. Patrick's, Carlow College
- Henry de Staunton, English medieval professor of canon law and university chancellor
