= Francis Haly =

- Bishop of Kildare and Leighlin
- Church: Catholic Church
- Diocese: Diocese of Kildare and Leighlin
- In office: 10 January 1838 – 19 August 1855
- Predecessor: Edward Nolan
- Successor: James Walshe

Orders
- Consecration: 25 March 1838 by Daniel Murray

Personal details
- Born: 1783 Doonane (north of Crettyard), Queen's County, Kingdom of Ireland, British Empire
- Died: 19 August 1855 (aged 71–72)

Francis Haly (1783–1855) was the Roman Catholic Bishop in Kildare and Leighlin from 1838 until his death in 1855. He was born in Doonane, in Co. Laois and entered Maynooth College in 1807 to train as a priest. Initially he served as a curate in Rathvilly in Co. Carlow. He succeeded Bishop Edward Nolan to the see of Kildare and Leighlin in 1838.

He died on 19 August 1855 and is buried in Carlow Cathedral.
