= Cathedral of the Assumption, Carlow =

Cathedral of the Assumption
- Ardeaglais na Deastógála
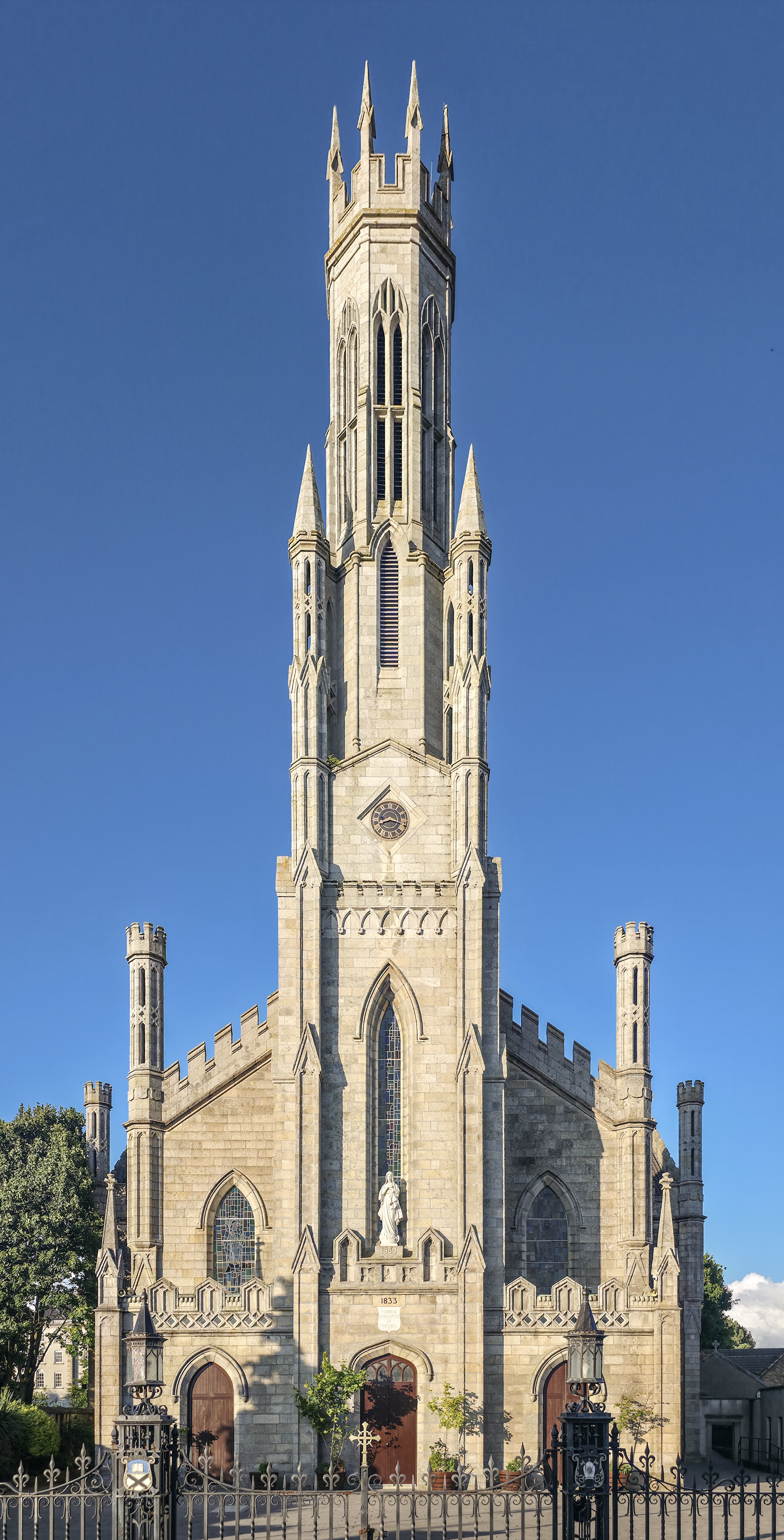

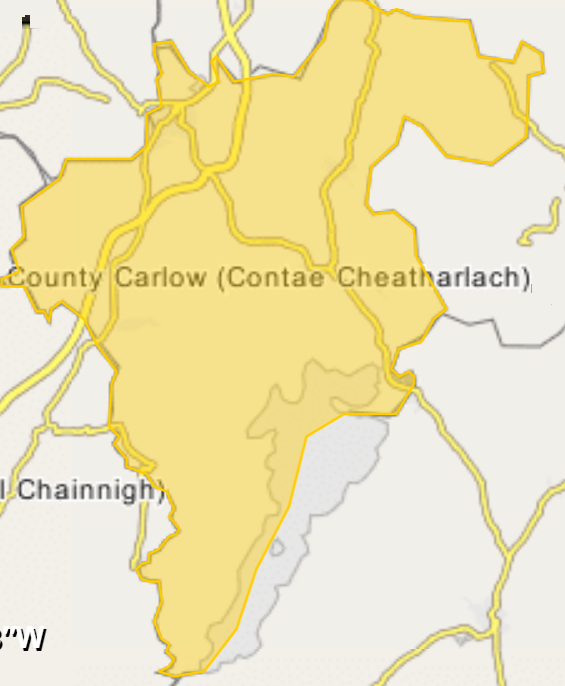
- Location in Ireland Cathedral of the Assumption (Ireland)
- 52°50′13″N 6°55′40″W
- Location: College Street, Carlow, Ireland
- Language: English
- Denomination: Catholic
- Tradition: Roman Rite
- Website: carlowcathedral.ie

History
- Status: Cathedral
- Dedication: Assumption of Mary
- Consecrated: 1833

Architecture
- Style: Gothic revival
- Years built: 5
- Groundbreaking: 7 April 1828
- Completed: 1833
- Construction cost: £9,000

Specifications
- Materials: limestone, white granite, oak

Administration
- Province: Dublin
- Diocese: Kildare and Leighlin
- Parish: Cathedral

Clergy
- Bishop: Denis Nulty

The Cathedral of the Assumption is both the cathedral church of the Roman Catholic Diocese of Kildare and Leighlin and the parish church for the cathedral parish. Located in Carlow town, the cathedral was dedicated to the Assumption of the Blessed Virgin Mary in 1833. It is known for its beautifully detailed 151 ft (46 m) spire which is one of the highest points in the town.

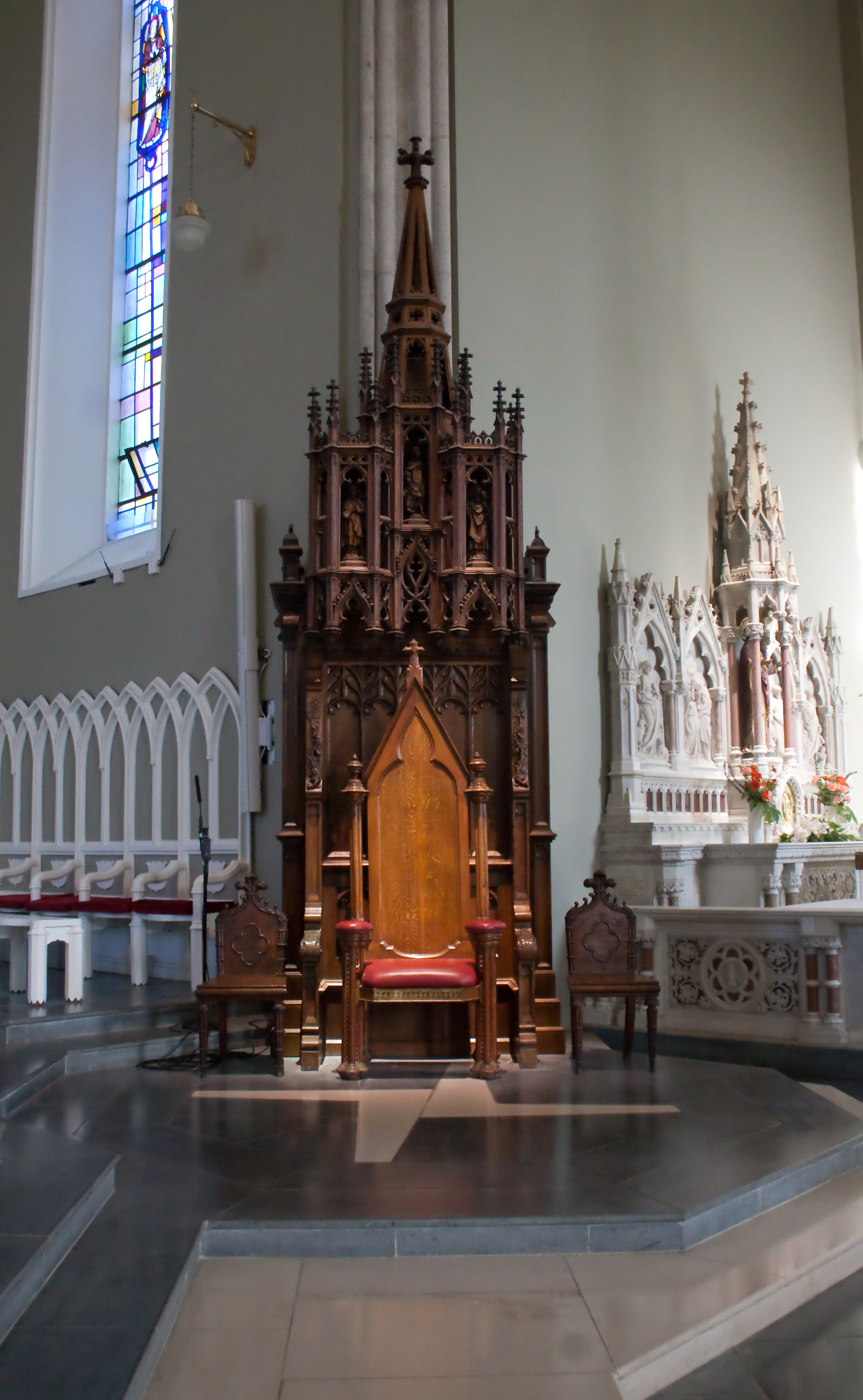
Cathedra

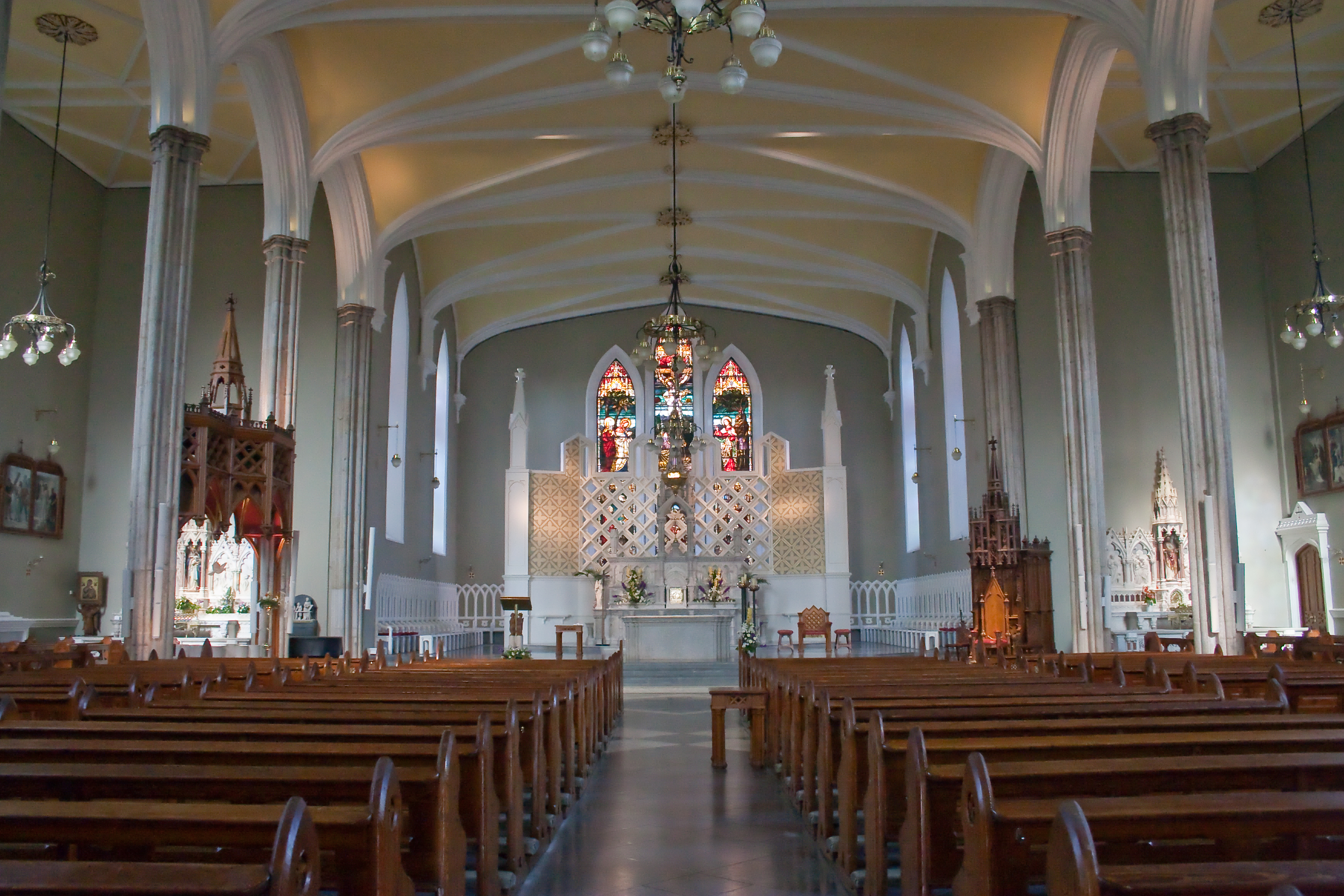
View of nave

== History ==
The foundation stone of the cathedral was laid on 18 March 1828 by Bishop James Doyle. The Cathedral of the Assumption is the second oldest Roman Catholic cathedral built in Ireland, after the Cathedral of the Most Holy Trinity, Waterford, built in 1793; building commenced on the cathedral 7 April 1828.

When the cathedral was completed in 1833, the old church built by Dean Staunton was demolished, although part of the transept wall was retained. The cathedral was dedicated by Bishop Doyle on 1 Dec. 1833; and consecrated by Bishop Matthew Cullen on 30 November 1933. The construction cost £9000. Vestments worn at the dedication by the celebrant, deacon, and subdeacon were made by the Presentation Sisters.

Bishop Doyle died in 1834 at the age of 48 and was interred before the high altar. A monument to Bishop Doyle was placed in the cathedral in 1840, by John Hogan of Tallow, County Waterford. The Holy Family Group, beside the Marion altar, is also attributed to Hogan.

A parishioner took action in the Supreme Court against the Cathedral Administrator, Father John Byrne, and the trustees of the Diocese of Kildare and Leighlin in 1996 to prevent the re-ordering of the interior in line with the changes recommended by the Second Vatican Council. The action was unsuccessful and the changes, including the removal of the altar rails and pulpit, went ahead. The cathedral was rededicated on 22 June 1997 by Bishop Laurence Ryan.

The 2013 Christmas Eve mass was broadcast on RTÉ and the Christmas Day Eurovision mass celebrated by Bishop Denis Nulty was broadcast to Europe from the cathedral. The 2003 Easter ceremonies were broadcast to Europe from Carlow as well.

Ahead of the World Meeting of Families 2018 in Dublin, Cardinal Peter Turkson from Ghana was announced as homilist at the opening ceremony at this cathedral.

== Choirs ==
The Carlow Cathedral Choir was established in the 1960s under Dr. Karl Seeldrayers the Carlow Cathedral organist, who also founded the interdenominational Carlow Choral Society originally named the Carlow Choral Union in 1965. Fr. Liam Lawton served as director of music at the cathedral from 1987 to 1999. There is a youth choir, at the cathedral and a chamber choir Cathedral Schola was founded in 2009.

== Architecture ==
The cathedral is built next door to St. Patrick's, Carlow College, the former seminary of the diocese. Architect Thomas Cobden, designer of much of the adjacent college, designed the cathedral, in the Gothic Revival style. The tower and lantern was inspired by the Belfry of Bruges, Belgium. The grey-blue stone was from the quarry on the Tullow Road. Colonel Henry Bruen of Oak Park supplied granite from his quarry in Graiguenaspidogue a few kilometres south of Carlow town. He also supplied the Oak for the great-framed roof which came from nearby Oak Park.

In 1873, Bishop Keeffe's grand-niece donated two Caen stone altars to replace the wooden side altars. They were later removed, one to the college chapel, and one to the presbytery. The stone side altars themselves were later replaced with marble. The Sacred Heart altar was a gift of Mary Agnes Kinsella, of the Royal Hotel, in memory of her brother Edward. Its stone predecessor sent to the Paulstown parish church. The Lady altar erected in 1904 was donated by Mr. and Mrs. Michael Molloy, and the previous stone altar sent to Tinryland. In 1878, Miss Keeffe donated a stained-glass window depicting St. Patrick, for the north transept, in memory of her grand-uncle.

=== Furnishings ===
In 1855, an organ, purchased at the Paris Exhibition, was installed in the south transept, but later moved to the gallery. It was replaced in 1944.

Extensive refurbishment was carried out in 1899 under Bishop Michael Comerford. A carved oak pulpit was designed by C.J. Buckley of Youghal and made in Bruges in 1898. The ornately carved pulpit is now in the Carlow County Museum. The main altar of Sicilian marble replaced the original wooden one. The new altar was consecrated by Bishop Comerford on 25 May 1890. It was made by Samuel Daly and Sons of Cork, and donated by the clergy and religious of the diocese in memory of the Very Rev. James Walsh, Bishop from 1856 to 1888. Bishop Walsh is buried in the cathedral in the same grave as his kinsman, Bishop Delany. Comerford also gave and consecrated the great bell, cast by John Warren and Sons of London. The oak-framed Stations of the Cross, donated by various Carlow families, were erected in 1896.

In 1902 the stone baptismal font was replaced by a marble one as a memorial from the people of Carlow of Rev. John Corbett C.C., who died in accident while out shooting. The marble communion rails were installed in 1903. The Episcopal chair, fashioned in Bruges, is of panelled oak from the nearby estate of Oak Park. The marble statue of St. Patrick next to the Sacred Heart altar was a gift from the priests of the diocese in memory of Bishop Patrick Foley.

During the refurbishment in the 1990s, new works were installed including a new altar and baptismal font by Michael Hoy. The organ was cleaned and tuned by the Irish Organ Company.

== Burials ==
- Bishop James Warren Doyle, O.E.S.A. (1819–1834)
- Bishop James Walsh (1856–1888)
- Bishop Patrick Foley (1896–1926)
- Bishop Thomas Keogh DD (1936–1967)
- Bishop Patrick Lennon DD (1967–1987)
- Bishop Laurence Ryan DD (1987–2002)
