= Laurence Ryan =

The Very Reverend Laurence Ryan
- Bishop of Kildare and Leighlin
- Church: Catholic Church
- Diocese: Kildare and Leighlin
- Appointed: 17 July 1984
- Installed: 10 December 1987
- Term ended: 4 June 2002

Orders
- Ordination: 17 June 1956
- Consecration: 9 September 1984 by Patrick Lennon

Personal details
- Born: 13 May 1931 St Mullin's, County Carlow, Ireland
- Died: 13 October 2003 (aged 72) Beaumont Hospital, Dublin, Ireland
- Education: Maynooth College

Laurence Ryan was an Irish priest, theologian and Bishop of Kildare and Leighlin.

== Biography ==
Laurence Ryan was born in 1931, to Michael and Brigid Ryan of Ballycrinnigan, St Mullin's, County Carlow.

He was educated locally and at St. Mary's Knockbeg College; he went to Maynooth College to study for the priesthood. He was ordained in 1956 and following postgraduate studies awarded a doctorate in 1958; subsequently he was appointed to the staff of the St. Patrick's College, Carlow. He studied in Germany for a year gaining a Doctorate in Theology.

He served as President of Carlow College from 1974 to 1980, and was appointed in 1975 Vicar General for the Diocese of Kildare and Leighlin.

Leaving Carlow College, Ryan served as parish priest of Naas, County Kildare, from 1980 to 1985. He was award the title of Monsignor.

Ryan was appointed coadjutor bishop in 1984 and became Bishop of Kildare and Leighlin on 10 December 1987, succeeding Bishop Lennon. Bishop Ryan resigned 4 June 2002 and retired.

During his time at Carlow Cathedral, he presided over some changes to the altar which were controversial.

Ryan died on 13 October 2003, in Beaumont Hospital in Dublin.

Catholic Church titles
Preceded by Patrick Lennon	Bishop of Kildare and Leighlin; 1987–2002	Succeeded by Jim Moriarty
