= Michael Corcoran (bishop) =

Bishop of Kildare and Leighlin (1815 –1819)

Michael Corcoran (1758 – 22 February 1819) was the Roman Catholic Bishop of Kildare and Leighlin from 1815 until his death in 1819.

== Biography ==
A native of Co. Laois, he served on mission in Dublin before being appointed as the parish priest of Balyna, Co. Kildare, later being appointed parish priest in Kildare in 1802. During his time in Kildare he worked to calm tensions leading up to and after the 1798 Rebellion, with efforts such as liaising with the Church of Ireland priest there to avoid trouble between their parishioners; he also disciplined a priest in his parish, Fr. Mogue Kearns, for the latter's rebel sympathies.

Following the death of Bishop Daniel Delany of Kildare and Leighlin in 1814, Arthur Murphy was appointed, but this appointment was not accepted. In 1815, Corcoran was appointed Bishop of Kildare and Leighlin.

Corcoran died on 22 February 1819. He is buried in Tullow.
