= Stephen Dowdall =

Stephen Dowdall (born in Navan) was an Irish clergyman and bishop for the Roman Catholic Diocese of Kildare and Leighlin. He became ordained in 1733. He was appointed bishop in 1734. He died in 1737.
