= James Walshe =

Catholic bishop and President of St. Patrick's, Carlow College

James Walsh
- Bishop in Kildare and Leighlin
- Archdiocese: Dublin
- Province: Kildare
- Diocese: Kildare and Leighlin
- Installed: 1856
- Term ended: 1888
- Predecessor: Francis Haly
- Successor: James Lynch CM
- Previous post: President of Carlow College

Orders
- Ordination: 1830(priest) by Bishop John Dunne
- Consecration: 1856(bishop) by Paul Cullen

Personal details
- Born: 30 June 1803 New Ross, County Wexford
- Died: 5 March 1888 (aged 84)
- Denomination: Roman Catholic
- Parents: Philip Walshe; Mary Walshe(née Doyle)
- Profession: Professor
- Education: Classical School, New Ross
- Alma mater: St Peter's College, Wexford; Carlow College

James Walshe (1803-1888) was an Irish Catholic priest and bishop in Kildare and Leighlin; before becoming a bishop he was president of Carlow College, where he had previously been a professor. He was born 30 June 1803 in New Ross, County Wexford, to Philip Walshe, and his wife, Mary Walshe (née Doyle, a cousin of the Bishop of Kildare and Leighlin, James Warren Doyle "JKL", and a lecturer at Carlow College).

He was educated, at the commercial and classical school in New Ross, records show that he went to Dublin to study medicine, but he returned to Wexford and went to study at St Peter's College, Wexford from 1823 to 1826 when he went to St. Patrick s College, Carlow to complete his theological studies and where he was ordained priest in 1830. He was appointed professor of humanities, of moral philosophy, and theology, in Carlow College. He then served as curate in the cathedral parish in Carlow, following this he was appointed vice-president of the college and professor of Greek and sacred scripture. Following the retirement of Taylor, in 1850, Walshe was appointed president.

On the death of the Bishop Francis Haly, in 1855, Walshe was appointed Bishop of Kildare and Leighlin He was an advocate for temperance issuing a number of pastorals and sermons on the merits of temperance and evils of intemperance.

He died on 5 March 1888.
