= Denis Nulty =

Irish Roman Catholic bishop

The Most Reverend Denis Nulty KC*HS
- Bishop of Kildare and Leighlin
- Church: Roman Catholic
- Diocese: Kildare and Leighlin
- Appointed: 7 May 2013
- Installed: 4 August 2013
- Predecessor: James Moriarty
- Previous posts: Apostolic administrator of Ossory; Parish priest of St Mary's, Drogheda; Vicar forane of the Duleek deanery Chairperson of the council of priests of the Diocese of Meath

Orders
- Ordination: 12 June 1988 by Michael Smith
- Consecration: 4 August 2013 by Diarmuid Martin

Personal details
- Born: 7 June 1963 (age 63) Slane, County Meath, Ireland
- Education: St. Patrick's College, Maynooth; All Hallows College; Dublin City University
- Motto: Serve the Lord with gladness
- Coat of arms

Styles of Denis Nulty
- Reference style: The Most Reverend
- Spoken style: Your Grace
- Religious style: Bishop

Denis Nulty KC*HS (born 7 June 1963) is an Irish Roman Catholic prelate who has served as Bishop of Kildare and Leighlin since 2013.

== Early life ==
Nulty was born in Slane, County Meath, on 7 June 1963, the youngest of five children to Den Nulty and his wife Nan (née Balfe).

He attended primary school at St. Patrick's National School, Slane, and secondary school at St Patrick's Classical School, Navan, before studying for the priesthood at St Patrick's College, Maynooth, in 1981, obtaining a Bachelor of Arts in 1984 and a Bachelor of Divinity in 1987.

He was ordained to the priesthood for the Diocese of Meath on 12 June 1988.

== Presbyteral ministry ==
Following his ordination, Nulty served for ten years as a curate in the cathedral parish of Mullingar, as well as chaplain to the local Accord centre and spiritual director at St Finian's College. He became the youngest parish priest in Ireland when he was appointed to St Mary’s parish, Drogheda, in August 1998.

Nulty completed further studies in All Hallows College, Dublin, and obtained a Master of Arts in Management for Pastoral and Voluntary Services from Dublin City University in 2006.

He was also appointed chairperson of the diocesan council of priests in 2005, and later as vicar forane for the Duleek deanery in September 2006.

== Episcopal ministry ==
=== Bishop of Kildare and Leighlin ===
Nulty was appointed Bishop-elect of Kildare and Leighlin by Pope Francis on 7 May 2013, becoming the youngest bishop in Ireland by succeeding the Archbishop of Armagh, Eamon Martin, by two years. He was consecrated by the Archbishop of Dublin, Diarmuid Martin, on 4 August in the Cathedral of the Assumption, Carlow.

In light of the Government decision to hold a referendum on same-sex marriage in 2015, Nulty emphasised in November 2013 said while there is always a need to treat homosexuals with compassion, he added that the very nature of marriage and children and their importance to society are worth protecting, saying that "[the] Catholic Church will continue to hold that the differences between a man and woman are not accidental to marriage but fundamental to it and that children have a natural right to a mother and a father and that this is the best environment for them where possible".

Ahead of a referendum on easing divorce restrictions in May 2019, he issued a statement suggesting that "the objective of the proposed referendum is not to support marriage, rather to liberalise divorce", and that "it is imperative that we continue to work together to promote marriage and family.”

=== Apostolic Administrator of Ossory ===
Following the installation of Dermot Farrell as Archbishop of Dublin on 2 February 2021, Nulty was announced as Apostolic Administrator of Ossory. He served in this role until the consecration of Niall Coll as Bishop of Ossory on 22 January 2023.

Following the easing of restrictions brought about by the COVID-19 pandemic, Nulty announced on 4 July that for the first time in living memory, a confirmation ceremony would take place in the open-air surroundings of a GAA stadium, with 392 primary school children from four parishes in Kilkenny city receiving the sacrament on 9 September in Nowlan Park, Kilkenny. A similar ceremony took place for 361 primary school children from seven schools in Portlaoise on 18 September in O'Moore Park, Portlaoise.

Catholic Church titles
Preceded by James Moriarty	Bishop of Kildare and Leighlin since 7 August 2013	Succeeded by incumbent
