= Patrick Lennon (bishop) =

- Bishop of Kildare and Leighlin
- Church: Catholic Church
- Diocese: Diocese of Kildare and Leighlin
- In office: 25 September 1967 – 10 December 1987
- Predecessor: Thomas Keogh
- Successor: Laurence Ryan
- Previous posts: Titular Bishop of Vina (1966-1967); Auxiliary Bishop of Kildare and Leighlin (1966-1967)

Orders
- Ordination: 19 June 1938
- Consecration: 3 July 1966 by Giuseppe Sensi

Personal details
- Born: 22 June 1914 Borris, County Carlow, United Kingdom of Great Britain and Ireland
- Died: 12 January 1990 (aged 75) Kill, County Kildare, Ireland

Patrick Lennon (22 June 1914 – 12 January 1990) was an Irish priest who served as Bishop of Kildare and Leighlin.

Patrick Lennon was born in 1914 at Borris, County Carlow. Both his parents were primary school teachers. He was educated locally and at Ring College, Rockwell College and Knockbeg College.

He attended Maynooth College earning a BSc in physics and mathematics (1934), and was ordained a priest there on 19 June 1938, pursuing postgraduate studies he obtained a doctorate in divinity with a thesis on the Eucharist.

His brother Fr. Thomas Lennon SMA, also went on to become a priest, serving in Africa and Ireland.

In 1940 he went to Carlow College where he was appointed Professor of Moral Theology, he was to stay at Carlow for the next 26 years, becoming Vice-President in 1949 and subsequently President of St. Patrick's Carlow, College from 1956 until 1966.

He was appointed auxiliary Bishop of Kildare and Leighlin (Titular Bishop of Vina) and parish priest of Mountmellick, Co. Laois in July 1966, and in September 1967 Bishop of Kildare and Leighlin. He retired on 10 December 1987.

He was Patron of the Old Carlow Society.

He died in a car accident in Kill, County Kildare, on 12 January 1990.

Catholic Church titles
Preceded by Thomas Keogh	Bishop of Kildare and Leighlin; 1967–1987	Succeeded by Laurence Ryan
