= Turris Tamalleni =

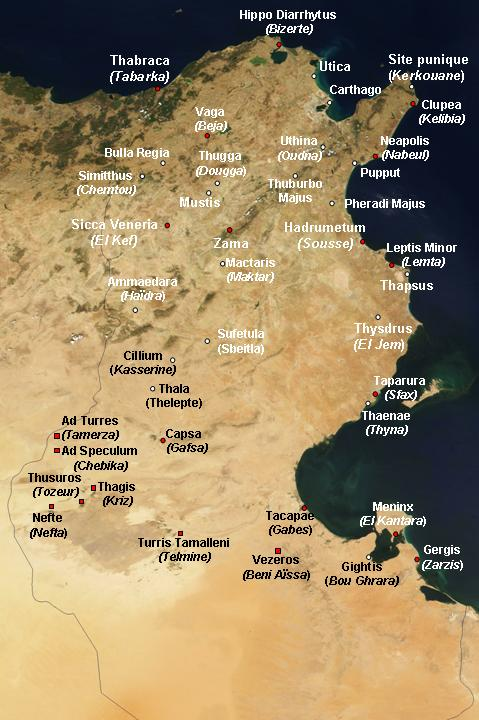
Map showing Turris Tamalleni

Turris Tamalleni was a town in North Africa, dating from the Carthageinian, Roman, Byzantine and Vandal era.

== Geography ==
The town was west of Tacapes and South of Capsa. It is located on the oasis of Mansura, 1.5 kilometers from Telmine and 7.5 kilometers from Kebili.

== History ==
Turris Tamalleni town was founded before Carthage, when the Nybgenii Tribe established a fortified granary and a fortified residence for the tribal head. It was renamed in the 1st century C. Civitas Nybgenorium, and remained the center of the Nybgenii Tribe and the name Turres is probably the indigenous name. It was originally a fort on the Roman Limes, and linked by Roman Road under Domitian. Later it became a municipium under Hadrian(about 105AD) taking the name Turris Tamalleni. It is mentioned in the Antonine Itinerary on the road on the borders of Tripoli and Leptis Magna. During the latter Roman era it was a Bishop's seat and a center of resistance of the Almoravids. The city was taken and destroyed by the Almohads in 1205AD. An Arab town called Torrah or telmin was built from the rubble of the Roman town and is identified as the ruins of Oum-Es-Samâa. Today, nothing remains of the ancient city. All that remains of the ancient town is two large irrigation basins separated by a wall, which were restored in 1780 by the Bey of Tunis. They form a lake of one hectare.

== Bishopric ==
The Bishopric, founded in the fourth century, ceased to function with the arrival of the Arab forces, but remains a titular see of the Roman Catholic Church. The current titular bishop is Linus Lee Seong-hyo, auxiliary bishop of Suwon.

=== Bishops ===
- Gaudenzio assisted the Carthaginian council called by Grato in 349.
- At the Carthage conference of 411, which saw the Catholic and Donatist bishops of Roman Africa gathered together, the Catholic Sabratius and the Donatist Jurata represented the city.
- Habetdeum intervened at the synod gathered in Carthage by Huneric the Vandal king in 484, after which Habetdeum was exiled.
- Pentasio attended the antimonotelite council of 641.
- Thomas Keogh (25 Sep 1967 Appointed - 22 May 1969)
- Francis John Dunn (1 Jun 1969 Appointed - 17 Nov 1989)
- Alphonse Liguori Chaupa (24 Jun 2000 Appointed - 4 Jul 2003)
- Paul Ponen Kubi, (24 Dec 2003 Appointed - 15 Jul 2006)
- Damián Santiago Bitar (4 Oct 2008 Appointed - 26 Oct 2010 )
- Linus Lee Seong-hyo (7 Feb 2011 Appointed - )
