= Patrician Brothers =

Catholic lay religious congregation of Pontifical Right for men

Brothers of Saint Patrick
- Congregatio Fratrum a Sancto Patricio
- Abbreviation: FSP
- Nickname: Patrician Brothers
- Formation: 2 February 1808; 218 years ago
- Founder: Bishop Daniel Delany
- Type: Lay Religious Congregation of Pontifical Right for men
- Headquarters: Generalate: Delany Place, 18 Boomerang Road, The Entrance, NSW 2261, Australia
- Members: 164 members as of 2020
- Motto: Latin: Christus in Corde Omnium; English: Christ is in all Hearts
- Superior General: Br Paul O'Keeffe
- Ministry: Educational works
- Parent organization: Catholic Church
- Website: www.patricianbrothers.org

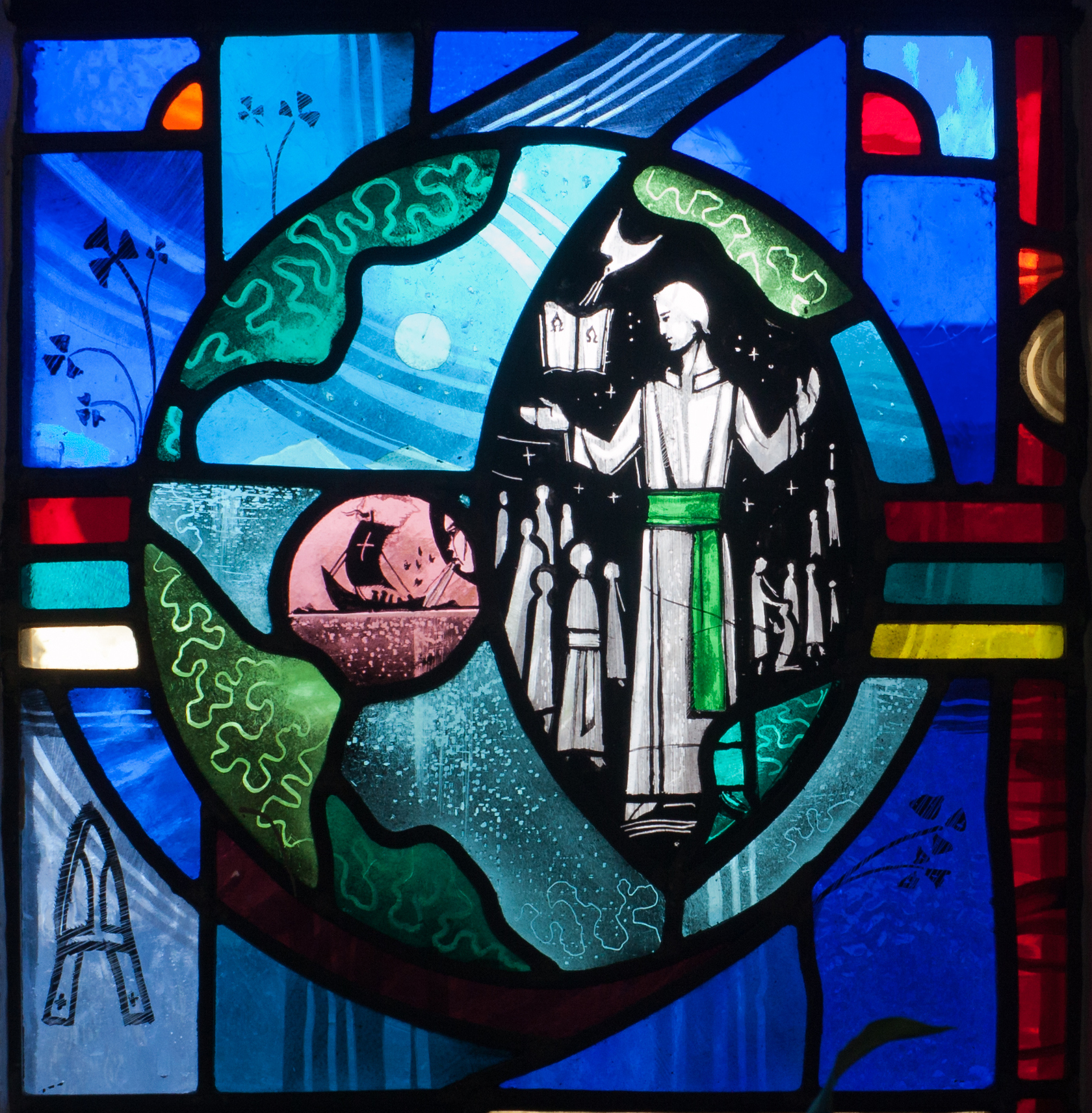
A teaching Patrician Brother in his habit on a stained glass window in Tullow, designed and created by George Walsh.

The Patrician Brothers officially named Brothers of Saint Patrick (Latin: Fratres Sancti Patricii), abbreviated F.S.P. is a Catholic lay religious congregation of Pontifical Right for men founded for the religious and literary education of the youth and the instruction of the faithful in Christian piety.

The Patrician Brothers are an Ireland-based Roman Catholic congregation

== History ==
The Congregation of the Brothers of St. Patrick was founded by Bishop Daniel Delany, on the feast of the Purification of the Blessed Virgin Mary, on 2 February 1808. The four founding members were Patrick McMahon (Brother John Baptist), Richard Fitzpatrick (Brother Bernard), Ambrose Dawson (Brother Joseph) and Maurice Cummins (Brother John Evangelist). Under the personal instruction of the bishop, the group of men was established as a diocesan institution.

In succeeding years, branches were established in other dioceses of Ireland. Around 1846, they were in charge of a trade school near Baltimore, Maryland, in America. The Brothers were invited by several Indian and Australian bishops to erect schools in their dioceses. Several foundations were made, among them those of Sydney, to which archdiocese the Brothers were invited by Cardinal Moran; and that of Madras in India in 1875, undertaken at the request of Bishop Stephen Fennelly.

For the first eighty years, the Brothers were under the authority of their respective bishops. However, in 1885 the Brothers made application to the Holy See for the approval of the institute, to constitute a central governance board and to establish a common novitiate. Sounding opinions from the bishops in whose dioceses the Brothers were established, Pope Leo XIII provisionally approved the congregation for five years by a Rescript dated 6 January 1888, and, on 8 September 1893, he issued a decree of final confirmation. This included approving their rules and constitution, the facilities and powers necessary for their institute, and constituting India and Australia as separate Provinces. The Brothers of the Provinces of Ireland, India, and Australia, were now under the authority of their elected Congregation Leader and his Council. From 1888 to 2010, the Congregation Leader lived in Ireland, since then India and Australia.

The archive of the Patrician Brothers is stored in the Delany Archive in Carlow College.

== Work scope ==
As of 2022, there were 160 Patrician Brothers serving in seven countries: Ireland (1808), India (1875), Australia (1883), USA (1948), Kenya (1961), Papua New Guinea (1968), Ghana (2008). The Brothers have also ministered in Yemen, Dubai, South Sudan, and Qatar. The largest Province is that of India-Ghana 106 Brothers.

The scope of their work embraces mainly primary, secondary, and tertiary education. But there are Brothers who work in parishes, health centres, and centres for homeless children.

== Notable Patrician Brothers ==
- Br Serenus OKelly, Pioneer, (1780–1859)
- Br Paul O'Connor, Galway Pioneer, (1796–1878)
- Br. Dermot Dunne, Superior General & Historian, Patrician Brothers (1950–1956)
- Br. Augustine Holton, Superior General (1980–1986)
- Br Linus Walker, Patrician Historian (1930–2021)
- Br. Colm O'Connell, missionary teacher, and athletics coach
