= Henry Staunton (priest) =

Irish priest and academic leader

Henry Staunton, (d. 2 September 1814) often called Dean Staunton, was an Irish priest and first president of St. Patrick's, Carlow College in 1792.

== Life ==
Henry Staunton was born at Hill House, Kellymount, Paulstown, County Kilkenny, around 1746. He was educated locally and went to study for the priesthood in Paris. Upon returning to Ireland, he served in the parish of Graiguenamanagh. Following the death of Dean Gernon, P.P. of Carlow, in March 1787, Henry Staunton was appointed his successor; he was also appointed Dean of Leighlin. In 1787, Staunton built a sizeable church on the later site of Carlow Cathedral.

With the closing of the seminaries in France during the Revolution, in 1793, Bishop Daniel Delany, of the Diocese of Kildare and Leighlin, founded a diocesan College at Carlow. Dr. Staunton was appointed its first president. Dean Staunton approached the founding of the college with zeal, however he was known somewhat as an eccentric. He never accepted a salary for his position in Carlow College.

In 1811 he helped the Presentation Sisters set up in Carlow, by giving them money to purchase a house. In 1813 he also founded a free school in Carlow.

Dean Staunton died on 2 September 1814 initially he was buried in his own parish church but around 1828 his remains were re-interred in Carlow College cemetery. He was replaced as president of Carlow College by Rev. Andrew Fitzgerald.
