= Bononia (titular see) =

Bononia, once the residential episcopal see of the city of Bononia (now Vidin) in Bulgaria, is a titular see of the Catholic Church.

== History ==
The city of Bononia lay within the ancient Roman province of Dacia Ripensis. Under its present name of Vidin, it is part of Bulgaria.

It was important enough to become a suffragan bishopric of the Metropolitan Archbishop of the provincial capital Raziaria. The Latin adjective by which the diocese is referred to is Bononiensis.

== Titular see ==
The diocese was nominally restored in 1933 as Latin Catholic titular bishopric of Bononia (Latin = Curiate Italian) / Bononien(sis) (Latin adjective).

It has had the following incumbents, so far of the fitting Episcopal (lowest) rank :

- Antoine Caillot (12 December 1961 – 24 March 1964) as Coadjutor Bishop of Évreux (France) (1961.12.12 – 1964.03.24); next succeeded as Bishop of Évreux (1964.03.24 – retired 1972.04.12), died 1994
- John Burke (born Ireland) (3 August 1966 – death 24 July 1970) as emeritate; previously Apostolic Administrator of Archdiocese of Delhi and Simla (India) (1950 – 1951.04.12), only Bishop of (newly split-off) Simla (India) (1959.06.04 – 1964.05.12), (see) restyled 'first' Bishop of Simla and Chandigarh (India) (1964.05.12 – retired 1966.08.03)
- José Julio Aguilar García (5 December 1970 – 2 November 1972) as Bishop-Prelate of Territorial Prelature of Escuintla (in his native Guatemala) (1969.05.09 – 1972.11.02); later Bishop of Santa Cruz de la Sierra (Bolivia) (1972.11.02 – retired 1974.08.22), died 1999
- Pablo Antonio Vega Mantilla (30 January 1973 – 30 April 1991) as last Bishop-Prelate of Territorial Prelature of Juigalpa (Nicaragua) (1970.11.16 – 1991.04.30), President of Episcopal Conference of Nicaragua (1983 – 1985); (see) promoted first Bishop of Juigalpa (Nicaragua) (1991.04.30 – 1993.10.29), died 2007
- James Moriarty (26 June 1991 – 4 June 2002) as Auxiliary Bishop of Archdiocese of Dublin (Ireland) (1991.06.26 – 2002.06.04); later Bishop of Kildare and Leighlin (Ireland) (2002.06.04 – retired 2010.04.22)
- Milan Šášik, Vincentians (C.M.) (born Slovakia) (12 November 2002 – 17 March 2010) as Apostolic Administrator of Mukacheve of the Ruthenians (Ukraine) (2002.11.12 – 2010.03.17); next succeeded as Eparch (Eastern Catholic Bishop) of Mukacheve of the Ruthenians (2010.03.17 – ...)
- John J. McIntyre (8 June 2010 – ...), as Auxiliary Bishop of Archdiocese of Philadelphia (US) (2010.06.08 – ...).

== Sources and external links ==
- GCatholic with titular incumbent biography links

Bibliography - ecclesiastical history

- lemma 'Bononia', in Dictionnaire d'Histoire et de Géographie ecclésiastiques, vol. IX, Paris 1937, coll. 1089-1090
