= Matthew Cullen (bishop) =

Rev Dr. Matthew Cullen DD
- Bishop in Kildare and Leighlin
- Archdiocese: Dublin
- Province: Kildare
- Diocese: Kildare and Leighlin
- Installed: 1927
- Term ended: 1936
- Predecessor: Dr. Patrick Foley
- Successor: Thomas Keogh
- Previous posts: Rector Knockbeg College; Curate; Parish Priest

Orders
- Ordination: 1889

Personal details
- Born: 17 March 1864 Hacketstown, County Wicklow
- Died: 2 January 1936 (aged 71)
- Denomination: Roman Catholic
- Parents: Matthew Cullen and Elizabeth Kehoe
- Education: Carlow College; Maynooth College

Matthew Cullen (1864-1936) was an Irish Catholic priest and Bishop of Kildare and Leighlin.

== Life ==
Matthew Cullen was born in Kilcarney, County Wicklow in the parish of Hacketstown on St. Patrick's Day, 1864 to Matthew and Elizabeth Kehoe Cullen. He commenced his clerical studies in St. Patrick's, Carlow College, and continued them in Maynooth. He was ordained in 1889 and served initially as a curate in Geashill, Killeigh and the Tinyland, he served as chaplain to the Curragh Army camp.

== Career and activities ==
Cullen served as rector to St. Mary's Knockbeg College from 1895 until 1909, when he moved to Newbridge, prior to being appointed parish priest of Tinyland and then Bagenalstown before being elected a bishop.

He was a keen supporter of Gaelic Games and regularly attended GAA matches in Kildare and Carlow.

In 1927 he was appointed Bishop of Kildare and Leighlin, succeeding Dr. Patrick Foley and served until his death. On 30 November 1933 Bishop Cullen consecrated the Cathedral of the Assumption in Carlow.

Cullen encouraged and facilitated the establishment of St Patrick's Missionary Society at Kiltegan.

=== Death ===
He died on 2 January 1936. Following his death Carlow GAA Stadium, which had just been completed, was named Dr. Cullen Park in his honour.

Catholic Church titles
Preceded by Patrick Foley	Bishop of Kildare and Leighlin; 1927–1936	Succeeded by Thomas Keogh
