= Daniel Delany =

Irish bishop (1747–1814)

- Bishop of Kildare and Leighlin
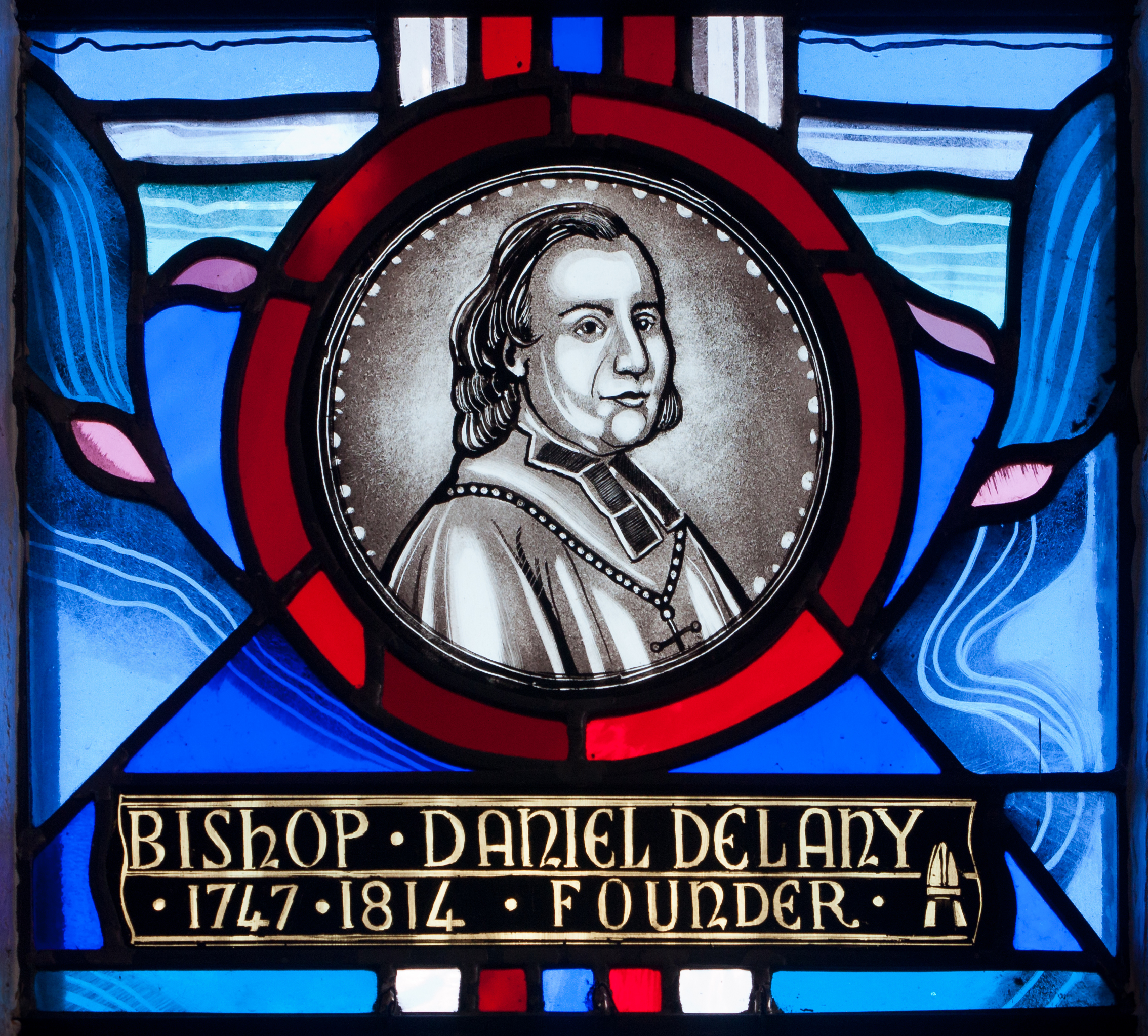
- Stained glass window by George Walsh in Tullow
- Province: Dublin
- Diocese: Kildare and Leighlin
- See: Dublin
- Appointed: 1788
- Predecessor: Dr James Keeffe
- Previous post: Coadjutor Bishop

Orders
- Ordination: 1771

Personal details
- Born: February 1747 Mountrath, Paddock, Laois, Ireland
- Died: 9 July 1814 (aged 67) Tullow, County Carlow, Ireland
- Buried: Tullow, County Carlow, Ireland
- Denomination: Roman Catholic
- Education: Irish College, Paris
- Motto: Fortiter et Suaviter

Daniel Delany DD (February 1747, in Paddock, Mountrath, Laois, Ireland – 9 July 1814, in Tullow, County Carlow) was the Roman Catholic Bishop of Kildare and Leighlin. Educated at the Irish College in Paris, he taught at the English Boys College of St Omer, 265 kilometres north of Paris.

In 1783, Delany was appointed coadjutor to James Keeffe, Bishop of Kildare and Leighlin. Together, they established St. Patrick's, Carlow College. Delany later founded the Brigidine Sisters in 1807, and the Patrician Brothers in 1808.

== Early life ==
He was born in 1747, the first of two sons, into a farming family on the Castlecoote Estate. His father Daniel and younger brother John died when Daniel was still young. Delany attended the local Hedge school at Briscula, just a few kilometres from his home. His mother, Elizabeth Delany (née Fitzpatrick) sent him to her sisters, who had a shop in the nearby town of Mountrath, to gain a better education.

As the public practice of Catholicism was outlawed by British Law at the time, in 1763, with the help of a good Protestant friend, the sixteen-year-old Delany was smuggled out of Ireland to Paris to study for the priesthood at the Irish College in Paris. He was ordained a priest around 1770. For the next five or six years Delany taught rhetoric at the English College at Saint-Omer in France.

Father Delany returned to Ireland in 1776 or 1777, disguised as a layman since priests were still outlawed. He was so appalled at the state of Ireland that he was tempted to return to France.

Soon after arriving, he was stationed at Tullow as assistant priest to Bishop James Keeffe. Catholic education in Ireland had been denied to the people of Ireland since the seventeenth century; in consequence, much of the population suffered from poverty, hunger and drunkenness. Delany tried to bring back the traditional Catholic education to the community. He started by the establishment of Sunday schools for the youth of Tullow. He also formed a youth band to help teach his students hymns. Soon older people in the community started to join these classes.

== Bishop ==
In April 1783, Delany was appointed Coadjutor to Bishop James Keeffe of the Diocese of Kildare and Leighlin, choosing as his motto Fortiter et Suaviter.

=== St. Patrick's College ===
With some relaxation of the Penal Laws in 1782, many Irish priests including Bishops Keeffe and Delany worked to rebuild churches, monasteries, convents and schools. In 1782 Keeffe and Delany began planning for the establishment of a tertiary college for the education of both lay students and those studying for the priesthood. St. Patrick's College was originally planned for Tullow but in the end, had to be situated in Carlow fifteen kilometres away. Keeffe died in 1787 but he was able to witness the beginning of construction. It was left to Bishop Delany and Fr Henry Staunton of Carlow to get the college finished. For financial reasons, it did not open until 1793, with Staunton as its first president. St. Patrick's, Carlow is the oldest surviving Catholic tertiary college in Ireland preceding St Patrick's College, Maynooth by two years.

In 1784, Delany organized a procession through Tullow for the Feast of Corpus Christi. He also decided to start ringing the Angelus bell, which hadn't been done for a century. This caused some consternation, with Bishop Keeffe, concerned it would lead to trouble. With the death of Bishop Keeffe in 1787 Bishop Delany was appointed Bishop of Kildare and Leighlin on 17 February 1788.

Sometime after 1794, his mother died, leaving him all her property. Delany invested a portion of this property left to him and the interest went to charities. Delany also distributed prayer books to children on the day of their first communion. He started a circulating library and was responsible for the building of a church in both Tullow (1805) and Mountrath (1810).

In 1807 Delany refounded the Congregation of St. Brigid, the Brigidine Sisters, and in 1808, the Congregation of The Brothers of St. Patrick in Tullow, County Carlow. In the convent gardens, Delany planted an oak sapling from Kildare. It is still there today. Today many of the Brigidine communities have an oak tree growing from the seed of an oak tree in Kildare.

Bishop Delany died at two in the morning on 9 July 1814. He had been seriously ill for some months and was being cared for by the Brigidine Sisters in their convent. He is buried in his Tullow church.

== Schools Named After Daniel Delany ==
- Bishop Delany Memorial School, Eldoret, Kenya.
- Delany College, Granville, NSW, Australia (a secondary school) is named after Daniel Delany.
- Delany Academy, Dormaa, Ghana, opened in 2008, is also named in honour of the Bishop.
- Holy Cross College, Ryde, New South Wales has a building named after Daniel Delany and the Delany Paddock, adjacent to its heritage-listed Fintan O'Neill building.
- There is a wing at Brigidine College, Randwick, NSW named after Daniel Delany.
- Delany Building at St Joseph's College, Echuca, Victoria, Australia.
- Delany House at Brigidine College, Indooroopilly, Brisbane, Australia.

The Delany Archive which holds the archives of the diocese of Kildare & Leighlin, the Patrician Brothers, Brigidine Sisters and Carlow College is located in Carlow College The Patrician Brothers in Sydney named the Delany Foundation after him.

== Sources ==
1. Kilbreda College, online, http://www.kilbreda.vic.edu.au, retrieved on 5 Feb 2007
2. Sr. Claude Carey, 1978, Brigidine and Patrician Post Primary School Year Book, Tullow
3. The Brigidine Sisters, online, http://www.brigidine.org.au, retrieved on 12 Feb 2007
4. An Education for All - The Story of a Bishop of Penal Ireland: Daniel Delany, 1747 - 1814, 2013, online, https://www.calameo.com/books/006718354d8ff31b6b11e
5. The Writings of Bishop Daniel Delany, 2019, online, https://www.calameo.com/read/006718354c2895600cf38
6. An Anthology of Writings on Bishop Daniel Delany, 2019, online, https://www.calameo.com/books/006718354d9a5f5a37a3b
7. Short Papers on Bishop Daniel Delany, 2019, online, https://en.calameo.com/books/006718354dbd6ced33513
8. Bishop Daniel Delany, Irish Dictionary of Biographies, online, https://www.dib.ie/biography/delany-daniel-a2509
9. The Man Bishop Daniel Delany, Mary O'Riordan CSB, online, https://www.calameo.com/read/006718354f6dd143ab9fe
