= Rory Stapleton =

Irish Gaelic footballer

Personal information
- Born: Ireland

Sport
- Sport: Gaelic football
- Position: Left corner back
Club
- Years: Club
- ? -?: Annanough
Inter-county
- Years: County
- ?- ?: Laois

Rory Stapleton is a Gaelic footballer from County Laois.

He usually plays at left corner back for Laois and in 2003 was part of the Laois team that won the All-Ireland Minor Football Championship title for the first time since 1997.

In 2006, Stapleton was part of the Laois team that won the Leinster U21 Football Championship. In 2011, he left his local team Annanough to join Dublin outfit St Vincents.

His first senior championship appearance for Laois came as substitute in 2008 and he started his first senior championship game against Louth at Parnell Park in the June 2009 quarter-final.
