= St Patrick's, Carlow College =

College in Carlow, Ireland

Carlow College, St. Patrick's
- Irish: Coláiste Phádraig Ceatharlach
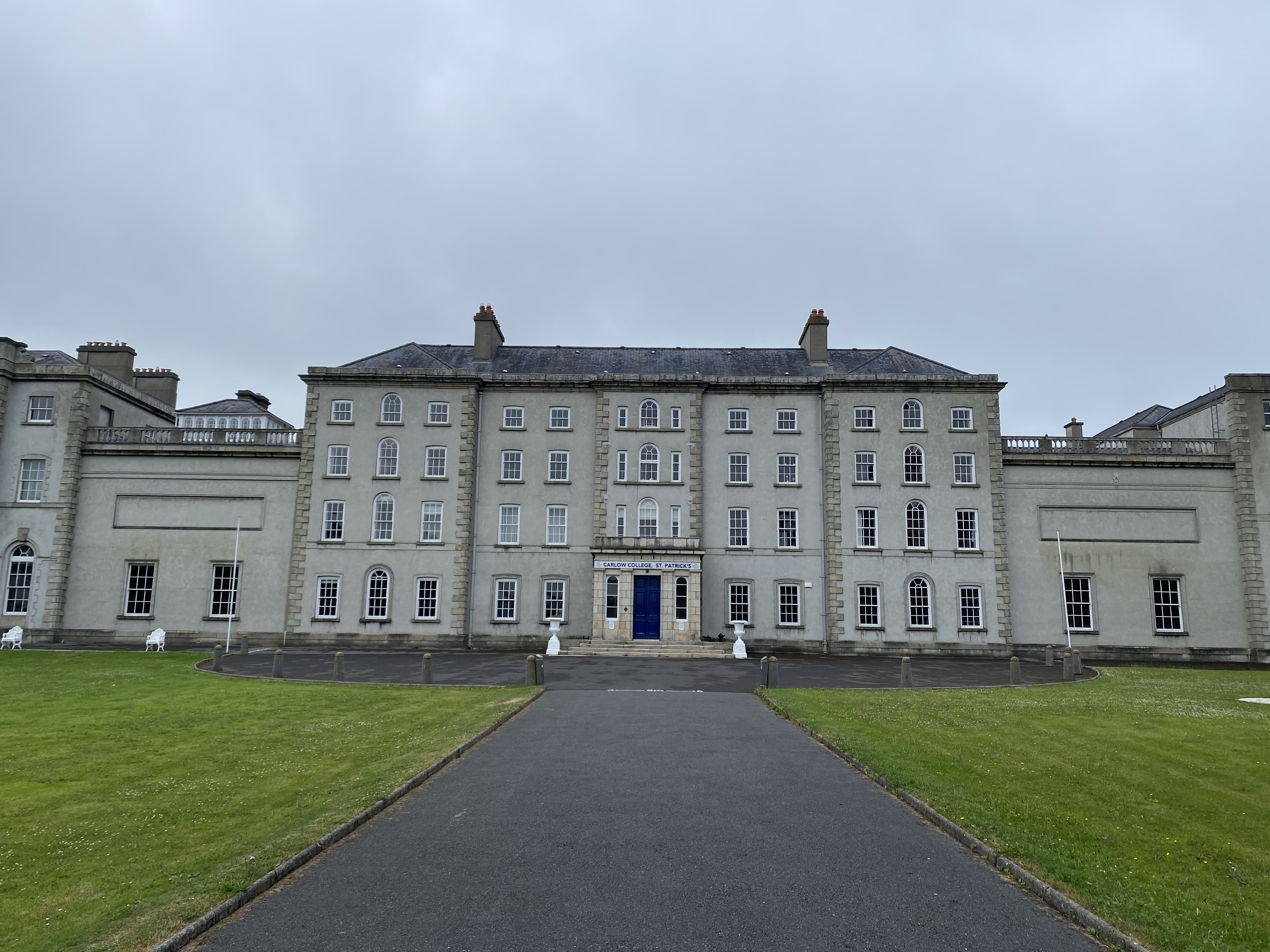
- Latin: Collegii Carloviensis
- Motto: Latin: Rescissa Vegetior Assurgit
- Motto in English: Pruned, it blossoms all the more
- Type: Roman Catholic
- Established: 1782; 244 years ago
- Affiliations: Quality and Qualifications Ireland (QQI) (since 2012); HETAC (1989–2012); University of London (1840–1892); Catholic University of Ireland (1879–1906)
- President: Fr Conn Ó Maoldhomhnaigh
- Location: Carlow Town; County Carlow, Carlow, Ireland; 52.8376°N 6.9270°W
- Nickname: Carlow College or "St Pat's"
- Website: carlowcollege.ie
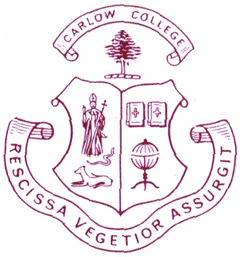

- Location in Ireland

St Patrick's, Carlow College, is a liberal arts college located in Carlow, Ireland. The college is the second oldest third level institution in Ireland and was founded in 1782 by James Keeffe, then Roman Catholic Bishop of Kildare and Leighlin, and his co-adjutor bishop Daniel Delany.

== History ==
Bishop Keeffe initially attempted to open a seminary in Tullow, but instead took out a 999-year lease on the present site. During the nineteenth century, students studied Philosophy, Theology, Mathematics, Languages and Law at Carlow College. It was founded in 1782. The delay in accepting students was due to resistance from the local Church of Ireland Bishop, but the passing of the Roman Catholic Relief Act 1793 obviated the need for his permission.

From 1793 to 1892, it educated both lay people and those studying for the priesthood. In 1832, college president Father Andrew Fitzgerald O.P. was imprisoned as part of the Tithe War for his refusal to pay tithes.

In 1840, Carlow College was accredited by the University of London and over the succeeding decades students of the college sat the examinations for primary degrees in Arts (B.A.) and Law (LL.B.) from London.

In May 1847, Carlow College president James Taylor purchased a house and farm of 127 acres at Knockbeg and St Mary's was opened there as a preparatory school to Carlow College. In 1892 lay students were transferred to Knockbeg. In 1866 Queen's University of Ireland engaged in a dialogue about empowering it to examine and confer degrees on students other than those of the Queen's colleges, the St. Patricks College Carlow Report was conducted and the college was deemed to meet the criteria, as evidenced by the courses examined and conferred by University of London (the report listed all the students and professors at the time), however it was never enacted. This dialogue with the president, James Walshe, and the Queen's senate caused a dispute between Walshe and Cardinal Cullen. Ordained students and staff at the college produced The Carlow College Magazine.

In 1844, the Foreign Missions Fund was established after a bequest from the Rev Maurice Kearney and sometimes called the Kearney Fund. This allowed bishops to foreign missions to adopt and students to avail of bursaries to help them.

Following the University Education (Ireland) Act 1879 all Catholic colleges, including Carlow College, came under a reconstituted Catholic University of Ireland, and affiliated to the new Royal University of Ireland. Hence students could be matriculated and examined by the Royal University.

The National Centre for Liturgy moved to Carlow in 1978 where it was based until it moved to Maynooth in August 1996.

From 1892 to 1989, the college was operating principally as a seminary for the priesthood. Between 1793 and 1993 it is estimated that 3132 priests were ordained in Carlow. In 1989 the college became affiliated to the NCEA, the forerunner of HETAC.

In 1993, a stone cross by the German artist Paul Schneider was placed in the grounds to celebrate its bicentenary. A lecture was also given by former college president Bishop Ryan.

In 1995, full-time degree students became entitled to the Irish government's free fees scheme and local authority grants.

=== Notable alumni ===
Distinguished among the thousands of its past students was one of the first-ever Catholic bishops to be appointed in the United States, John England; John Therry, Irish-Australian priest; Ireland's first cardinal, Paul Cullen; the artist Frank O'Meara; the Young Irelander and land-reform theorist, James Fintan Lalor, and Fenian John O'Leary. Daniel O'Connell, Ireland's predominant political leader in the first half of the nineteenth century, reputedly gave an oration to the Carlow townspeople from the top of the college's front porch. Descendants of O'Connell have studied and taught the college. Also educated in Carlow College was James Fintan Lalor's brother, Richard Lalor, Irish Nationalist MP for Queens County.

The Rev William Clancy (1802–1847), missionary and bishop in the United States and British Guiana, studied at Carlow.

The Jesuit and first president of UCD, the Rev William Delany, received his early education at Carlow.

Some of the 17 students who had been expelled from Maynooth due to their support for the 1798 rebellion had attended Carlow, including Francis Hearn, who was later executed.

The Rt Rev Michael Collins, Bishop of Cloyne, who was expelled from Maynooth due to his support for Robert Emmet's rebellion, completed his studies at Carlow.

The Rev Daniel William Cahill, an editor of the Dublin Telegraph, attended Carlow College; he returned in 1825 as Professor of Natural Philosophy at Carlow College, a post he held until 1834. Amongst his pupils were the aforementioned Lalor brothers. Cahill's nephew, Patrick Cahill, was also educated at Carlow College, obtaining an LLB from the University of London. He was a supporter of Irish Nationalism and Home Rule and later went on to found the Leinster Leader newspaper.

The nationalist Maurice Leyne and the physician and poet Richard D'Alton Williams (1822–1862) attended Carlow College. Poet and teacher William A. Byrne (William Dara) also attended Carlow.

Patrick Moriarty OSA was the second president of Villanova College and instrumental in its setting up, studied at Carlow before joining the Augustinians.

Patrick Barry, Bishop of St. Augustine, Florida, and co-founder of Barry University, began his studies for the priesthood at Carlow College in 1890.

British general Sir Thomas Kelly-Kenny (1840–1914) was also educated as a lay student at Carlow College.

Rev Thomas Nangle (1889–1972) from Canada, padre of the Royal Newfoundland Regiment in the first world war, studied for the priesthood at Carlow, later a Rhodesian farmer and MP.

Michael O'Hanrahan, who was executed for his part in the 1916 Easter Rising, was educated in Carlow College Academy.

Nationalist activist Kevin O'Higgins studied for a while at Carlow College, after he was expelled from Maynooth College in 1911 for smoking.

A number of the rooms in the college are named after alumni and people associated with the college such as Cobden Hall named after the architect Thomas Cobden who designed the college building, the John England Room and the Therry Room, among others.

Lawrence Duffy, current bishop of Clogher, studied in Carlow. Bishop elect of Achonry Paul Dempsey also studied in Carlow.

=== Notable professors ===
Among the first professors were French refugees following the revolution, Abbés Noget, Chabout and Labruné.

- Patrick J. (P.J.) Brophy (1919 – 1998) professor (1944-1974), president (1970–74)
- Thomas Croke, Archbishop of Cashel, GAA Patron, taught for a time at Carlow
- James Warren Doyle, O.E.S.A., Roman Catholic bishop of Kildare and Leighlin, campaigner for Catholic Emancipation, and the builder of Carlow Cathedral, held a professorship at Carlow College from 1814 to 1819. He was a professor of theology and was chair of rhetoric.

=== Sports ===
In 1865, Carlow College Cricket Club established and games played against other Carlow and Dublin teams. In 1882 Ecclesiastic students at Carlow College played rugby and Carlow College Rugby Club formed in 1898 they played in the Leinster Senior Cup, in 1912 rugby was reintroduced, as the Irish Nationalism increased Gaelic games became more prominent. In 1976 St. Patrick's College, Carlow defeated St Patrick's College, Thurles, to win the Higher Education Hurling League.

=== Presidents of the college ===
- Henry Staunton (1792–1814)
- Andrew Fitzgerald O.P. (1814–1843)
- James Ignatius Taylor (1843–1850)
- James Walshe (1850–1856) became bishop in Kildare and Leighlin.
- John Dunne (1856–1864) appointed Parish Priest of Kildare.
- James B. Kavanagh (1864–1880)
- Edward Burke (1880–1892)
- Patrick Foley (1892–1896) became bishop in Kildare and Leighlin
- John Foley (1896–1937), brother of Bishop Foley, was a professor at Carlow from 1886.
- Thomas Browne (1937–1941), parish priest in Portlaoise.
- James J. Conway V.G. (1941–1948), vice-president (1937–1941)
- Martin Brenan (1948–1956)
- Patrick Lennon, (1956–1966) he became Bishop in Kildare and Leighlin.
- Robert Prendergast (1966–1970)
- P. J. Brophy (1970–1974)
- Laurence Ryan (1974–1980), he later became Bishop of Kildare and Leighlin
- Matthew Kelly (1980–1986)
- John McDonald (1986–1994)
- Caoimhín(Kevin) Ó Néill (1994–2015)

p* Conn Ó Maoldhomhnaigh (2015–present), previously vice-president

== Present ==
In the 1990s the college transition from its primary role as a seminary and to became a college of the humanities. In 1996, the college began an NCEA Certificate and Diploma course in Social Care. Prior to the foundation of HETAC, a number of its courses were validated by its forerunner the National Council for Educational Awards (NCEA). Also about this time the college joined the Central Applications Office CAO for Irish school leavers applying for third-level education. On the 2011 CAO Carlow degrees in Citizenship and Community Studies, Humanities (Philosophy and Theology), English and History and Applied Social Studies in Social Care were offered. The Humanities degrees are recognised for teaching in secondary schools with further study.

Other postgraduate programmes included Higher Diploma in Business Studies in Parish Planning and Administration, Postgraduate Diploma in Equality and Diversity in the Workplace and Master of Arts in Therapeutic Child Care and qualify for tax relief.

In the 2006–07 academic year, the college opened a state-of-the-art library situated in the old college chapel. The library was named in memory of Fr Patrick Brophy, a former president who bequeathed his full library to the college. The new facility incorporated the Delany Archive containing the archives of the Brigidine Sisters, the Patrician Brothers as well as the college and diocese. It effectively charts 200 years of education in the local area. The P.J. Brophy memorial library stocks thousands of texts of the Humanities, in Philosophy, Theology, English Literature, Social Studies and the general Liberal Arts. The opening of the new library coincides with the opening of a new student services centre which is adjacent to the library. On 12 December 2006, the President of Ireland, Mary McAleese, officially opened the Fr P.J. Brophy Memorial Library and the Kathleen Brennan Student Services Centre where the Students Union offices are located.

In 2021 Carlow College, in association with IT Carlow and Carlow-Kilkenny Skillnet the part-time Level 8 Higher Diploma in Arts in Journalism and New Media Content commenced. A new Level 9 MA and Postgraduate Diploma in Regional Irish History, was launched in 2021.

Carlow College was successful in 2021 in joining the European, Erasmus Charter in Higher Education (ECHE).

In 2025, there is a student body of approximately 650 students, full and part-time, undergraduate and postgraduate, taking degrees in the humanities (in all fields of philosophy, theology and the liberal arts) and in the fields of social care.

A Graduation ceremony takes place each October with awards of Certificate, Diploma and Degrees being awarded. More recently an annual college ball has commenced.

Services and facilities at the college include lecture theatres, the P.J. Brophy Memorial Library, study facilities, IT facilities, canteen, students, online learning via moodle.

The Carlow College Literary Awards & Creative Writing Showcase, takes place each year to celebrate and showcase student achievement, with awards for students in each year.

=== Graduation ===
A graduation ceremony takes place each year and is attended by local figures from politics, education and business, as well as family and friends of the graduates. The 2011 graduation ceremony took place on 11 October, where graduates were conferred with their certificates, undergraduate and postgraduate degrees in attendance were representatives of HETAC, Cllr. Tom O'Neill, Cathaoirleach of Carlow Town Council, Pat Deering TD, along with other dignitaries.

At the 2013 graduation ceremony 255 students received their qualifications degrees in Applied Social Sciences, Humanities, English and History, Community Studies, and Masters in Therapeutic Childcare and an MA by Research, Bishop Denis Nulty attended the ceremony

The 2014 graduation took place in the college with 242 graduating, along with the conferring ceremony the colleges new Information and Training centre was opened on Tullow Street, by Deputy Ann Phelan TD.

The College awarded its inaugural St. Columbanus Medal in November 2018, to Dr Martin Mansergh, in recognition of his contribution to the Peace Process in Ireland. In December 2019 the papal nuncio Archbishop Okolo accepted the medal on behalf of Pope Francis.

=== Links with other institutions ===
In recent years, the college has established special links with Carlow University, Pittsburgh and with St. Ambrose University, in Davenport, Iowa. Other colleges which Carlow hosts study abroad programmes for University of West Florida (Irish Experience Programme), Mount Mercy University, Harper College, Kishwaukee College, and Parkland College in Illinois, through the Illinois Consortium for International Studies and Programs and Madison Area Technical College, Wisconsin these programmes would include excursions, Irish Literature and history courses.

In November 2007, Carlow College signed on an agreement with Trinity College, Dublin, which allowed for a new strategic collaborative partnership in the Humanities and Social Sciences between the two oldest colleges in Ireland. The partnership has led to the M.Ed. programme in Carlow which commenced in September 2012. This programme is no longer available.

Coinciding with this agreement, in 2008, Carlow College played host to a series of History lectures named Re-interpreting Rebellion in Irish History as part of the Michael Slattery lectures. These lectures featured appearances from history lecturers such as Prof. Ciaran Brady, Prof. Jane Ohlmeyer and Dr Michael O' Siochru.

The 2015 lecturer series included talks by David Dickson, David Ralph, David Ditchburn, Antje Roeder and Daniel Faas.

Other recent public lectures such as "The Legacy of Vision: John Henry Newman's Idea of a University" by Andrew Pierce (Trinity College) and "The Legacy of Vision: John Henry Newman's Idea of a University" by Patrica Casey (UCD/Mater Hospital).

=== Students' union ===
The students of the college are organized under Carlow College Students' Union (CCSU), the smallest affiliate member of the Union of Students' Ireland (USI).

CCSU formed in 2010 with aid from USI, electing its first president, Terry Behan, at the end of the 2009/10 academic year. While having always acted autonomously, CCSU did not gain formal autonomy until 2017 when its autonomy was added into the CCSU constitution by a referendum of its members and acknowledged by the college.

Past presidents of CCSU are as follows:

- Terry Behan 2010–2012
- Joeseph Farrelly 2012–2013
- Niamh Coffey 2013–2014
- Niall Torris 2014–2015
- Conor O'Leary 2015–2016
- Adam Clarke 2016–2018
- Amanda Bowes 2018–2019
- Adam Kane 2019–2020
- Brendan Mansfield 2020–2022
- Jacky Casserly 2022–2023
- Craig McLoughlin-Burke 2023-2024
- Alison Whelehan 2025-present

Carlow College Students' Union opened USI National Congress in 2018 with the outgoing President seeking a formal condemnation of the Rohingya Crisis in Myanmar by USI. The motion passed with no objection and USI continues to work with Amnesty International on the issue.

=== National Centre for Contemporary Art and George Bernard Shaw Theatre ===
In the grounds of Carlow College is the National Centre for Contemporary Art and the George Bernard Shaw Theatre, which officially opened in 2009. The college donated a significant portion of its grounds to Carlow County Council to aid the project. The opening of this centre coincides with a new entrance to the grounds of the college from the Old Dublin Road side of Carlow town.

=== Closure ===
In May 2026, it was announced that Carlow College would close. This would happen in a phased manner, with no new students from September 2026, and the college closing once the current 600 students have completed their courses in 2028. All 87 staff will be made redundant. South East Technological University (SETU) will take control of the campus. Carlow College has been withdrawn from the Central Applications Office for 2026. This was protested by students and staff in June 2026, calling for a merge with SETU to retain staff and current courses.

== Buildings on the college land ==
- St. Patrick's – main building of the college.
- P.J. Brophy Library – former Chapel of Sacred Heart.
- John England Room – Lecture hall named after famous former student.
- Therry Room – Lecture hall named after famous former student.
- Lennon House – student apartments.
- Cathedral of the Assumption of Blessed Virgin Mary, Carlow
- VISUAL Centre for Contemporary Art & The George Bernard Shaw Theatre
- Information and Training Centre (on Tullow Street)

The college is a keen supporter and participant in the annual Carlow Arts Festival, with the college buildings, the cathedral, visual centre and college grounds, used for hosting events, and for the festival. The 37th festival sees the festival HQ in a specially built pavilion on the college grounds.

== See also ==
- Institute of Technology, Carlow
- List of universities in the Republic of Ireland
