= James Warren Doyle =

Roman Catholic Bishop of Kildare and Leighlin (1786 – 1834)

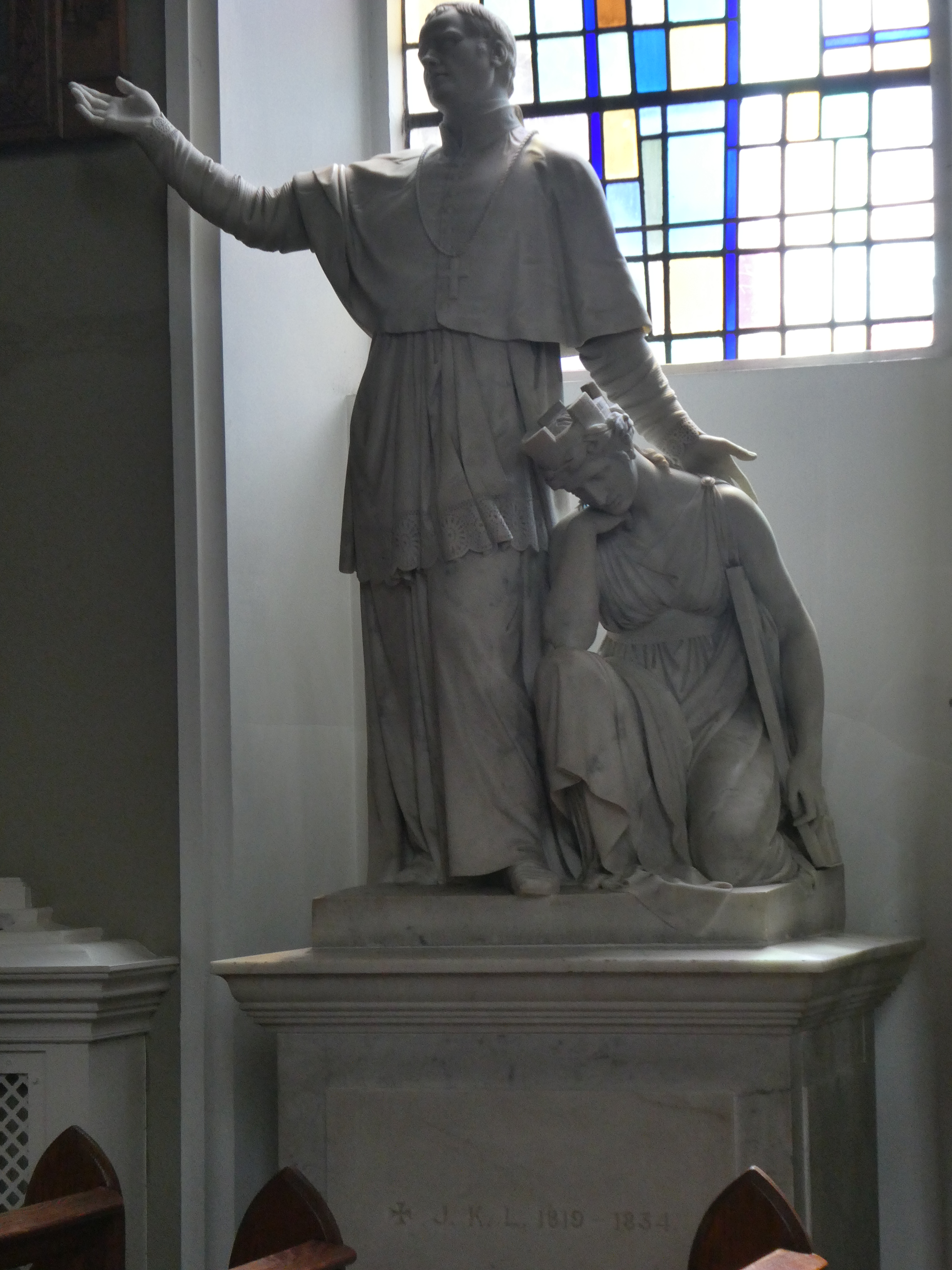
Statue of JKL in Carlow Cathedral, encouraging Hibernia to stand.

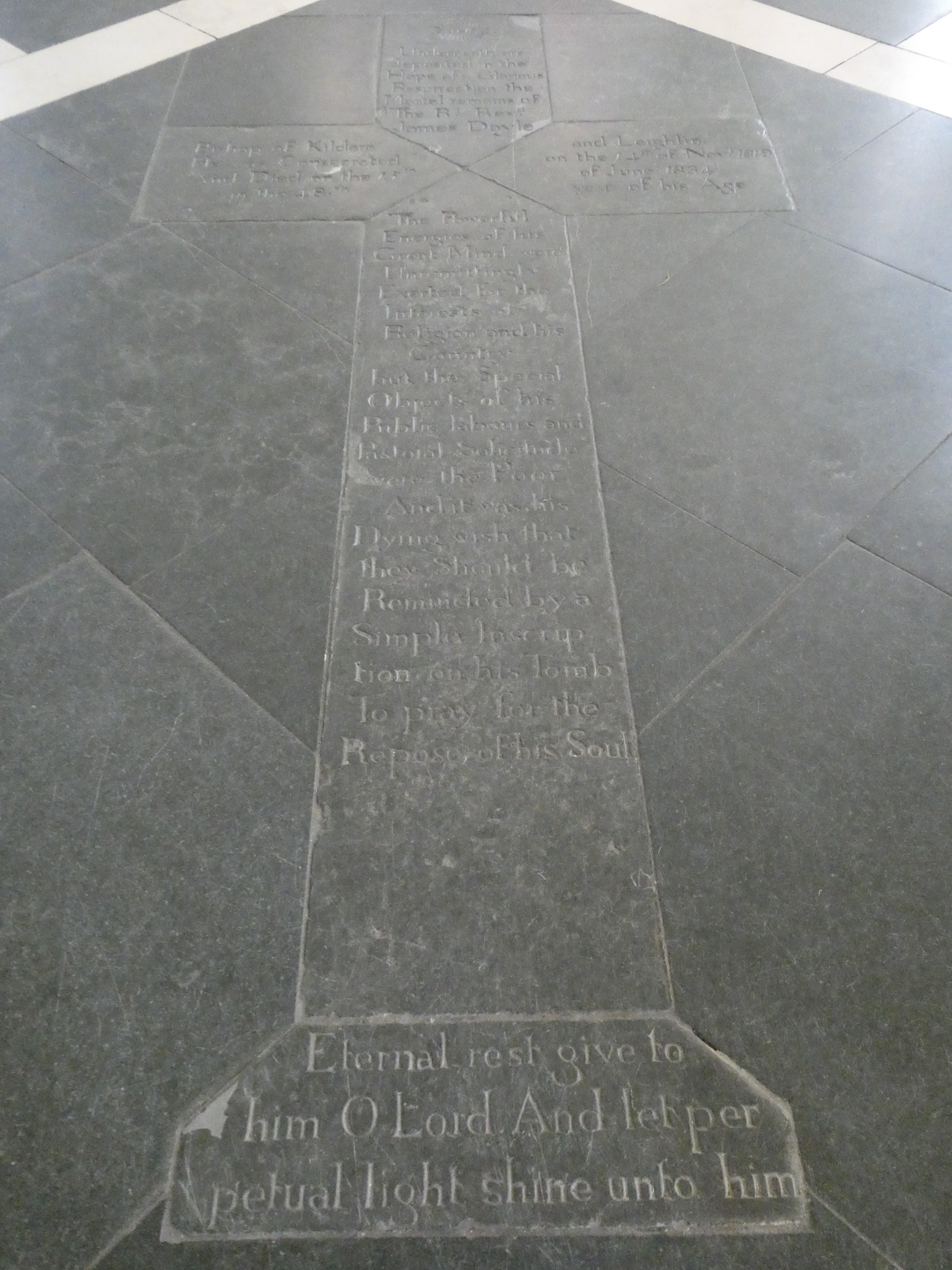
JKL's tomb in Carlow Cathedral

James Warren Doyle, OESA (1786–1834) was a Roman Catholic Bishop of Kildare and Leighlin in Ireland, who used the signature "JKL", an acronym from "James Kildare and Leighlin." Doyle was active in the Anti-Tithe movement. A campaigner for Catholic Emancipation until it was attained in 1829, he was also an educator, church organiser and the builder of Carlow cathedral.

== Early life ==
Doyle was born close to New Ross, County Wexford in 1786, the posthumous son of a respectable Catholic farmer, James Doyle; his mother (Anne Warren, of Quaker extraction) was living in poverty at the time of his birth. At the age of eleven he witnessed the horrors of the Battle of New Ross between the United Irishmen and British Crown forces supplemented by the militia and yeomanry.

He received his early education at Clonleigh, at Rathconrogue at the school of a Mr. Grace, and later at the Augustinian College, New Ross under the care of an Augustinian friar, John Crane.

Doyle joined the Augustinian friars in 1805 at Grantstown, County Wexford and then studied for his doctorate at Coimbra in Portugal (1806–08). His studies were disturbed by the Peninsular War, during which he served as a sentry in Coimbra. Later, he accompanied the British Army with Wellington's forces to Lisbon as an interpreter.

Following Doyle's return to Ireland, he was ordained to the priesthood on 1 October 1809, at Enniscorthy. He taught logic at the Augustinian College, New Ross. In 1813, Doyle was appointed to a professorship at Carlow College, holding the Chair of Rhetoric and in 1814, the Professorship of Theology.

== Bishop 1819–1834 ==
Michael Corcoran, Bishop of Kildare and Leighlin, died on 22 February 1819. Doyle was a popular choice of the clergy and bishops of the Archdiocese of Dublin and was chosen by the Holy See as Corcoran's successor. He was formally named in August 1819 and was duly consecrated in Carlow Parish Church on 14 November. During his fifteen-year tenure as Bishop of Kildare and Leighlin, Doyle earned respect nationwide for his polemics in furtherance of the Catholic position in both Irish and British society, and in supporting the work of the Catholic Association. His books on pastoral, political, educational and inter-denominational matters provide a rich source of material for social and religious historians (see below). He was a close ally of Daniel O'Connell in the political campaign for Catholic Emancipation which was finally passed in 1829 by the Wellington government.

=== Bible War ===
Doyle's elevation to the episcopate coincided with the initiation of the so-called Bible War by Protestant church "home missions". In 1826, evangelicals proclaimed the beginning of the “Second Reformation” that would soon bring the country's Catholic majority within the Protestant fold.

In 1827, Doyle engaged the liberal lawyer (and secularist) George Ensor to investigate reports of hundreds of conversions to Protestantism on the estate in Cavan of proselytising Orangeman, Lord Farnham. Ensor's reports assured the bishop that, such as they were, the conversions were a case of "souperism"and would not survive the then near-famine conditions. These Ensor followed up with Letters showing the inutility, and exhibiting the absurdity, of what is rather fantastically termed "the new Reformation" (1828). This was a broadside against the new evangelicalism and its requirement that "the Bible without note or comment to be a schoolbook," a demand by Protestant church leaders that upended the government plans, Doyle broadly supported, for non-denominational primary education.

=== Tithe War ===
In 1830, the new tithe-proctor of Graigue (a parish of 4,779 Catholics and 63 Protestants) decided to break with the tradition of his predecessor and to enforce seizure orders for the collection of arrears of Tithes. Tithes provided financial support of the established Anglican Church of Ireland. Some of the recalcitrant Catholics had habitually transferred ownership of their livestock to Doyle in order to avoid seizure at the town fair. The new proctor requested their priest's cooperation in handing over the assets. Doyle refused, and the proctor, aided by the Irish Constabulary, seized some of the livestock. A mass riot broke out at the fair and there were several casualties. A civil disobedience campaign followed, peppered with sporadic violence mostly at country fairs over the seizure of livestock. A period of instability that would become known as the Tithe War followed.

Doyle was a leader of nonviolent resistance to the Tithe, devoting himself both to strengthening the nonviolent resistance and to discouraging like paramilitary secret societies who had taken to using violence to drive out tithe-collectors and to intimidate collaborators. He said: "I maintain the right which [Irish Catholics] have of withholding, in a manner consistent with the law and their duty as subjects, the payment of tithe in kind or in money until it is extorted from them by the operation of the law."

The ministers of the Church of Ireland, Doyle concluded, are

taking the blanket from the bed of sickness, the ragged apparel from the limbs of the pauper, and selling it by auction for the payment of tithe. But in your opposition to this pest of agriculture and bane of religion, keep always before your eyes a salutary dread of those statutes which guard the tithe. Let no violence or combination to inspire dread be ever found in your proceedings. Justice has no need of such allies. In these countries, if you only obey the law and reverence the constitution, they both will furnish you with ample means whereby to overthrow all oppression, and will secure to you the full enjoyment of every social right.

On another occasion he said:

The advocacy of truth will always excite hostility, and he who enforces justice will ever have to combat against the powers of this world. I have, through life, regardless of danger or injury, sought to maintain the cause of truth and justice against those "who seek after a lie" and "oppress the weak." We, who are now embarked in this cause, have to renew our determination, and in proportion as power is exerted against us to oppose ourselves to it as a wall of brass. Let us receive but not return its shocks; for if we abide by the law and pursue truth and justice we may suffer loss for a moment, but as certainly as Providence presides over human affairs every arm lifted against us shall not prosper, and against every tongue that contendeth with us we will obtain our cause. Peace, unanimity, and perseverance are, therefore, alone requisite, under the Divine protection, to annihilate the iniquitous tithe system, to lift up the poor from their state of extreme indigence, and consequent immorality, and to prepare the way for the future happiness of our beloved country.

Doyle was invited to give evidence on the state of Ireland to parliamentary enquiries in London in 1825, 1830 and 1832. Asked at one such inquiry to explain his urging his countrymen to resist the tithes, and why he should not feel himself responsible for the violence that accompanied the Tithe War, he replied:

[N]o man ought to be condemned for exhorting people to pursue justice in a certain line, though he may foresee that in the pursuit of that justice the opposition given to those who are proceeding in a just course may produce collision, and that collision lead to the commission of crime; but our duty, as I conceive, is to seek for the injustice, and there to impute the crime… It is to that injustice, and not to those who pursue a just course for the attainment of a right end, that the guilt is to be ascribed.

Seeing his readiness and resource, the Duke of Wellington remarked that Doyle examined the committee rather than was examined by them.

=== Support for non-denominational primary education ===
Given Doyle's prior experience in education, his major contribution was arguably in helping the establishment of National Schools across Ireland from 1831, the initiative of Edward Stanley, Chief Secretary of Ireland, which were initially started with a U.K. government grant of £30,000. The proposed system was ahead of state provision for education in England or Scotland at that time. This Model School prototype was, in some respects, experimental. His involvement is a sign of his practicality and foresight. He told his priests:

…all the teachers henceforth to be employed be provided from some Model School, with a certificate of their competency, that will aid us in a work of great difficulty, to wit, that of suppressing hedge schools, and placing youths under the direction of competent teachers, and of those only.

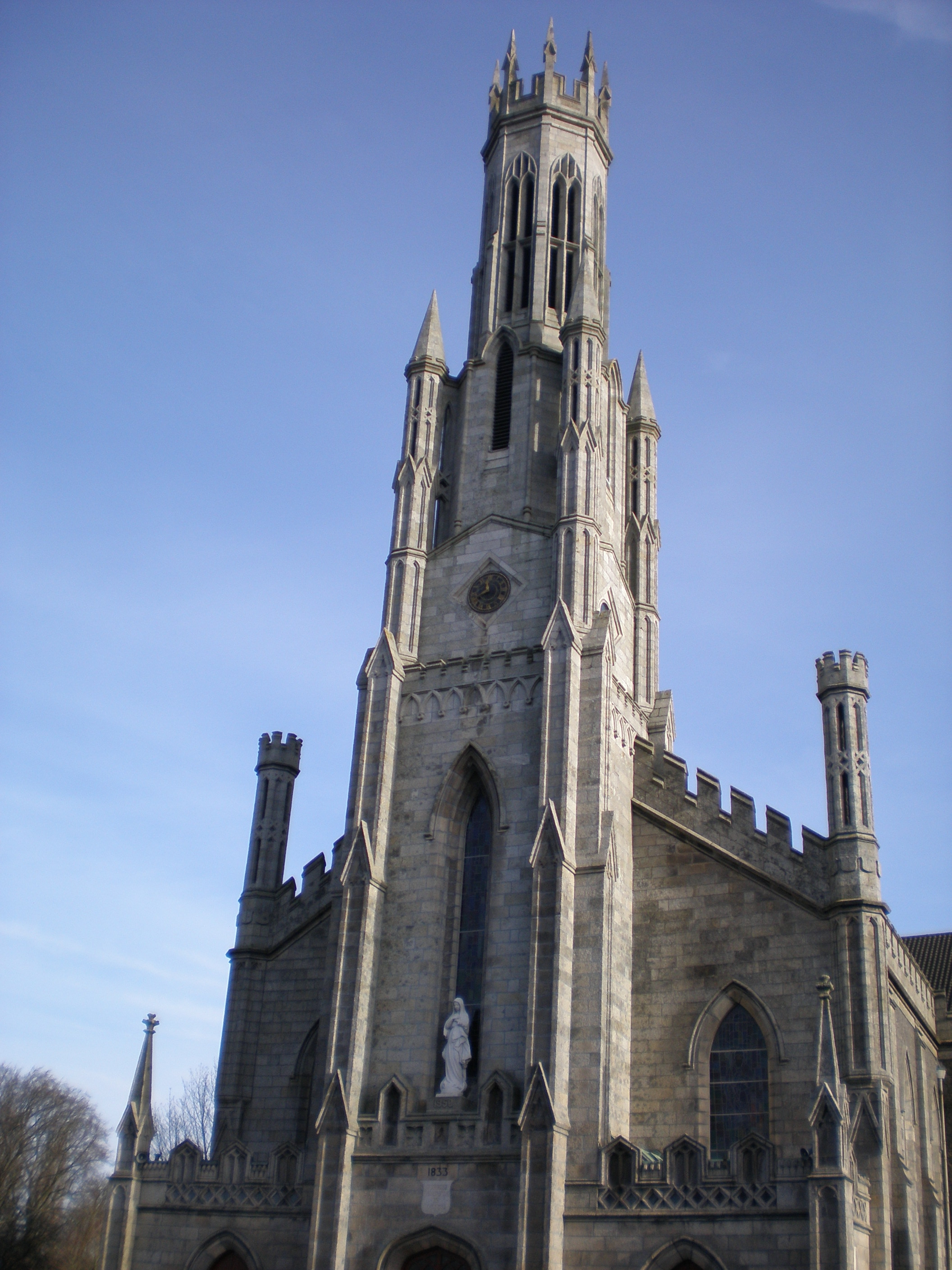
Carlow Cathedral

Doyle spoke before a Parliamentary Committee as follows:

I do not see how any man wishing well to the public peace, and who looks to Ireland as his country, can think that peace can be permanently established, or the prosperity of the country ever well secured, if children are separated at the commencement of life on account of their religious opinions.

This is how he sees it from a political point of view. Separate schools would endanger the public peace, which is not yet permanent. The prosperity of the country also depends on keeping children together. Then he deals with the effect of separation on the children themselves.

I do not know of any measures that would prepare the way for better feeling in Ireland than uniting children at an early age, and bringing them up in the same school, leading them to commune with one another and to form those little intimacies and friendships which subsist through life. Children thus united know and love each other as children brought up together always will and to separate them is I think, to destroy some of the finest feelings in the hearts of men.

Doyle made statements on other issues: the theological status of 'non-Catholic' Christians; freedom to convert to Protestantism, mixed marriages and, as already mentioned, on the union of Catholics and Anglicans. We know now that on this last issue he was asked to resign by Rome and was eventually allowed to continue after agreeing not to speak on the issue again.

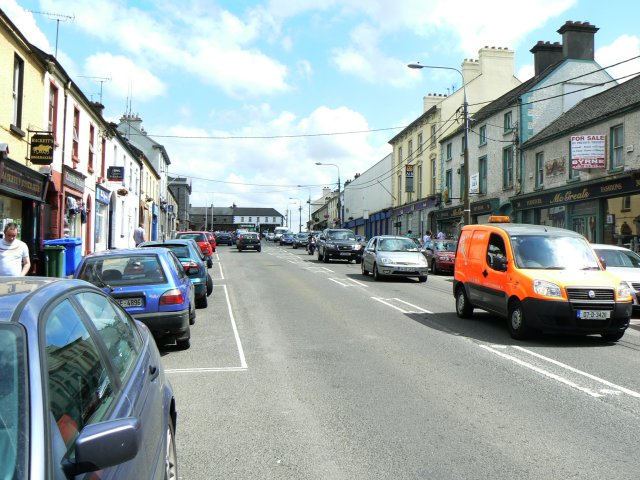
JKL Street, Edenderry, named for James Warren Doyle

The construction of Carlow Cathedral of the Assumption crowned Doyle's career, being started in 1828 and finished at the end of November 1833. Doyle fell ill for a number of months before dying on 15 June 1834. He was buried in his new cathedral. A sculpture, by John Hogan, in memorial to Doyle was finished in 1839.

Several biographies were written on Doyle before 1900 and his influence on the later Irish Catholic bishops in the period 1834-1900 was considerable. He had proved that negotiations with government could be beneficial to his church, his congregation, and its finances.

JKL Street in Edenderry, County Offaly is named for Doyle (per his signature, an acronym of James Kildare and Leighlin).

== Works ==
- A Vindication of the religious and civil principles of the Irish Catholics (1823)
- Letter on the state of Ireland (1825)
- An essay on the Catholics claims (1826)
- Letter to Thomas Spring Rice, Esq. M.P. &c: on the establishment of a legal provision for the Irish poor, and on the nature and destination of church property (1831)

== See also ==
- Cardinal Newman
- Cardinal Cullen
