= Roman Catholic Diocese of Kildare and Leighlin =

Diocese of the Catholic Church

Coordinates: 52°49′50.16″N 6°55′54.12″W

Diocese of Kildare and Leighlin Dioecesis Kildarensis et Leighlinensis Deoise Chill Dara agus Leithghlinne

Catholic
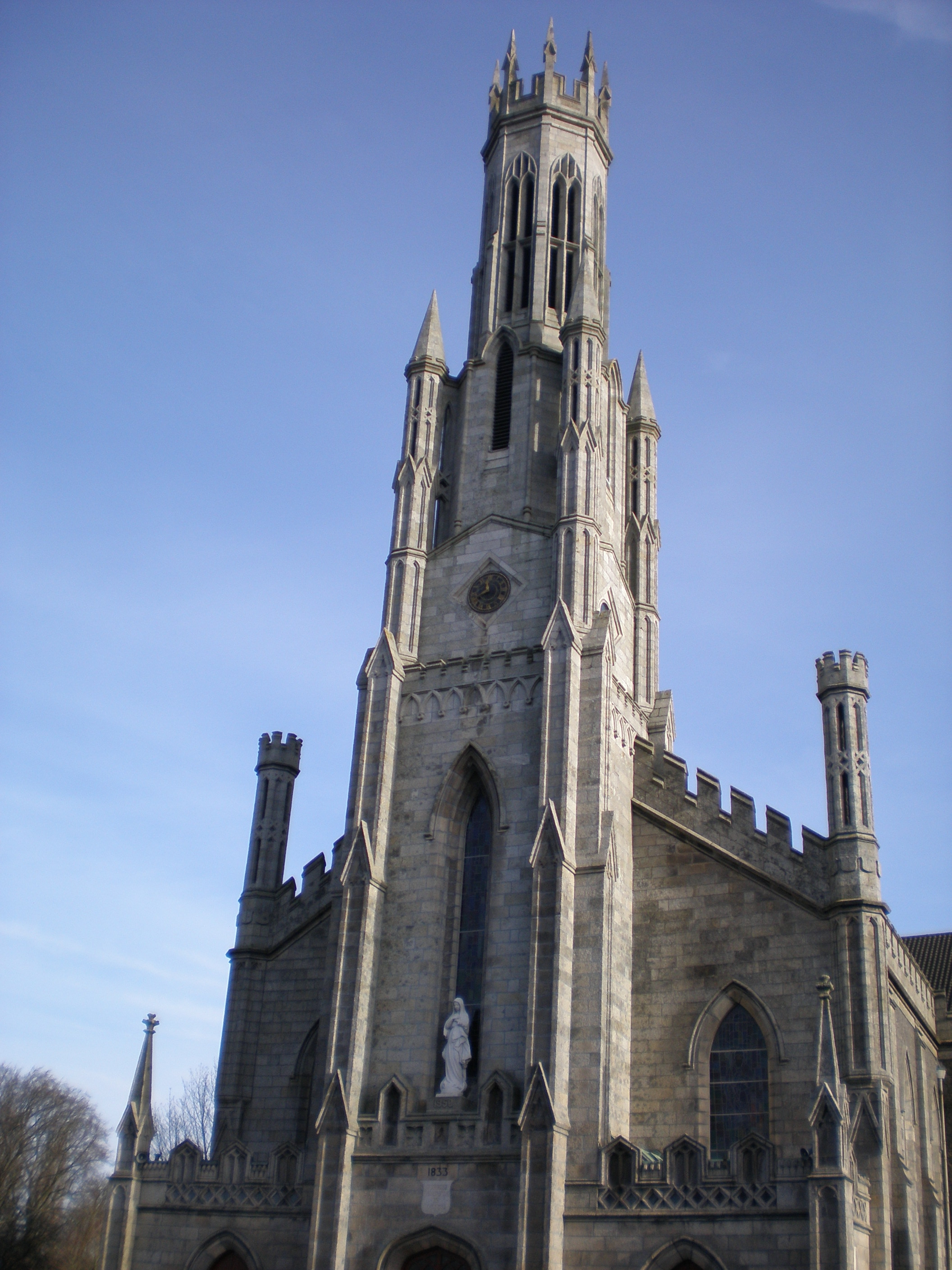
- Cathedral of the Assumption, Carlow.

Location
- Country: Ireland
- Territory: County Carlow, parts of counties Kildare, Laois, Offaly, Kilkenny, Wicklow and Wexford
- Ecclesiastical province: Province of Dublin
- Metropolitan: Archdiocese of Dublin

Statistics
- Area: 1,608 sq mi (4,160 km^{2})
- Population: Total; Catholics: (as of 2019); 286,360; 262,250 (91.6%)

Information
- Denomination: Catholic
- Sui iuris church: Latin Church
- Rite: Roman Rite
- Established: United 29 November 1694
- Cathedral: Cathedral of the Assumption, Carlow
- Patron saint: Kildare: St Brigid and St Conleth; Leighlin: St Lazerian

Current leadership
- Pope: Leo XIV
- Bishop: Denis Nulty; Bishop of Kildare and Leighlin
- Metropolitan Archbishop: Dermot Pius Farrell, Archbishop of Dublin

Map
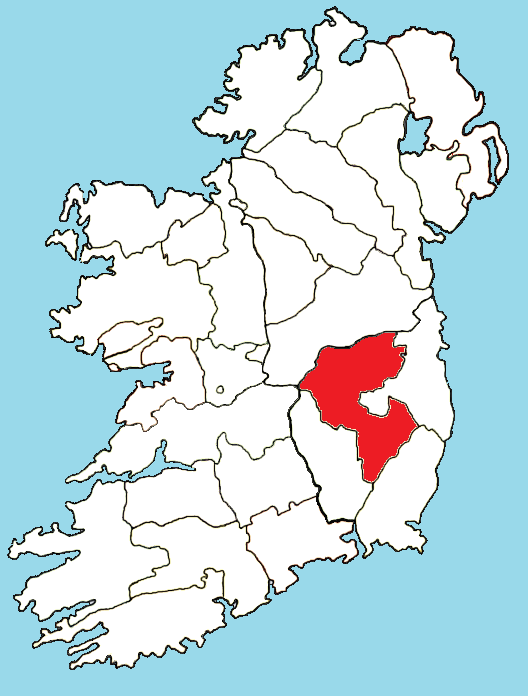

Website
- kandle.ie

The Diocese of Kildare and Leighlin (/ˈlɔːxlɪn/; Latin: Dioecesis Kildarensis et Leighlinensis; Irish: Deoise Chill Dara agus Leithghlinn) is a Latin Church diocese of the Catholic Church in eastern Ireland. It is one of three suffragan dioceses in the ecclesiastical province of Dublin and is subject to the Archdiocese of Dublin. On 7 May 2013, Denis Nulty was appointed bishop of the diocese.

== Geographic remit ==
The united diocese includes virtually all of County Carlow, most of County Kildare and parts of counties Offaly, Laois, Kilkenny, Wexford and Wicklow. The largest towns in the diocese are Carlow, Edenderry, Kildare, Naas, Newbridge, Portarlington and Portlaoise.

== History ==
These two dioceses continued to be separate from their foundation until 1678, when, owing to the extreme tenuity of the episcopal revenues, the bishopric of Leighlin was given in commendam by the Holy See to the Bishop of Kildare. The Cathedral Church of the Assumption of the Blessed Virgin Mary is located in the town of Carlow.

Today, with the help of enthusiastic lay people, the diocese is actively engaged in nurturing the faith of local youth. A key example of this is its involvement in the John Paul II Awards. The award was launched by the Papal Nuncio to Ireland, Giuseppe Lazzarotto on 7 November 2006 in the Diocese of Derry, Northern Ireland. It is dedicated to Pope John Paul II due to the strong beliefs and confidence he had in the youth of the world today.

== Deaneries and parishes ==
The united Diocese of Kildare and Leighlin is divided into seven deaneries, each divided into a number of parishes or group parishes.

Diocese	Deanery	Parishes or Group Parishes
Diocese of Kildare and Leighlin	Deanery of Borris	Borris; Graignamanagh; Leighlin; Bagenalstown; Myshall; Paulstown; St. Mullin's
Diocese of Kildare and Leighlin	Deanery of Carlow	Arless; Askea; Bennekerry; Carlow Cathedral; Doonane; Graiguecullen; Tinryland
Diocese of Kildare and Leighlin	Deanery of Kildare	Allen; Balyna; Carbury; Curragh Camp; Kildare; Monasterevin; Rathangan; Suncroft
Diocese of Kildare and Leighlin	Deanery of Naas	Caragh; Clane; Cooleragh & Staplestown; Kilcock; Kill; Naas; Newbridge; Sallins; Two Mile House
Diocese of Kildare and Leighlin	Deanery of Portarlington	Clonaslee; Clonbullogue; Daingean; Edenderry; Emo; Killeigh; Mountmellick; Portarlington; Rhode; Rosenallis
Diocese of Kildare and Leighlin	Deanery of Portlaoise	Abbeyleix; Ballinakill; Ballyadams; Ballyfin; Mountrath; Portlaoise; Raheen; Stradbally
Diocese of Kildare and Leighlin	Deanery of Tullow	Ballon; Baltinglass; Clonegal; Clonmore; Rathvilly; Hacketstown; Tullow

== Ordinaries ==
The following is a basic list of the Bishops of Kildare and Leighlin.

- Edward Nolan (1834–1837)
- Francis Haly (1838–1855)
- James Walshe (1856–1888)
- James Lynch (1888–1896)
- Patrick Foley (1897–1926)
- Matthew Cullen (1927–1936)
- Thomas Keogh (1936–1967)
- Patrick Lennon (1967–1987)
- Laurence Ryan (1987–2002)
- James Moriarty (2002–2010)
- Denis Nulty (2013–present)

== See also ==
- Catholic Church in Ireland
- Bishop of Leighlin
- Old Leighlin
- Diocese of Meath and Kildare (Church of Ireland)
