= List of Irish county nicknames =

This is a list of nicknames for the traditional counties of Ireland and their inhabitants. The nicknames are mainly used with reference to the county's representative team in gaelic games organised by the Gaelic Athletic Association (GAA). A few of the names are quite old and well-known; most are recent coinages mainly used by journalists. Some refer specifically to the Gaelic games county colours.

Many counties have multiple nicknames – for example, Kildare may be called "the short grass county" or "the thoroughbred county" – while some counties have separate nicknames for the county and people: for example Wexford is often called the Model county, and Wexford people are called "yellowbellies". A few nicknames are shared: any Connacht county playing a team from elsewhere may be dubbed "the Westerners"; London GAA or New York GAA may be called "the Exiles"; Westmeath, Fermanagh, and Cavan have each been called "the Lake county".

== List ==
County (GAA link)	Nickname	Origins and notes
Antrim (GAA)	The Glensmen	From the Glens of Antrim
Antrim (GAA)	The Saffrons	From the county colours
Armagh (GAA)	The Orchard County	The rich fruit growing country to the north-east of the city of Armagh is known as the "Orchard of Ireland". (The local electoral district in that part of Armagh is called "The Orchard".))
Armagh (GAA)	The Cathedral County	The Primates of All Ireland's seats (both Church of Ireland and Roman Catholic) are in the city of Armagh
Carlow (GAA)	The Dolmen County	Brownshill Dolmen is near Carlow town
Carlow (GAA)	The Barrowsiders	River Barrow
Carlow (GAA)	The Fighting Cocks	Carlow was famous for cock fighting in the early nineteenth century. "The Fighting Cocks" is also a crossroads on the N80 road which names a district between Tullow and Nurney and its GAA club
Carlow (GAA)	The Scallion Eaters	In the early nineteenth century, most of the onions sold in Leinster were grown near Carlow town
Cavan (GAA)	The Breffni	Mediaeval Kingdom of Breifne, centred on Cavan
Cavan (GAA)	The Lake County	Lakes include Loughs Gowna, Oughter, Ramor, and Sheelin
Clare (GAA)	The Banner County	Either the banners captured by Clare's Dragoons at the Battle of Ramillies; or the banner of "Catholic emancipation" raised by Daniel O'Connell's victory in the 1828 County Clare by-election that led to the Roman Catholic Relief Act 1829.
Cork (GAA)	The Rebel County	Originally from Cork city's support for pretender Perkin Warbeck in 1495; reinforced by Cork's prominence in the Irish War of Independence (1919–21) and the Irish Civil War (1922–23) In 2011, Cork GAA's youth development section was rebranded as "Rebel Óg" (Irish óg = "young").
Cork (GAA)	The Leesiders	River Lee
Cork (GAA)	The Donkey Aters (Eaters)	Applied in particular to the vicinity of Skibbereen in west Cork, where people resorted to eating donkeys during the Great Famine
Donegal (GAA)	The Hills	The Derryveagh Mountains and Bluestack Mountains are called The Hills of Donegal in many folk songs
Donegal (GAA)	Tír Chonaill or Tyrconnell	Mediaeval kingdom, often used in place of the official Dún na nGall as the Irish name for the county
Donegal (GAA)	The O'Donnell County	Mediaeval lords
Donegal (GAA)	The Herring Gutters	The fishing industry is important, especially in Killybegs
Donegal (GAA)	The Forgotten County	Donegal is almost cut off from the rest of the Republic of Ireland by Northern Ireland
Down (GAA)	The Mourne County; The Mournemen	Mourne Mountains. In GAA contexts, "Mournemen" is often applied specifically to the football rather than the hurling team; though not always
Down (GAA)	The Ardsmen	Applied specifically to the hurling team. From the Ards peninsula, stronghold of hurling in the county
Dublin (GAA)	The Dubs	Clipped form of "Dubliners"
Dublin (GAA)	The Liffeysiders	River Liffey
Dublin (GAA)	The Jackeens	Pejorative term for Dubliners; contrasted with culchies
Dublin (GAA)	The Jacks	Reclaimed version of Jackeen
Dublin (GAA)	The Metropolitans	Dublin city is the metropolis, i.e. the capital city
Dublin (GAA)	The Pale	The Pale was the region around Dublin subject to English control in the 14th and 15th centuries
Dublin (GAA)	The Big Smoke	A reference to severe smog problems that endured until the late 1980s
Fermanagh (GAA)	The Maguire County	Mediaeval lords (cf. Baron Maguire from the 17th century)
Fermanagh (GAA)	The Lakeland County; the Lake County	Lough Erne dominates the topography
Fermanagh (GAA)	The Erne County; the Ernesiders	River Erne and Lough Erne
Galway (GAA)	The Tribesmen	Galway city is "the city of the tribes", those being fourteen historically prominent families
Galway (GAA)	The Herring Chokers	The fishing industry
Kerry (GAA)	The Kingdom	John Philpot Curran, MP, magistrate, and wit, said in the Irish House of Commons on 23 January 1787: "The low and contemptible state of your magistracy is the cause of much evil, particularly in the Kingdom of Kerry. I say Kingdom, for it seems absolutely not a part of the same country"
Kildare (GAA)	The Lilywhites	From the county colours
Kildare (GAA)	The Short Grass County	The open pastureland of the Curragh. Attested from at least 1897
Kildare (GAA)	The Thoroughbred County	Centre for breeding and training of racehorses. A marketing slogan, introduced in November 1999
Kilkenny (GAA)	The Cats	Kilkenny cats are proverbially tenacious fighters
Kilkenny (GAA)	The Marble County	Kilkenny city was "the Marble City" because of the nearby quarry of Kilkenny marble (actually limestone) featured in its buildings and pavements.
Kilkenny (GAA)	The Noresiders	River Nore
Kilkenny (GAA)	Wet-the-guns	Dates back to the 1798 Rebellion: rebels from Castlecomer, County Kilkenny, were mocked for allowing their gunpowder to get wet (and thus useless) prior to the Battle of Kilcumney.
Laois (GAA)	The O'Moore County	Mediaeval lords (cf. Rory O'Moore in the 17th century)
Laois (GAA)	"Poor and proud"	Disused.
Leitrim (GAA)	"Lovely Leitrim"	From the song "Lovely Leitrim", written in by Phil Fitzpatrick, an NYPD member from Mohill killed in 1947. It was a 1966 Number One single for Larry Cunningham. Another "Lovely Leitrim" was written in Chicago in 1956 by Jim Donnelly of Cloone and Tom Masterson of Carrigallen
Leitrim (GAA)	The Ridge County	Leitrim town's name is anglicised from the Irish Liath Druim, "grey ridge"; Carrick-on-Shannon is Cora Droma Ruisc – "the weir of the marshy ridge". The method of growing potatoes in ridges separated by ditches was especially common in Leitrim
Leitrim (GAA)	The Wild Rose County	The Wild Rose of Lough Gill, an 1883 historical romance by Patrick G. Smyth set largely in North Leitrim. Wild roses grow profusely in northwest Leitrim
Leitrim (GAA)	The O'Rourke County	Mediaeval lords of western Breifne
Limerick (GAA)	The Shannonsiders	The River Shannon, Limerick is the principal city on the longest river in Ireland
Limerick (GAA)	The Treaty County	Limerick city is "the Treaty city" after the Treaty of Limerick in 1691. Treaty United F.C. was founded in the city in 2020.
Limerick (GAA)	buttermilks	
Londonderry (Derry GAA) (Note: See Derry/Londonderry name dispute; the GAA uses "Derry".)	The Oak-leaf County	From the leaf on the crest of Derry GAA; Derry is an anglicisation of Irish language Doire "oak-grove"
Longford (GAA)	Annaly, Land of Annaly	The county is roughly coterminous with the ancient kingdom of Annaly (Anghaile).
Longford (GAA)	The Slashers	Longford Slashers is a GAA club in Longford town. "Slasher" in the sense "man of valour" comes from Myles 'the Slasher' O'Reilly, killed defending the bridge of Finnea in 1646 during the Irish Confederate Wars. "Slasher" became a pejorative for Longford people, notably former Taoiseach Albert Reynolds, with a sense akin to culchie. Still more recently it has been reclaimed by the locals
Longford (GAA)	The O'Farrell County	Medieval O'Farrell family
Louth (GAA)	The Wee County	The smallest county in Ireland
Mayo (GAA)	The Yew County	The name Mayo is anglicised from the Irish Maigh Eo, "plain of the yew", the site of a mediaeval abbey
Mayo (GAA)	The Heather County	Heather is common in western Mayo
Mayo (GAA)	The Maritime County	The longest Atlantic coastline
Mayo (GAA)	"Mayo, God help us!"	Mayo was the county worst affected by the Great Famine
Mayo (GAA)	"The Green above the Red"	From the county colours (green shoulders, red breast); themselves inspired by "The Green Above The Red", a rebel song to the tune of "Irish Molly O" with lyrics by Thomas Osborne Davis: Full often when our fathers saw the Red above the Green, They rose in rude but fierce array, with sabre, pike and skian, And over many a noble town, and many a field of dead, They proudly set the Irish Green above the English Red
Meath (GAA)	The Royal county	The Hill of Tara, seat of the legendary High Kings of Ireland, is in Meath
Monaghan (GAA)	The Farney	Mediaeval territory of Farney, later the Barony of Farney in south County Monaghan. A 2004 article suggests the nickname dates from the prominence of Farneymen in the early years of Monaghan GAA.
Monaghan (GAA)	The Oriel County	Airgíalla, anglicised Oriel, a medieval kingdom with territory overlapping the modern county; north Monaghan people prefer the nickname "Oriel" to "Farney".
Monaghan (GAA)	The Drumlin County	Drumlin fields dominate the local topography
Offaly (GAA)	The Faithful County	In 1953, Andy Croke wrote, 'If ever Offaly earns a name like "Rebel" Cork or "Premier" Tipperary, I believe it will be the "Faithful" County, for nowhere else are hurlers and football more intent on sticking to their colours, which incidentally are green, white and gold.' Also attributed to Martin O'Neill (Leinster GAA secretary 1927–69) and Bob O'Keeffe (GAA president from 1935–38). Possibly because the county is strong in both hurling and gaelic football. The motto on the 1983 county coat of arms is Esto Fidelis "Be You Faithful"
Offaly (GAA)	The Biffos	Acronym for "Big ignorant fucker from Offaly".
Roscommon (GAA)	The Rossies	
Roscommon (GAA)	The Sheepstealers	A common cause of transportation to Australia, the crime was common in Roscommon as it was easy to cross the River Shannon to raid Westmeath and Longford
Roscommon (GAA)	The Cattle Rustlers	Queen Medb the Queen of going to war to steal cattle was born here
Sligo (GAA)	The Yeats County	Childhood and spiritual home of William Butler Yeats
Sligo (GAA)	The Herring Pickers	The fishing industry
Sligo (GAA)	Land of Heart's Desire	Tourist branding from Yeats's 1894 play The Land of Heart's Desire, set in the barony of Kilmacowen.
Sligo (GAA)	The Zebras	From the county colours (black and white)
Sligo (GAA)	The Magpies	From the county colours (black and white)
Tipperary (GAA)	The Premier County	In the 1840s editor of the Nation newspaper stated that "Where Tipperary leads Ireland follows" due to the nationalistic feeling in Tipperary. The title of The Premier county was further strengthened by the foundation of the GAA and starting the war for Irish independence within County Tipperary. . Attested from 1864 Tipperary has rich prosperous farmland of the Golden Vale. Another is that Tipperary was the seat of Butlers, Earls of Ormond
Tipperary (GAA)	The Stone Throwers	Tipperary agitators were unusually militant during the Land War of the 1870–90s. Stone Throwers Park in Tipperary Hill, Syracuse, New York commemorates an incident in the 1930s when a group of Irish Americans threw stones to prevent an upside-down traffic light being set with the "red above the green".
Tipperary (GAA)	Tipp	Clipping of Tipperary.
Tipperary (GAA)	The Home of Hurling	Referring to Tipperary's success in winning the first All Ireland senior hurling title, and winning most "firsts" in hurling.
Tyrone (GAA)	The O'Neill County	Mediaeval lords
Tyrone (GAA)	The Red Hand County, the Red Hands	The Red Hand of Ulster on the county's GAA crest, also on the arms of the O'Neills
Tyrone (GAA)	"Tyrone among the bushes"	Of unknown origin. Possibly popularised in a poem A Sigh for Old Times by Strabane poet William Collins who took part in the Fenian raids into Canada: "O God be with the good old times when I was twenty-one In "Tyrone among the bushes", where the Finn and Mourne run When my heart was gay and merry, recked then not of care or toil Blithesome as the bells of Derry ringing o’er the sunny Foyle" But the phrase is found predating Collins in A Legend of Knockmany in William Carleton's Traits and Stories of the Irish Peasantry (1845).
Waterford (GAA)	The Déise, Decies	Mediaeval kingdom of the Déisi
Waterford (GAA)	The Suirsiders	River Suir
Waterford (GAA)	The Gentle County	The Gentle County: a Saga of the Decies People by Nicholas Whittle was published in 1959. He chose the title because "We in Waterford have never been too prone to blow our own trumpet"
Waterford (GAA)	The Crystal County	Waterford Crystal
Westmeath (GAA)	The Lake County	Site of many lakes, including Loughs Derravaragh, Ennell, Lene, Owel and Ree
Wexford (GAA)	The Model County	From its progressive farming methods and model farms The first agricultural school in Ireland was opened in Wexford in the 1850s; however, the nickname "model county" was established by 1847 "Exemplar Hiberniae" is the motto chosen for the county arms in 1987.
Wexford (GAA)	The Yellowbellies	Said to have been first applied to a Wexford hurling team raised by Sir Caesar Colclough, which won a challenge match in Cornwall in the reign of William III of England while wearing yellow sashes in tribute to William as Prince of Orange. The county colours (yellow with purple shoulders) reflect this pre-existing nickname
Wexford (GAA)	The Slaneysiders	River Slaney
Wexford (GAA)	The Strawberry Pickers	Due to its relatively warm dry climate, it grows more strawberries than most of Ireland
Wexford (GAA)	An Contae Riabhach "The Streaked/Grey County"	Former Irish-language name used by Seosamh Laoide
Wicklow (GAA)	The Garden of Ireland the Garden county	Possibly from the planted estates of estates such as Powerscourt House; or from the county's scenery; or serving as a garden for the adjacent city of Dublin. Formerly "the garden of Ireland" has been applied to: the Blackwater valley between Mallow and Fermoy; Carlow town; Killough Hill near Cashel; eastern County Westmeath; and the province of Ulster
Wicklow (GAA)	The Goat Suckers	Feral goats roam the Wicklow Mountains.
Wicklow (GAA)	The Last County	Wicklow was the last part of Ireland to be formed into a county by English administrators (in 1606), due to the rebellious O'Byrne and O'Toole clans.

=== Other inter-county GAA teams ===
Outside Ireland, the GAA is organised into regional bodies which have the same status as Irish counties, some of which compete in the same inter-county competitions.

In 2008, the main Dublin and Down hurling teams were supplemented with second teams competing in the Nicky Rackard Cup, respectively called Fingal and South Down.

County	Nickname	Origins and notes
Fingal (GAA)	The Ravens	Ravens appear on the crest of Fingal.
Fingal (GAA)	The Northsiders	Fingal is north of the River Liffey (although "Northsider" often refers to part of Dublin city rather than rural Fingal).
Hertfordshire (GAA)	Herts	Clipping of Hertfordshire
Lancashire (GAA)	Lancs	Clipping of Lancashire
Lancashire (GAA)	Red Rose County	Red Rose of Lancaster, badge of Henry IV of England and symbol of the county of Lancashire
London GAA	The men from the county Hell	"Boys from the County Hell", 1984 song by the Pogues
London GAA	The Exiles	Recruited from Irish emigrants "exiled" in Britain. The nickname is also used for New York GAA and London Irish rugby union club
New York GAA	The Exiles	Recruited from Irish emigrants "exiled" in New York. The nickname is also used for London GAA
South Down GAA	The non-Ardsmen	Players are selected from outside the Ards peninsula, the stronghold of Down hurling
Warwickshire (GAA)	Warks	Clipping of Warwickshire

== See also ==
- Lists of nicknames – nickname list articles on Wikipedia

== Sources ==
- Dolan, Terence Patrick (2006). A Dictionary of Hiberno-English. Dublin: Gill & Macmillan. ISBN 978-0-7171-4039-8.
- Douglas, W. (1900). "Nick-Names of Places". All Ireland Review. 1 (32): 7. doi:10.2307/20544878. ISSN 2009-2415. JSTOR 20544878.
- Share, Bernard (2001). Naming Names: Who, what, where in Irish nomenclature. Dublin: Gill & Macmillan. ISBN 978-0-7171-3125-9.
