= Dolphin Records (Ireland) =

Irish independent record label founded in 1968

- Founded: February 1968
- Founder: Joe O'Reilly Snr.
- Status: Active
- Genre: Irish rock, traditional Irish music, Irish rebel songs, novelty songs
- Country of origin: Ireland
- Location: South City Business Park, Oldbawn, Tallaght, Dublin

Dolphin Records is an independent record label founded in 1968 in Dublin, Ireland by Joe O'Reilly Senior. As of 2018, Joe's son Paul O'Reilly was acting as managing director of the label, and three of his children had also joined the business.

== History ==
=== Dolphin Discs ===
The founding of the record label in 1968 was preceded by the opening of a record shop by Joe O'Reilly Snr named Dolphin Discs in the Dolphin's Barn suburb of Dublin a decade earlier in (approximately) June 1958. The O'Reilly family lived in the nearby suburb of Rialto at the time, later moving to Templeogue.

In February 1960, another branch of Dolphin Discs was opened at 164 Capel Street in Dublin. By 1979, there were five Dolphin Discs shops in Dublin city alone, according to a Hot Press Yearbook published for that year, located at 3 Burgh Quay, 59 Saint Stephen's Street, 22 Marlborough Street, 164 Capel Street, and 2a Talbot Street.

In September 2012, Paul O'Reilly announced that the Talbot Street store would be closing by the end of the month. O'Reilly pointed to "digital downloads as the main culprit for the decline in business at the 40-year-old store, as much as 40% in the past three years".

=== Dolphin Records ===
Dolphin Records was established in February 1968. The Cork Examiner stated that Dolphin Record's first issue, a single named "Two Loves" by Irish singer Sean Dunphy, had been a number one hit in Ireland, however the song does not feature in the list of number-one singles of 1968 in Ireland.

In February 1969, the Cork Examiner reported on singer Muriel Day having recently signed a three year contract with 'Dolphin Records of Dublin', as she was photographed alongside the 'Directors of the record company' Brian Barker and Oliver Barry.

In August 1971, the Irish Independent reported that RTÉ, the Irish state broadcaster, had decided to restrict the broadcasting of an album of Irish rebel songs entitled "Up The Rebels" (featuring the Wolfe Tones), which had been recently re-released by Dolphin. A spokesman for RTÉ said that the broadcaster had decided "not to play records which could create tension in Northern Ireland" (see: The Troubles), but assured that the decision would be rescinded once the problems in Northern Ireland had subsided.

By 1974, it was noted in the Cork Examiner that the record label was going from strength to strength, especially with regards to postal orders from abroad, a market which the label was catering for:

Something which gives delight and encouragement is the number of letters which they (Dolphin) receive every week from various countries from Holland, Belgium, France, Sweden, USA, West Germany etc. which generally begin "While on a holiday in your wonderful country" or words to that effect. Then they go on to mention Dolphin artiste or artistes they heard in Ireland. It is their pleasure to contact them and let them know that the items can be obtained from the Post-A-Disc service operating from 97a Talbot Street by sending a money order for the cost of the record plus postage.

On Monday 16 December 1974, the record label presented a late-night charity show at the Carlton Cinema in Dublin, in aid of the charities Cherish (unmarried mothers) and Women's Aid (domestic violence). The bill included Na Filí, Gemma Hasson, Brendan O'Reilly, The Barleycorn, The Freshmen, Leon Rowsome (sic) Junior (píb uilleann), and Michael Dooley (bodhrán), Bunratty Castle Singers and The Wolfe Tones. Brendan Balfe acted as compere for the evening, while Tom McGrath produced the show.

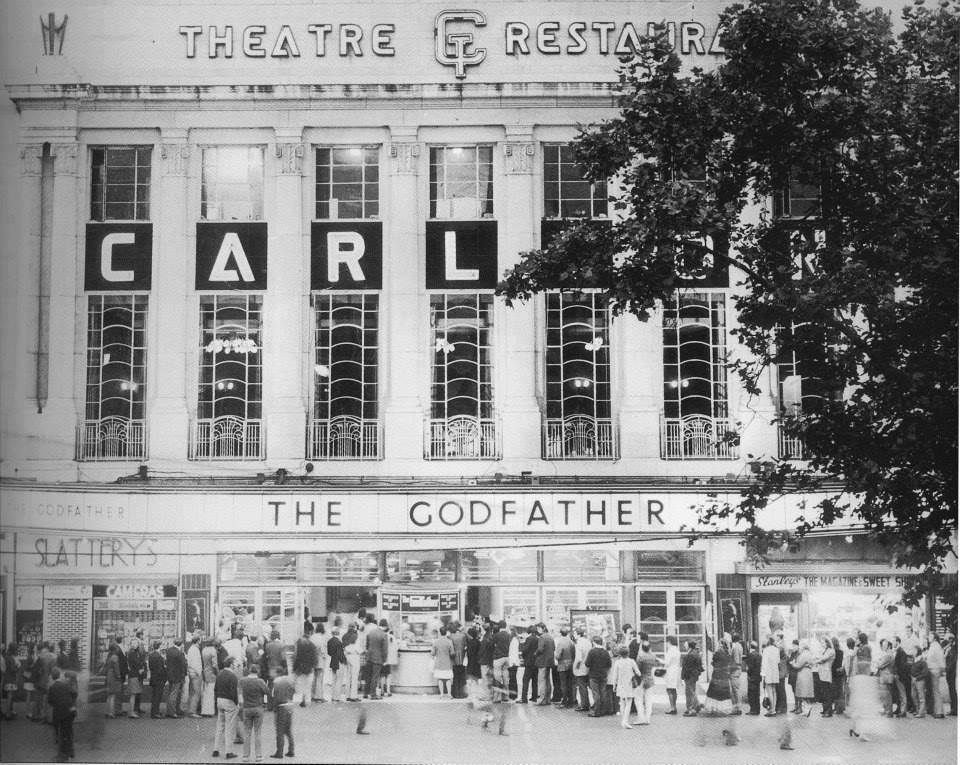
The Carlton Cinema, Dublin in 1972, where Dolphin Records held a charity show in 1974

As of 1976, Dolphin Records, as well as its associated retail chain Dolphin Discs, were still owned by the O'Reilly family, one of whom (Joe) began dating singer Mary Black that year. Joe O'Reilly would eventually marry Black as well as becoming her manager. Joe and his older brother Paul eventually started another record label, Dara Records, on which to launch Black's career feeling that "she was different to their Dolphin artists". Writing of Black's success as of 1993, the Cork Examiner wrote:

Winner of just about every award open to her in this country, a successful recording and performing artiste in America, Australia, Japan and the UK (where she has filled the Albert Hall twice), and blessed with what the New York Post described as A Voice To Die For, it's hard to believe that no Irish label was interested in recorded Mary Black as a solo artiste ten years ago. But every cloud has a silver lining, and from this lack of foresight came Dara Records, who have since built up an enviable reputation for quality Irish recordings.

A 1978 edition of the Irish Times column "An Irishman's Diary", described the process of recording celebrity chef Seán Kinsella for an upcoming Dolphin release:

We jest, slightly. But last Good Friday ("my one day off," says the pale and wan Mr Kinsella, who had another yesterday and spent it cooking lunch for 30 to launch his latest enterprise), along came the people from Dolphin Records to set up their equipment and perch on the counters for 4 ½ hours, in the Mirabeau kitchen, while Mr Kinsella cooked breakfast, lunch and dinner, and talked and talked about it. No, not a studio mock-up, those are yer actual slamming oven doors and clattering iron frying pans you hear on "Seán Kinsella's Kitchen", a cassette tape of advice from one of the country's most successful restauranteurs. He's not talking about gourmet food, he says, just advice for your average housewife or denizen of a flat...

In 1983, the Dolphin group (Dolphin Discs and Dolphin Records) celebrated 25 years in the music industry, and a piece was written about them in the Belfast newspaper Andersonstown News. It was reported that Dolphin Records had by then issued over 200 singles and in excess of fifty albums, and had "built up a name in providing records not alone from the international hit makers, but have also made their own hit makers on the home market". The company revealed their best selling records over the previous 25 years:

...they rate as their best selling singles 1. "All Kinds of Everything" from Dana. 2. "Waterloo" from Abba, and 3. "Hey Jude" from the Beatles. Their top selling albums were 1. "Greatest Hits" from Abba. 2. "Bridge over Troubled Water" by Simon and Garfunkel, and 3. "Visit by Pope John Paul II to Ireland" (a commemorative album released marking the visit by Pope John Paul II to Ireland which had happened in 1979).

In February 1984, Dolphin Records released their first international single - "Taking Off", performed by The Lyle/Livsey Band. The Evening Herald wrote that "you may recognise it as the jingle on the Joe Walsh Tours ad on TV".

In mid-November 1985, Irish comedian Dermot Morgan wrote a novelty single named "Thank You Very Much, Mr. Eastwood", which was released on Dolphin Records the following month. Morgan felt strongly that if he could get a record release before Christmas the song would "pick up a lot of airplay and start to sell". Speaking with the Sunday News on 15 December, Paul O'Reilly of Dolphin said "I think this one will sell between 10,000 and 15,000 copies. It's bound to get into the top five of the Irish charts and stands a very good chance of being number one for Christmas". The song went to number one in Ireland two weeks after its release, and was the Christmas number one in Ireland for that year. By January 1986, the song was also "dancing around the bottom half of the British top 60" charts, according to the Evening Herald. Speaking to the same paper, Morgan thanked O'Reilly and Dolphin Records for having backed the project:

"I wrote it specifically so that it could be accessible to an English audience as well. I felt I had to get it out on disc and then worry about it. And fair play to Paul O'Reilly and Dolphin Records for going with it."

In 1986, the 'megastores' of music retailers Virgin and HMV "invaded" Dublin, according to The Irish Press, and by October 1987 had together taken 19.7% of Ireland's retail music market:

When the so called megastores opened in Dublin 12 months ago - Virgin in the former McBirney's building and HMV stores in Grafton Street - Armageddon was predicted. Independent retailers were going to the wall, those chains such as Golden Discs and Dolphin Records were also bound to fail, the pundits said... Dolphin (Discs) still have five outlets - one in Penneys and the other four retail outlets are scattered about the North City Centre area. Dolphin Discs has rationalised its operations in the retail business, he (Joe O'Reilly of Dolphin Discs) says, and turned their attention to their other interests - a cassette manufacturing company and a record company. "It was inevitable", he says. "It has been obvious from the start that they would take some of the market because the business wasn't there for them all. No-one has had good retail business this year, anyway, and that's not just the record industry."

In 1990, the Evening Echo reported that Irish rock band Royal Flush from Portumna, County Galway had been signed to Dolphin Records - "the only rock band to have been asked to do so"; "Dolphin have always concentrated on promoting major folk groups in the past and have had many international successes with groups like The Dubliners. They forecast a bright future on the international scene for Royal Flush." The band were noted by the paper as being one of Ireland's "biggest rock exports" at the time, after U2, and were regarded in Britain as "the top Irish band playing the ballroom and club circuit", with America expected to follow suit.

In 1992, Dara Records released the compilation album A Woman's Heart, which achieved massive success in Ireland and "remain(ed) the biggest-selling album" in the country as of 2018. In 1993, Dara Records released "Trad Heart", described as "a compilation of the best of Irish traditional music today", moving closer to the genre of music which Dolphin Records had traditionally released.

Dolphin Records was registered with the Companies Registration Office in 2003, with an address at Great Ship Street, Dublin. As of December 2021, Dolphin Records remained active as both a record label and retail chain.

In 2006, Dolphin Records was noted as being the only Irish-owned record label out of the top five highest-earning independent labels in the country that year.

In 2018, the label released a commemorative double album entitled An Irish Welcome to mark the visit by Pope Francis to Ireland in August of that year. Speaking to the Irish Independent, Paul O'Reilly was reluctant to divulge which artists had declined to appear on the album, mentioning "Some of the older ones were not so keen, but younger people were queuing up to get on it", adding that the album was "for believers and non-believers (and) it has a religious theme obviously, but it's not in your face."

During the COVID-19 pandemic, at a time when bands were "at a loose end" and unable to perform to audiences, Paul O'Reilly asked Irish band Aslan to record a version of The Fields of Athenry in their "distinct style". The band recorded it, which turned out to be their last recording with lead singer Christy Dignam owing to his death in June 2023.

== Artists who have appeared on Dolphin Records ==
- Aslan
- Sean Dunphy
- Paddy Cole
- Philomena Begley
- Muriel Day
- The Wolfe Tones
- Shay Healy
- Maisie McDaniel
- The Freshmen
- Cromwell
- Paddy McGuigan
- The Barleycorn
- Dublin City Ramblers
- Noel Purcell
- Fureys and Davey Arthur
- Red Hurley
- Dermot Morgan
- Brendan Bowyer
- Gene Stuart and the Mighty Avons
- Na Filí
- John McCormack
- Ronnie Drew
- Paddy Reilly
- Gemma Hasson
- Micheál Mac Liammóir
- Patsy Watchorn
- Seán Kinsella (chef)

== Singles catalogue (extract) ==
Cat. No.	Title	Artist	Year
DOS 1	Two Loves / Gold and Silver	Sean Dunphy and the Hoedowners	1968
DOS 2	Bottle of Wine / Creole Jazz	Paddy Cole & The Capitol Showband	1968
DOS 3	Simon Says / White Cliffs of Dover	College Boys	1968
DOS 4	Who's Taking You Home Tonight? / Mother Machree	The Vanguard Six Showband (from Tralee)	1968
DOS 5	Ballad of Amelia Earhart / Bile Them Cabbage Down	The Smokey Mountain Ramblers	1968
DOS 6	Tommy Jones / Creeque Alley	Oscar Whifney Sound	1968
DOS 7	Henry My Son / Roll In My Sweet Baby's Arms	Weaver Folk	1968
DOS 8	Far Away Out In Australia / Portobello Road	Oliver Kane	1968
DOS 9	Monkey Time / Song and Dance	John Drummond & The Capitol Showband	1968
DOS 11	My Little Son / Heartaches For A Dime	The Old Cross Bandshow & Philomena Begley	1968

== See also ==
- Dolphin F.C., an Irish football club, also originating from the Dublin suburb of Dolphin's Barn
- Dolton Records, a Seattle-based record label in the USA that was originally known as Dolphin Records
- Dolphin Records, a record label in North Carolina, USA active in the 1980s
- List of record labels
