= Watch house =

Watch house may refer to:

- Guardhouse, a building used to house personnel and security equipment
- Watchhouse, a small prison attached to a police station
- The Watch House, 1977 novel
- Watch House Village, village in Ireland
- Watch House Terrace, row of terraced house in Australia
- Watch House Battery, 19th century artillery battery
