= Nowhere Child =

Nowhere Child may refer to:

- Nowhere Child, a 2015 Novella by Rachel Abbott
- "The Nowhere Child", a 1971 episode of TV series Medical Center

== See also ==
- "Ty, detinushka, sirotinushka" ("You, My Little Nowhere Child"), folk music by Vasily Fyodorovich Trutovsky (c. 1740 – c. 1810)
