= Rachel Abbott =

British author

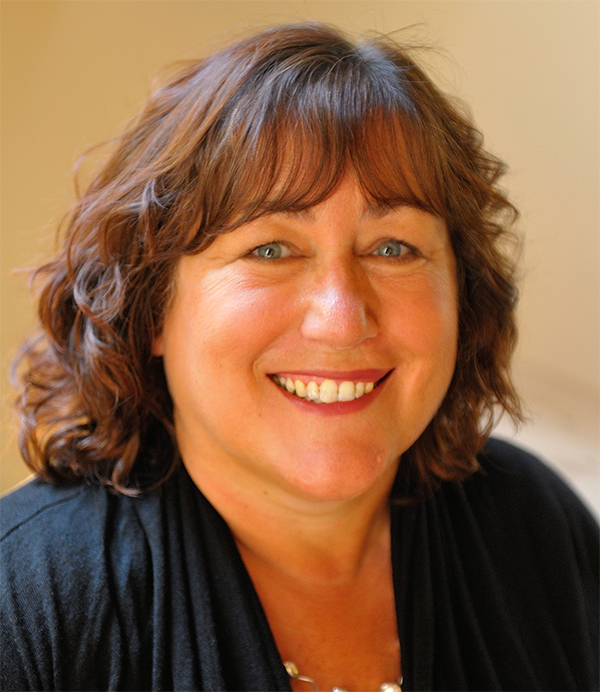
- Born: Sheila Rodgers; 1952 (age 73–74); Manchester, England
- Occupation: Writer
- Writing career
- Pen name: Rachel Abbott
- Period: 2011–present
- Genres: Fiction, crime, thriller
- Notable works: Only the Innocent; Sleep Tight
- Website: www.rachel-abbott.com

Sheila Rodgers (born 1952) is an English author of psychological thrillers under the pen name Rachel Abbott. A self-publisher, her first seven novels (and one novella) have combined to sell over three million copies, and have all been bestsellers on Amazon's Kindle store. In 2015, she was named the 14th bestselling author over the last five years on Amazon's Kindle in the UK.

== Early life ==
Abbott grew up near Manchester, England. She worked as a systems analyst and then founded an interactive media company, developing software and websites for the education market. She sold the company for around £5 million in 2000. Following the sale, she moved from Lancashire, England, to Italy, where she restored a 15th-century Italian monastery that for a time she and her husband operated as a venue for weddings and holidays.

== Career ==
In 2009, Abbott decided to write a book about an average, everyday woman put into a situation where she had no other option but to commit murder. It took Abbott 18 months to write the first draft. In November 2011, after rejection by several literary agents, Abbott, then 59, published her first novel, Only the Innocent, on Amazon, under her pen name. The book sold slowly at first, with sales taking off after Abbott put together a strong marketing campaign.

Abbott followed up Only the Innocent in 2013 with The Back Road and in 2014 with Sleep Tight. Her fourth novel, Stranger Child, was published on 24 February 2015. Later that year, she published the novella Nowhere Child, which has the same characters as Stranger Child. In 2016, she published her sixth novel, Kill Me Again. Her five novels and one novella all focus on relationships and crime, and all feature the same detective, Chief Inspector Tom Douglas. Abbott has described the character as "a genuinely honest, nice guy who just seems to be attracted to the wrong women."

Working with an agent since 2012, she published in the UK and through a publisher in North America. Her books have been translated into seven different languages.

By 2015, Abbott's first three novels, all published in the UK, with the first two published by Thomas & Mercer in the US, had combined to sell one million copies. All three have been bestsellers in Amazon's Kindle store. By March 2016, she had sold two million books. In 2015, Abbott was named Amazon's most popular independently published author in the UK; she is Amazon's number one e-book seller in crime and thriller writing. Also in 2015, she was named the 14th bestselling author over the last five years on Amazon's Kindle in the UK, after first publishing on the platform in 2011. For the year 2015 (through August), Stranger Child was the most borrowed book from Amazon UK's Kindle Owners' Lending Library service, and number 11 on Amazon UK's list of best-selling ebooks of 2015.

In 2017, The Express called her the "Queen of the twisted suspense novel." That year, following a five-way auction, Abbott signed a two-book deal with Headline Publishing Group to become a hybrid author. The first book in the deal, And So It Begins, is a psychological thriller that asks if there can ever be a proper defence for murder. It introduced a new character, Sergeant Stephanie King, and was published in 2018.

Abbott was invited to be a judge for Amazon's inaugural Kindle Storyteller Award in 2017, alongside model and actress Lily Cole and the Alliance of Independent Authors founder Orna Ross.

In 2018, Abbott published her seventh novel, Come a Little Closer. As of 2021, Abbott has sold more than four million copies of her books worldwide.

== Personal life ==
Abbott and her husband divide their time between Marche region of Italy and the island of Alderney, one of the Channel Islands.

== Bibliography ==
Title	Publisher	Publication date	ISBN
Only the Innocent	Thomas & Mercer / Black Dot Publishing	15 November 2011	ISBN 978-0-9576522-1-7
The Back Road	Thomas & Mercer / Black Dot Publishing	3 March 2013	ISBN 978-0-9576522-0-0
Sleep Tight	Black Dot Publishing	24 February 2014	ISBN 978-0-9576522-3-1
Stranger Child	Black Dot Publishing	24 February 2015	ISBN 978-0-9576522-4-8
Nowhere Child (novella)	Black Dot Publishing	29 October 2015	ISBN 978-0957652255
Kill Me Again	Black Dot Publishing	17 February 2016	ISBN 978-0957652262
The Sixth Window	Black Dot Publishing	21 February 2017	ISBN 978-0957652286
Come a Little Closer	Black Dot Publishing	13 February 2018	ISBN 978-1999943707
And So It Begins	Wildfire	15 November 2018	ISBN 978-1472254894
The Shape of Lies	Black Dot Publishing	12 February 2019	ISBN 978-1999943721
Right Behind You	Black Dot Publishing	16 January 2020	ISBN 978-1999943738
The Murder Game	Wildfire	16 April 2020	ISBN 978-1472254962
Close Your Eyes	Black Dot Publishing	11 February 2021	ISBN 978-1999943745
