= Carlton Cinema =

Carlton Cinema may refer to:

- Carlton Cinema (Toronto), cinema in Toronto, Canada
- Carlton Cinema (TV channel), British TV channel 1998–2003
- Carlton Cinema, Dublin, former cinema
- Carlton Cinema, Essex Road, a former cinema, now a Grade II listed building, London
