= Paddy Cole =

Irish musician (1939–2025)

- Born: Patrick Cole; 17 December 1939; Castleblayney, County Monaghan, Ireland
- Died: 22 January 2025 (aged 85) Dublin, Ireland
- Occupations: Singer; musician
- Instruments: Saxophone, clarinet
- Years active: 1955–2025
- Label: Dolphin Records
- Formerly of: The Capitol Showband

Patrick Cole (17 December 1939 – 22 January 2025) was an Irish singer, musician and band leader. He was chiefly associated with the era of showbands in Ireland.

In a career that spanned 70 years, Cole first appeared on stage at the age of 12. He joined the Capitol Showband in the early 1960s, before being recruited by the Big Eight Showband and appearing in Las Vegas. Cole returned to Ireland and formed the Paddy Cole Band, later renamed the Paddy Cole Superstars.

Cole died from lung cancer on 22 January 2025, at the age of 85.
