= Slaney Valley =

Single by Larry Cunningham
- B-side: "I Was Coming Home To You"
- Released: 1971
- Recorded: 1971
- Studio: Eamonn Andrews Studios
- Genre: country
- Length: 3:15
- Label: Release
- Songwriters: Paddy Kehoe & Tom Kinsella
- Producer: Dermot O'Brien

Larry Cunningham singles chronology
"Pride of the West" (1971)	"Slaney Valley" (1971)	"Four Great Irish Hits, Volume 1" (1972)

"Slaney Valley" is a 1971 Irish country song written by Paddy Kehoe and performed by Irish singer Larry Cunningham and his band the Country Blue Boys.

== Lyrics ==
A speaker addresses his lover and asks her to come with him to the valley of the Slaney, a river in County Wexford and County Carlow, Ireland.

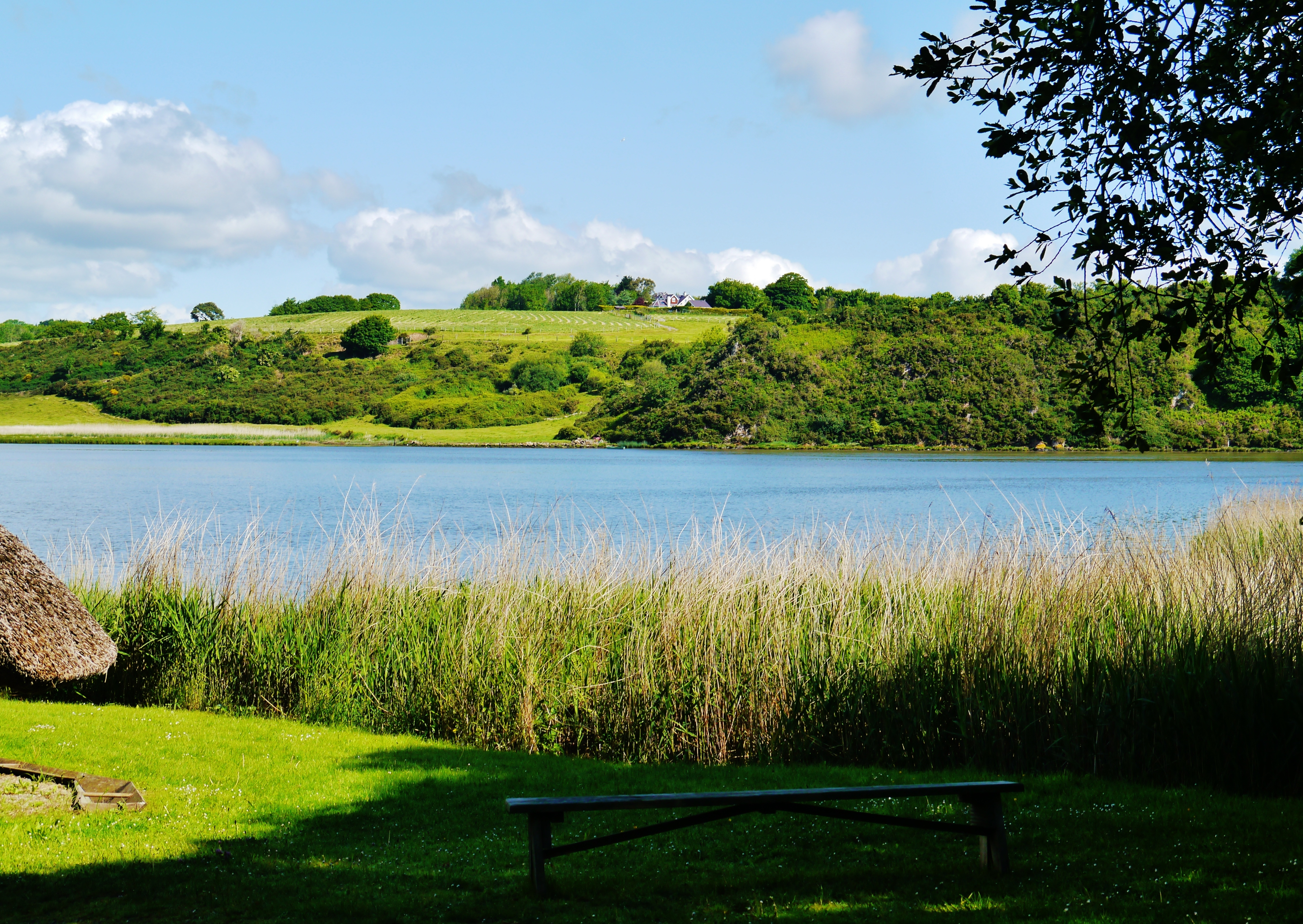
Part of the Slaney valley

== Song history ==
The song was written by Paddy Kehoe of Enniscorthy, who was the father of the hurler Padge Kehoe. The melody was composed by Tom Kinsella.

"Slaney Valley" was released in 1971 and reached number 1 in the Irish singles chart for the week of 1 January 1972.

The song is mentioned in Orna Ross's 2005 novel Lovers' Hollow.
