= Clonegal =

Village in County Carlow, Ireland

Clonegal Irish: Cluain na nGall
- Village
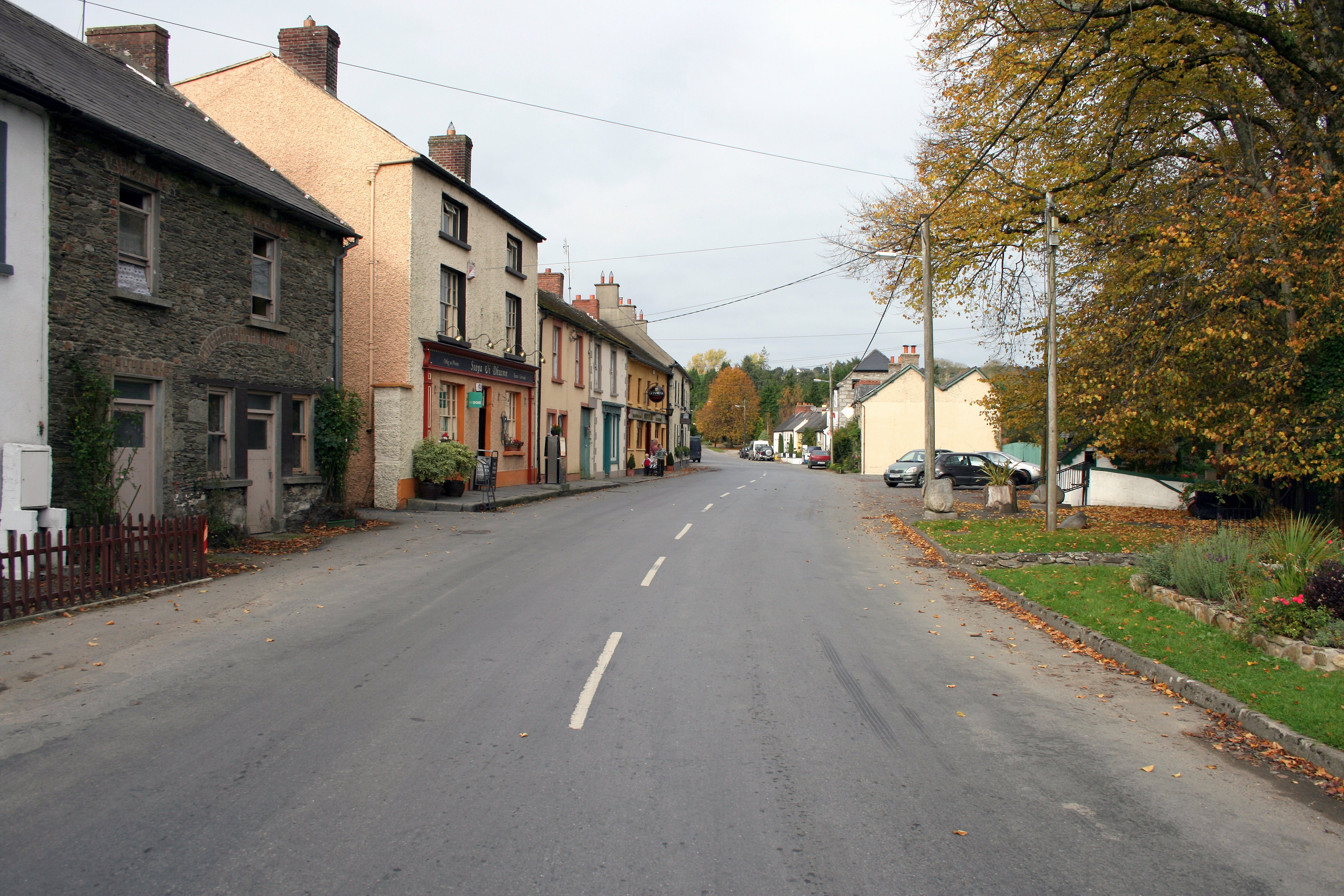
- Main Street

- Location in Ireland
- Coordinates: 52°41′26″N 6°38′43″W
- Country: Ireland
- Province: Leinster
- County: Carlow
- Elevation: 83 m (272 ft)

Population (2022)
  - Total: 249
- Time zone: UTC+0 (WET)
  - Summer (DST): UTC-1 (IST (WEST))
- Irish Grid Reference: S916607

Clonegal, officially Clonegall (/ˈkloʊnəɡɔːl/ KLOH-nə-gawl; from Irish Cluain na nGall, meaning 'meadow of the foreigners'), is a village in the southeast of County Carlow, Ireland. It is in a rural setting, close to the border between counties Wexford and Carlow, 5 km (3 mi) from Bunclody, County Wexford and 22 km (14 mi) from Carlow town. It is just over a mile north of where the River Slaney and the River Derry meet. Clonegal has a much smaller "twin" village across the River Derry in County Wexford, Watch House Village.

The village is served by a primary school, and is the centre of an agricultural hinterland.

== History ==
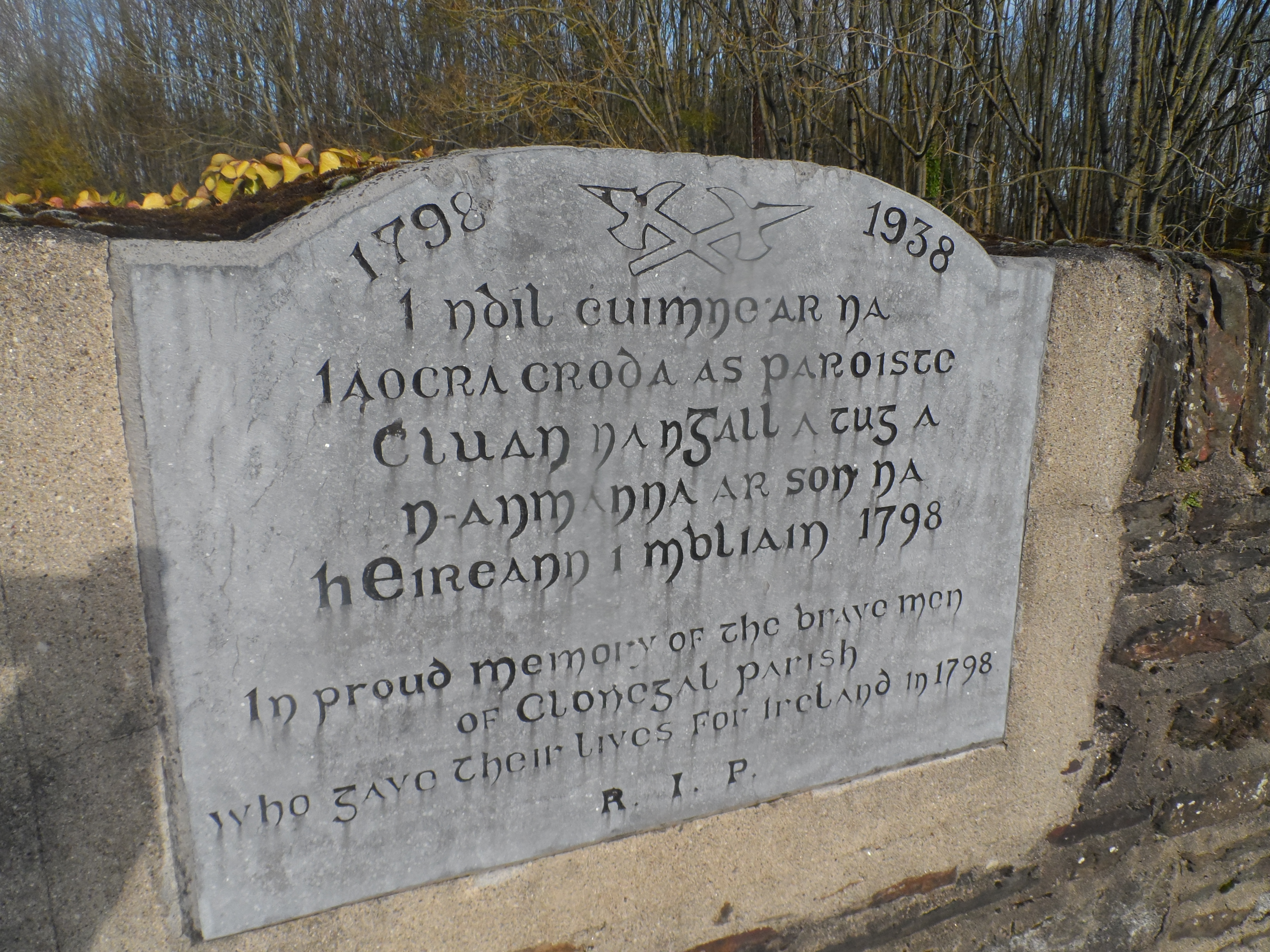
1798 monument in Clonegal

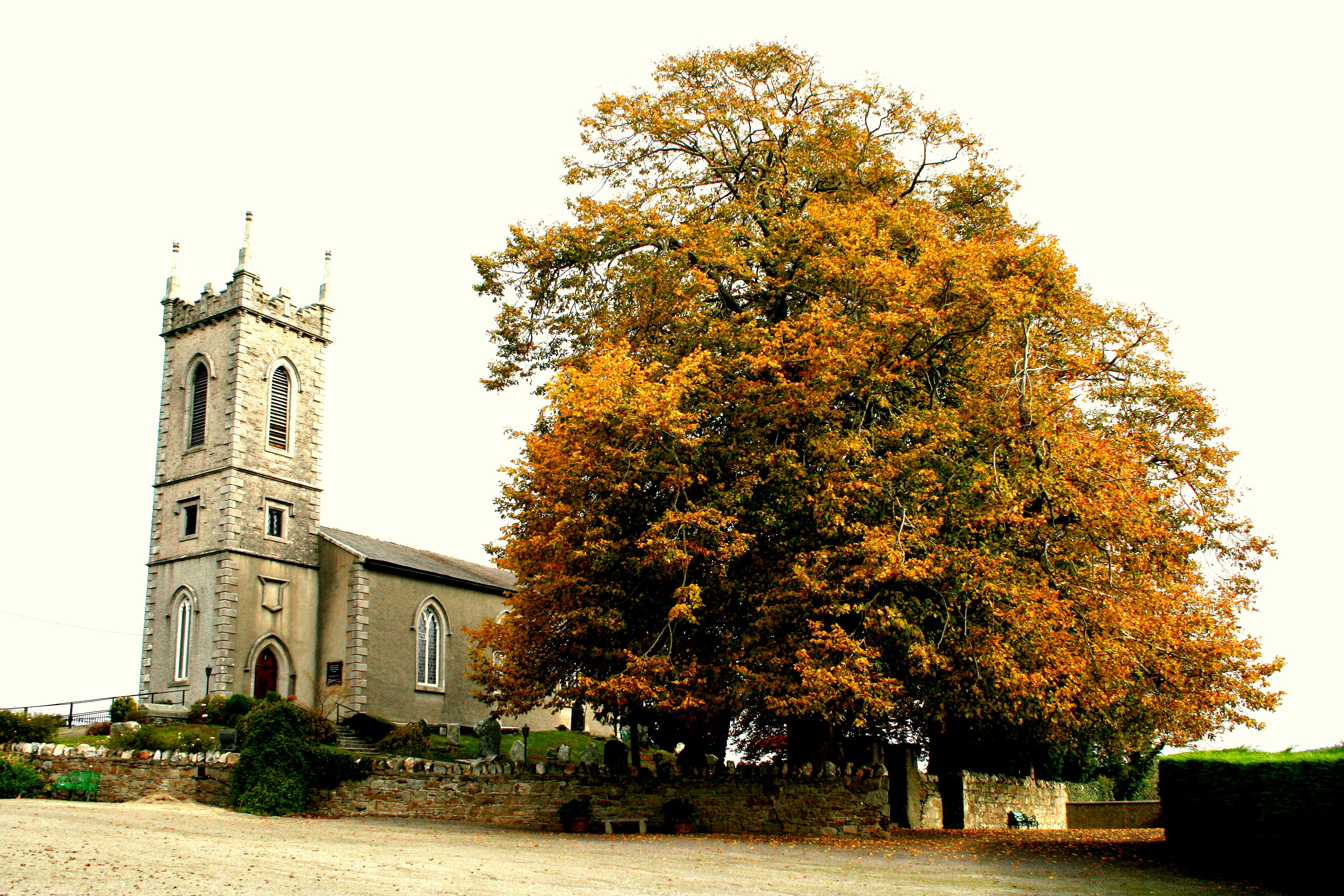
Saint Fiaac's Church of Ireland, Clonegal

Evidence of ancient settlement in the area includes ringfort, bullaun stone and holy well sites in the surrounding townlands of Clonegall, Abbeydown and Huntington.

Huntington Castle, also known as Clonegal Castle, is a 17th-century tower house close to the village centre. Built by Laurence Esmonde, 1st Baron Esmonde on the site of an earlier (possibly 15th century) structure, Huntington Castle was further extended in the 18th and 19th centuries.

Clonegal's Church of Ireland church, St Fiaac's, was built c. 1819 on the site of a much earlier church and ecclesiastical enclosure. The nearby rectory, now a private house, was the residence of the local yeomanry commander during the 1798 Rebellion, and several United Irishmen prisoners were reputedly hanged in a neighbouring yard at what is now known locally as the "Hanging Arch".

The local Roman Catholic church, St Brigid's, was built c. 1845.

There were once eleven malt houses in and around the village, along with a wool and corn store, a police station and other shops.

Kildavin/Clonegal GAA club was formed in 1914.

Clonegal won the "tidiest village" category in the 2014 and 2015 National Tidy Towns competitions.

== Demographics ==
According to the 2006 Census, Clonegal had a population of approximately 280, an increase of 20% since the 2002 Census. As of the 2022 census, the population was 249.

== Notable people ==
- Peter Murphy, radio and television broadcaster, was from the area.
- Patrick O'Donoghue, the 19th century Irish nationalist revolutionary and journalist.

== See also ==
- List of towns and villages in Ireland
