= Lovely Leitrim =

Single by Larry Cunningham
- B-side: "There's That Smile Again"
- Released: September 1965
- Recorded: 1965
- Studio: Eamonn Andrews Studios
- Genre: country
- Length: 2:36
- Label: King Records / R & B Discs Ltd
- Songwriter: Philip Fitzpatrick
- Producer: Noel Kelehan (musical director)

"Lovely Leitrim" is a 1966 country song written by Philip Fitzpatrick and performed by Irish showband singer Larry Cunningham and his band, The Mighty Avons. The song is a ballad in waltz time.

== Lyrics ==
The song is written from the point of the view of a member of the Irish diaspora dreaming that he has returned to County Leitrim, Ireland. Sites in the county mentioned include Lough Allen, the River Shannon, Carrick-on-Shannon, Sheemore and Fenagh.

== Song history ==
"Lovely Leitrim" was written by Irish emigrant NYPD patrolman Philip Fitzpatrick (1892–1947), a native of Aughavas, County Leitrim. The singer Larry Cunningham was actually from nearby County Longford, not from Leitrim; his mother taught him the song.

"Lovely Leitrim" was released by Cunningham in September 1965, and was number one on the Irish Singles Chart for two weeks in January 1966. On its success, Cunningham commented that, "Up to then they would throw pennies at you if you were a showband playing a ballad. But 'Lovely Leitrim' changed all that."

The song has also been recorded by Nathan Carter and Bonnie Stewart.

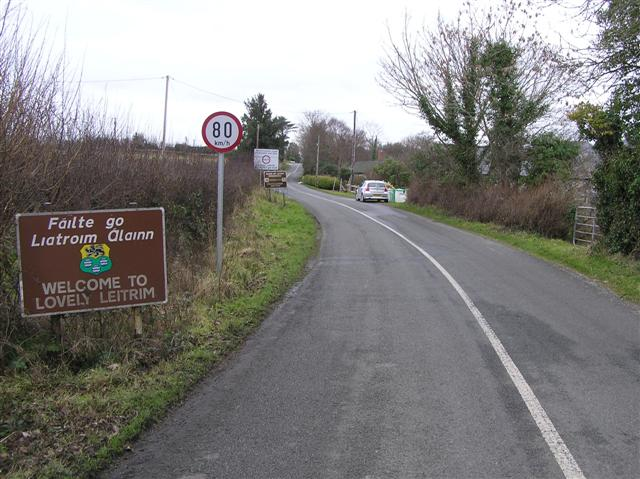
Sign on a road entering County Leitrim, calling it "Lovely Leitrim" from the song.

"Lovely Leitrim" is considered the county song of County Leitrim.
