= Billy Brown (Irish musician) =

Irish musician and artist (1943–1999)

William Brown (1943 – 6 June 1999) was a musician and artist from Northern Ireland. He was a singer, saxophonist, and pianist with The Freshmen, an Irish showband of the 1960s and 1970s.

== Life ==
Brown was born in Larne, County Antrim in Northern Ireland. While studying at the Belfast College of Art he joined Billy McFarland's Showband. Later he formed The Freshmen with some friends. Through Brown's arrangements, the band were able to reproduce sophisticated vocal harmonies in their covers of songs such as "Papa Oom Mow Mow", "The Little Old Lady from Pasadena", and "Carpet Man".

In a tribute to Brown following his death, Freshmen founder-member, Maurice Henry, described his late friend's pivotal role in the band:

You could say Billy was The Freshmen and without his talent and innovative musical skills we would certainly not have achieved as much, either as a showband or in our recordings.

Brown left The Freshmen in the mid 1970s to pursue other musical projects, albeit with limited success. He later rejoined the band and, in 1977, they had one of their biggest hits with his composition, "Cinderella". Following the breakup of The Freshmen, Brown had a minor solo hit in 1980 with his own song, "Look What Jerry Lee Did To Me".

In his latter years, Brown developed his interest in wildlife, becoming a painter of nature scenes, as well as contributing his insights into the natural world on to RTÉ 2fm's children's show, Poporama.

Billy Brown died of a heart attack on 6 June 1999, at his home in Johnstown, County Kildare, Republic of Ireland. In its obituary, the Irish Independent referred to him as "one of the most gifted musicians of his generation".
