= Peter Murphy (broadcaster) =

Irish radio and television broadcaster

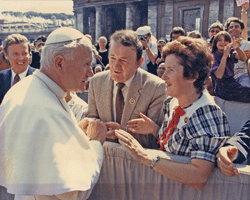
- Meeting Pope John Paul II in 1983
- Born: 21 January 1923; Carlow, Ireland
- Died: 3 June 2011 (aged 88)
- Education: Cloegal N.S., Carnew V.S. & Warrenstown Agricultural College.
- Occupations: Radio and television broadcaster
- Years active: 1953–1992
- Employer(s): RTÉ, Macra na Feirme
- Notable work: Cross Country Quiz
- Spouse: Bridie Murphy (1967–2011)
- Children: John, Christina, Shirley, Peter

Peter David Murphy (21 January 1923 – 3 June 2011) was an Irish radio and television broadcaster, best known as the host of the RTÉ's Cross Country Quiz.

== Background and early life ==
Murphy was born in Huntington, Clonegal, County Carlow and was the youngest of the three children (and only son) of John and Julia Murphy. John Murphy (1879–1961) was a farm manager at Huntington Castle, while Julia was a shop assistant in the nearby village of Clonegal. He was educated at the local national school and, later, Carnew Vocational School, before graduating to Warrenstown Agricultural College, County Meath.

Throughout his twenties, Murphy helped form his local branch of Macra na Feirme and became secretary of the organisation's regional executive, during which time he won several medals for public speaking and debating. He was also involved in sport, and competed at minor, junior and senior level inter-county Gaelic football for his native Carlow. He also played cricket and handball.

== Career ==
Murphy was appointed National Organiser of Macra na Feirme in 1953, and played a role in the formation of the National Farmers Association in 1955. His work brought him around Ireland and he found himself being introduced as "the man who knew more people in the country than anyone else" and "the voice of rural Ireland". This, together with a distinctive speaking voice, found him in demand as a presenter of Sponsored Radio Programmes, between 1961 and 1979, for nine different companies including: Whelehans of Finglas, Irish Farmers Journal, ACC, Nitrogen Éireann, Bank of Ireland, Associated Livestock Marts, Farming Independent, Hygeia of Galway and Goulding Fertilisers.

Throughout the 1960s Murphy began to develop a radio and television career with RTÉ that would last into the 1980s. Works on radio included Country Call, Meet The People and Around The Country. However, it was through television that Murphy was to become most widely recognised. His break came on the 1960s agricultural series Land Mark. This led to the roles of question-master and question-setter (and later on as adjudicator) on the joint RTÉ/BBC production of Cross Country Quiz. Between 1973 and 1988 Murphy compiled a total of 14 quiz books based on the programme – all of them best sellers in the year of their publication.

Murphy formally retired in 1992, but continued to accept invites as a quizmaster all over the country for many years after and continued to compile crosswords for several newspapers, including the Sunday Independent.

== Personal life ==
Murphy married Bridie McEvoy in 1967. They had four children and three grandchildren. He died on 3 June 2011 at age 88.
