= Seán Kinsella =

Irish chef (1931–2013)

Kinsella outside the Mirabeau, 1977

Seán Kinsella (1931 – 20 May 2013) was an Irish restaurateur, regarded as Ireland's first celebrity chef, who owned and operated the Mirabeau restaurant in Sandycove, Dublin, during the 1970s and 1980s.

== Biography ==
Kinsella was born in 1931 in Cooraclare, County Clare, but moved to Dublin as a child, and grew up on Clonliffe Road in north Dublin. He left school early, and by age 14 was working in the kitchens of Dublin's Gresham Hotel. He later worked in Jammets, a leading Dublin restaurant, and from 1953 to 1972 worked as executive chef on P&O Cruises vessels, mainly the SS Oronsay. In 1972, he met his wife Audrey in New York. Later that year the couple returned to Ireland and bought the existing Mirabeau restaurant, on the coast road at Sandycove on Dublin Bay.

In 1978, the "An Irishman's Diary" column in the Irish Times described Kinsella recording an audio album of recipes for the Irish independent label Dolphin Records.

But last Good Friday ("my one day off," says the pale and wan Mr Kinsella, who had another yesterday and spent it cooking lunch for 30 to launch his latest enterprise), along came the people from Dolphin Records to set up their equipment and perch on the counters for 4 ½ hours, in the Mirabeau kitchen, while Mr Kinsella cooked breakfast, lunch and dinner, and talked and talked about it. No, not a studio mock-up, those are yer actual slamming oven doors and clattering iron frying pans you hear on "Seán Kinsella's Kitchen", a cassette tape of advice from one of the country's most successful restauranteurs. He's not talking about gourmet food, he says, just advice for your average housewife or denizen of a flat...

Under Kinsella, the Mirabeau restaurant acquired a high reputation, attracting a clientele of wealthy local and international celebrities. It distinguished itself by not showing prices on the menu (apart from the host's menu), presenting the ingredients before cooking for the guests' approval, serving generous portions, and allowing guests to stay as long as they wanted.

The restaurant won many international awards, including the Wedgwood Award as one of the world's top 50 restaurants in 1981, and Kinsella himself received an honorary doctorate from Boston University in the United States. Kinsella lived a flamboyant lifestyle, displaying his Rolls-Royce car and mixing in the highest levels of the Irish social scene, though he never drank alcohol.

Kinsella regularly took part in charity catering events, such as cooking Christmas dinners for the homeless at Dublin's Mansion House.

In 1984, financial difficulties with the tax authorities resulted in the closure of the Mirabeau, and the Kinsella family, who had been living on the premises, had to leave. The restaurant was bought by investors, and Michel Flamme became the chef. He suffered from diabetes, and died on 20 May 2013, aged 81. The site of the restaurant is now occupied by an apartment block.
