= Gene Stuart =

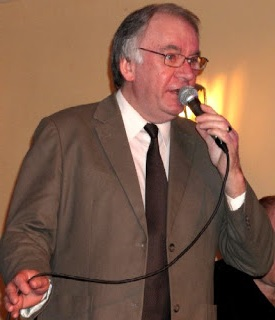
- Gene Stuart performing in 2012

Background information
- Born: 1944; County Tyrone, Northern Ireland
- Died: 11 February 2016 (aged 72)
- Genres: Country
- Occupation: Singer
- Instruments: vocals
- Years active: 1969–2016
- Label: Dolphin Records
- Website: genestuart.com

Eugene Stewart (1944 – 11 February 2016) known professionally as Gene Stuart, was an Irish country music singer, born in County Tyrone, in Northern Ireland.

== Career ==
Stuart's first found success when Larry Cunningham left the Mighty Avons showband in 1969, after auditioning he landed the role of lead singer. After charting in Ireland on many occasions he later left the Mighty Avons in 1974 to form his own band – The Homesteaders. Prior to finding fame, Stuart worked as a brick-layer and as a photographer with the Dungannon Observer newspaper.

== Style ==
Stuart charted with many cover versions of US country hits as well as some more traditional Irish songs.

== Selected discography ==
=== Singles ===
- 1969 Before the Next Teardrop Falls (Number 3, Irish Charts)
- 1970 I'm Just Lucky I Guess (Number 5, Irish Charts)
- 1971 I'd Rather Love and Lose You (Number 11, Irish Charts)
- 1971 Don't Go (Number 9, Irish Charts)
- 1972 Kiss an Angel Good Mornin' (Number 6, Irish Charts)
- 1973 Papa's Wagon (Number 20, Irish Charts)
- 1973 Christmas in my Hometown (Number 2, Irish Charts)
- 1974 If Teardrops were Pennies (Number 19, Irish Charts)
- 1974 The Man Behind the Gun
- 1975 Santa and the Kids (Number 15, Irish Charts)
- 1975 My Nora (Number 14, Irish Charts)
- 1979 She is the Dream
- 1981 Old Fashioned Girl

=== Albums ===
- 1981 Pure Country (K-Tel records, Compilation Album)
- 1998 Once Again
- 2000 Ireland's Country Legend
- 2000 Sincerely Irish
- 2017 (Posthumous release)Old Loves and Country Memories

(Note There were very many more singles and LP's pre ITunes etc., this section will be constantly improved when references to same can be found)
