= The Sash =

Ulster loyalist ballad

"The Sash" (Roud 32245) also known as "The Sash My Father Wore") is a ballad from Northern Ireland commemorating the victory of King William III in the Williamite War in Ireland in 1690–1691. The lyrics mention the 1689 Siege of Derry, the 1689 Battle of Newtownbutler near Enniskillen, the 1691 Battle of Aughrim, and the 1690 Battle of the Boyne. It is popular amongst Ulster loyalists and many other unionists in Northern Ireland, it also remains a popular folk ballad in parts of Ireland and Scotland.

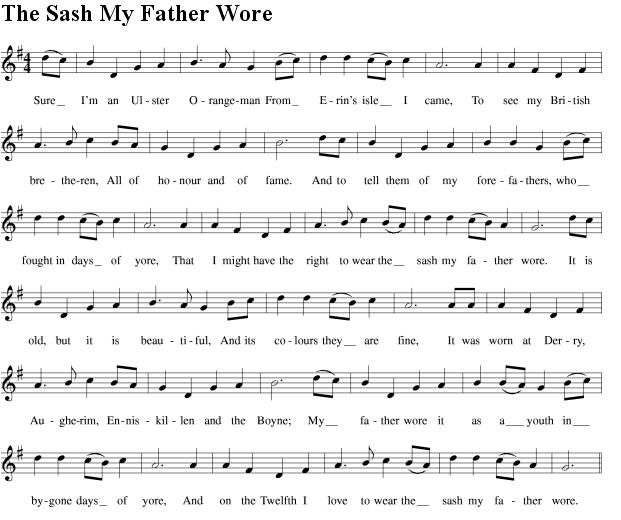
The Sash, music score

The melody has been traced back to the early 19th century. The tune of "The Sash" was well known around Europe, and before the lyrics were added, it was a love song that lamented the division between people. Instead of "it was old and it was beautiful", the lyrics were "she was young and she was beautiful" and is in Broadside Ballads (1787), titled "Irish Molly O". Another known printing of the tune is from 1876 including the words "The Hat My Father Wore". The song is classified in the Roud Folk Song Index as number 4796.

== Lyrics ==
So sure I'm an Ulster Orangeman, from Erin's isle I came,
To see my British brethren all of honour and of fame,
And to tell them of my forefathers who fought in days of yore,
That I might have the right to wear the sash my father wore!

Chorus:
It is old but it is beautiful, and its colours they are fine

It was worn at Derry, Aughrim, Enniskillen and the Boyne.

My father wore it as a youth in bygone days of yore,

And on the Twelfth, I love to wear the sash my father wore.

For those brave men who crossed the Boyne have not fought or died in vain
Our Unity, Religion, Laws, and Freedom to maintain,
If the call should come we'll follow the drum, and cross that river once more
That tomorrow's Ulsterman may wear the sash my father wore!

Chorus

And when some day, across the sea to Antrim's shore you come,
We'll welcome you in royal style, to the sound of flute and drum
And Ulster's hills shall echo still, from Rathlin to Dromore
As we sing again the loyal strain of the sash my father wore!

Chorus
