= River Derry =

River in southeastern Ireland, tributary of the Slaney

River Derry An Doiríoch
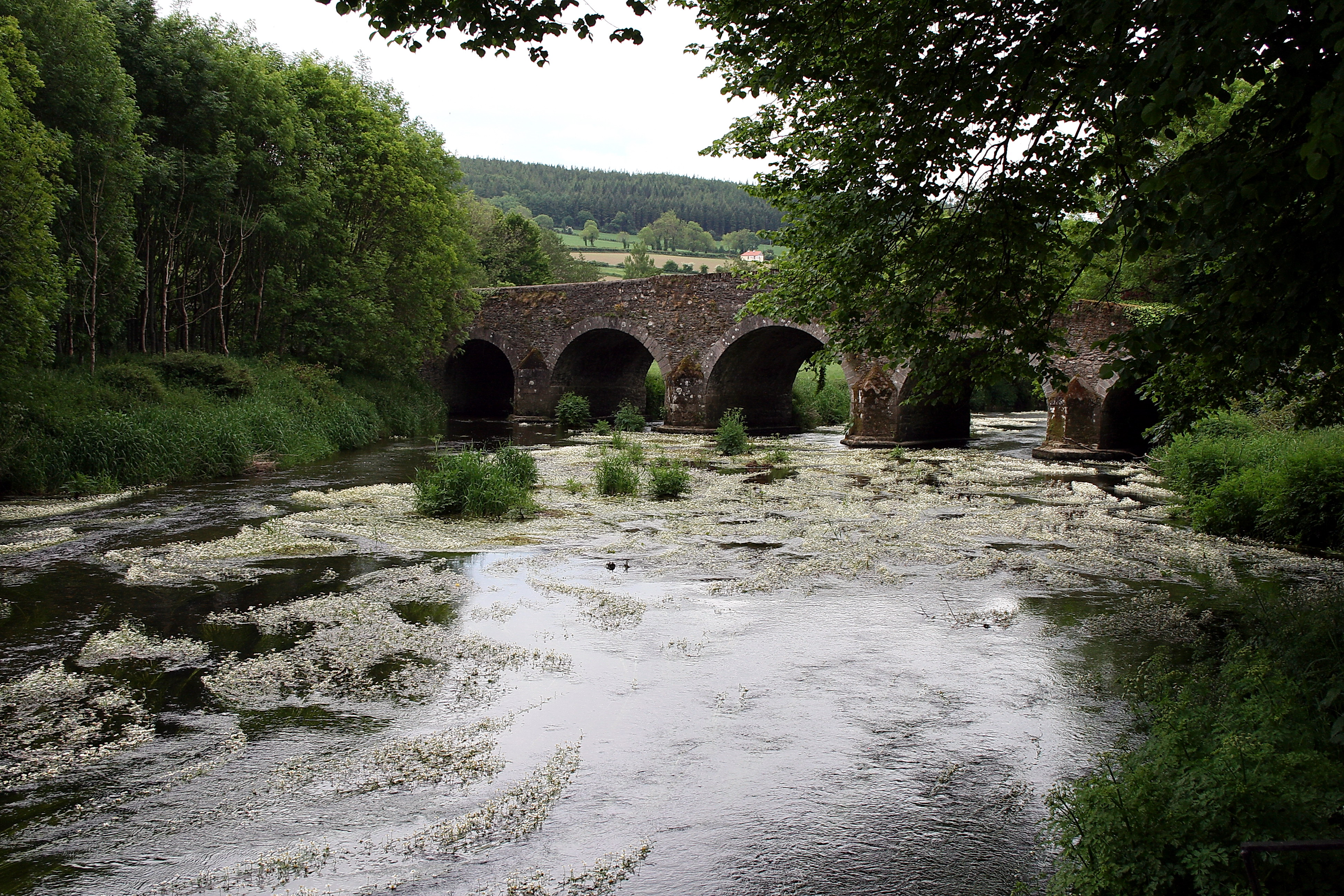
- The Derry flows under Clonegal Bridge
- Etymology: dairgech, "planted with oaks"

Physical characteristics
- Source
  - location: East of Eagle Hill, near Hacketstown, County Carlow
  - elevation: 349 metres (1,145 ft)
- Mouth: River Slaney
  - location: Kildavin, County Carlow
- Length: 34 km (21 mi)

Basin features
- River system: River Slaney

The River Derry (Irish: An Doiríoch) is a large river in the southeast of Leinster, Ireland, a tributary of the River Slaney. It rises just south of Hacketstown, County Carlow. It flows southeast to Tinahely, being accompanied by the R747 regional road for the distance.

South of Tinahely it turns sharply and flows southwest through Shillelagh, briefly forming the border between County Wicklow and County Wexford, before becoming the border between County Wexford and County Carlow.

It flows under Clonegal Bridge at a point where it divides Clonegal, County Carlow to the west from Watch House Village, County Wexford, to the east. A few kilometres further downstream it flows into the River Slaney.

Derry Water River is a separate tributary, which rises near Tinahely and flows north-eastwards to form the Aughrim River.

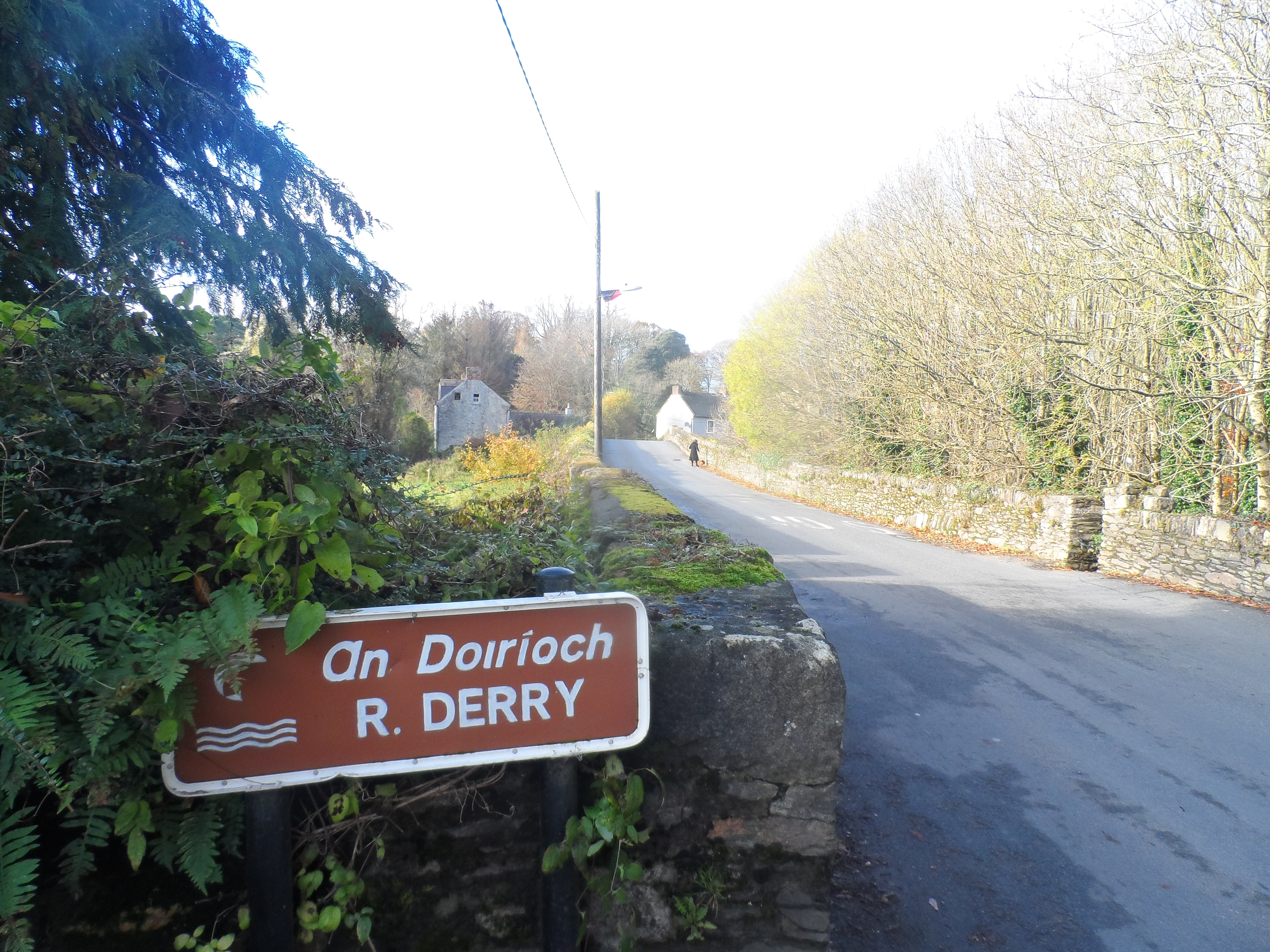
Sign before bridge in Clonegal

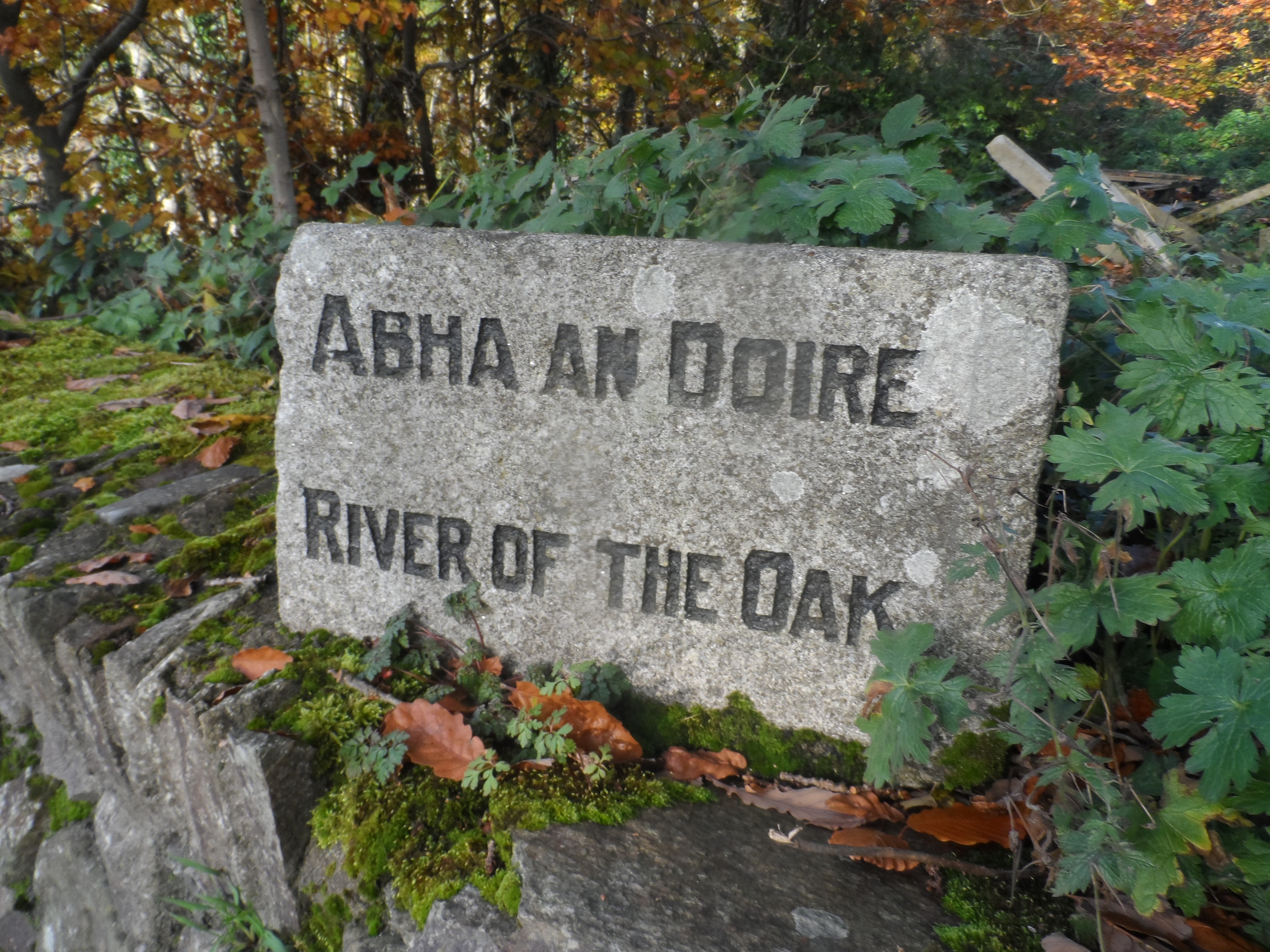
Sign with an alternate Irish name, Abha an Doire

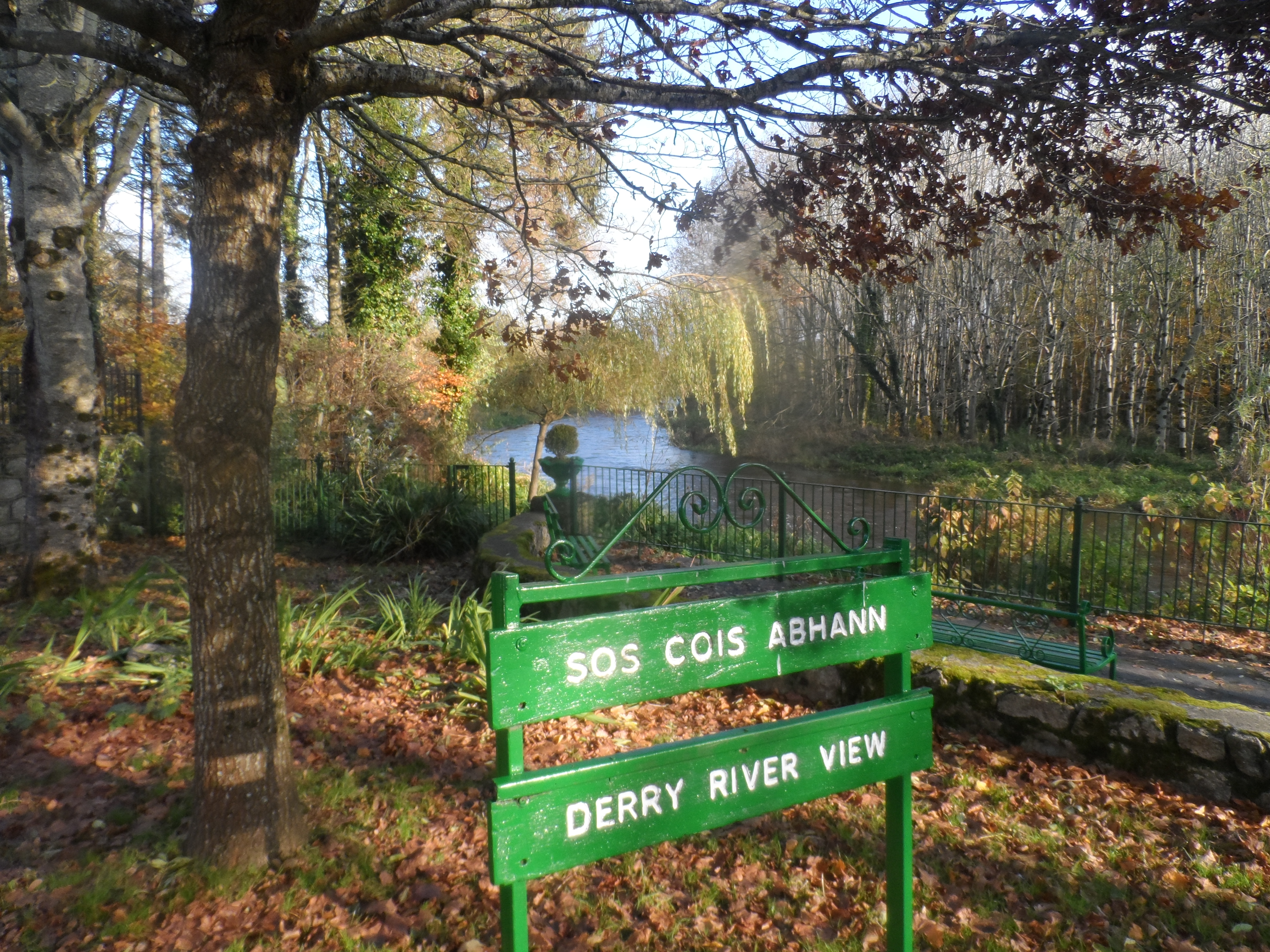
Derry River view

== See also ==
- Rivers of Ireland
