= Irish Molly O =

Irish Molly-o is a traditional Irish song of Irish and Scottish origin. Widely popular in North America in the early 19th century, it was first published by A.W. Aunner in Philadelphia around 1830 and later in New York City by Kennedy. Both "The Hat My Father Wore" and "The Sash My Father Wore" were adapted from this song.

== Lyrics ==
Tell me who is that poor stranger that lately came to town
And like a pilgrim all alone, he wanders up and down
He's a poor forlorn Glasgow lad and if you would like to know
His heart is breaking all in vain for Irish Molly-o

She is young and she is beautiful and her likes I've never known
The lily of old Ireland and the primrose of Tyrone
She's the lily of old Ireland and no matter where I go
My heart will always hunger for my Irish Molly-o

Oh but when her father heard of this a solemn vow he swore
That if she wed a foreigner, he would never see her more
He called for young MacDonald and he plainly told him so
I'll never give to such as you my Irish Molly-o

MacDonald heard the heavy news and sadly he did say
Farewell my lovely Molly, I am banished far away
Till death shall come to comfort me and to the grave I go
My heart will always hunger for my Irish Molly-o

=== Other songs with the same title ===
The other Irish Molly-o, a different song entirely, was recorded by the Flanagan Brothers in the 1920s and by Maura O'Connell and others in the 1980s. It was written by the Tin Pan Alley duo of William Jerome and Jean Schwartz in 1890.
