= River Slaney =

River in southeastern Ireland

Coordinates: 52°20′N 6°27′W

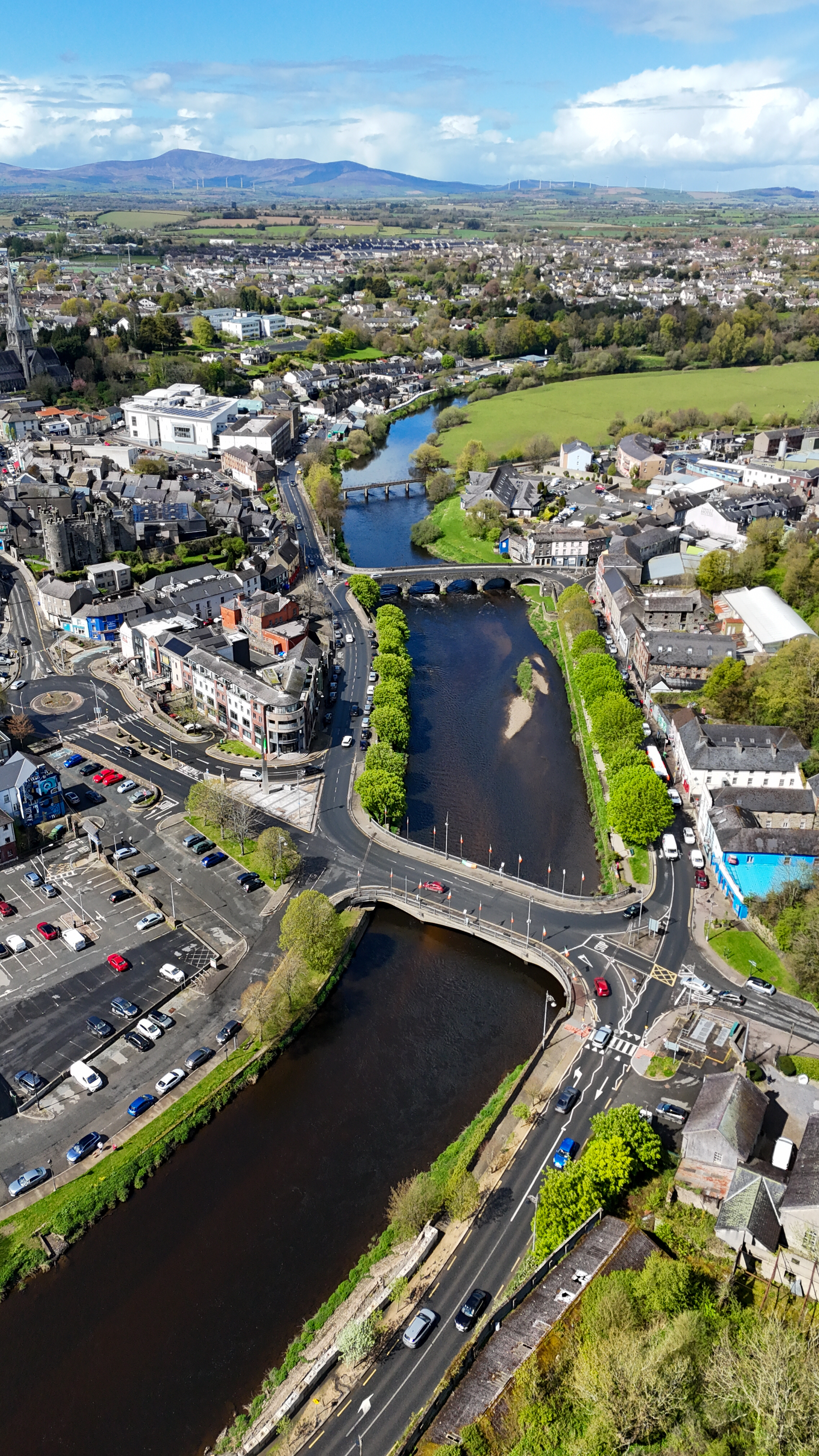
- River Slaney at Enniscorthy

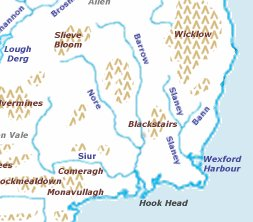
- Map of the rivers of southeast Ireland
- Etymology: Old Irish sláine, "health"
- Native name: An tSláine (Irish); Abhainn na Sláine (Irish)

Location
- Country: Ireland

Physical characteristics
- Source
  - location: Lugnaquilla, County Wicklow
  - elevation: 549 metres (1,801 ft)
- Mouth: Irish Sea
  - location: Wexford Harbour, County Wexford
- Length: 117.5 kilometres (73.0 mi)
- Basin size: 1,762 square kilometres (680 sq mi)
- Discharge
  - average: 37 m^{3}/s (1,300 cu ft/s)

Basin features
- Tributaries
  - left: River Derreen, River Derry, River Bann, River Ballyedmond, River Sow
  - right: Browns Beck Brook, River Clody, River Urrin, River Boro

The River Slaney (/ˈsleɪniː/; Irish: An tSláine) is a river in the southeast of Ireland. It rises on Lugnaquilla Mountain in the western Wicklow Mountains and flows west and then south through counties Wicklow, Carlow and Wexford for 117.5 km (73 mi), before entering St George's Channel in the Irish Sea at Wexford town. The estuary of the Slaney is wide and shallow and is known as Wexford Harbour. The catchment area of the River Slaney is 1,762 km^{2}. Its long-term average flow rate is 37.4m^{3}/s.

Towns that the Slaney runs through include Stratford-on-Slaney, Baltinglass, Tullow, Bunclody, Enniscorthy and Wexford. The river is crossed by 32 road bridges and one railway bridge.

== Wildlife ==
Varied and plentiful wildlife can be found in the environs of the river. In Wicklow, herds of deer can be seen, as well as swans, dippers, mallards, herons and kingfishers. At dusk, bats, owls and otters may be seen, while the mudflats of the estuary are favoured by black-headed gulls, redshanks and oystercatchers. The goosander can be seen on the Slaney at Kildavin. In season, salmon and trout and pike are fished.

== History ==
River Slaney Improvement Act 1852
- Act of Parliament
- Parliament of the United Kingdom
- Long title: An Act to appoint Commissioners for the Execution of certain Improvements in the Navigation of the River Slaney, and for other Purposes.
- Citation: 15 & 16 Vict. c. clii

Dates
- Royal assent: 30 June 1852
Other legislation
Repealed by	River Slaney Act 1857

Status: Repealed

Text of statute as originally enacted

River Slaney Act 1857
- Act of Parliament
- Parliament of the United Kingdom
- Long title: An Act to repeal "The River Slaney Improvement Act, 1852," and to make better Provision for the Execution of the Objects of that Act; and for other Purposes connected with the River Slaney.
- Citation: 20 & 21 Vict. c. xcvii

Dates
- Royal assent: 27 July 1857

Text of statute as originally enacted

Ptolemy's Geography (2nd century AD) described a river called Μοδοννος (Modonnos, "mudflats") which may have referred to the River Slaney, though scholarly opinion remains divided on the issue.

There is a reference to the Slaney in the Irish ballad Boolavogue, commemorating the Battle of Vinegar Hill in the Irish Rebellion of 1798.

"Slaney Valley" was a 1972 Irish number one for Larry Cunningham.

== Tributaries ==
Tributaries of the Slaney include the River Derreen, the River Derry, the River Clody, the River Bann, the River Urrin, the River Boro, and the River Sow.

== See also ==
- Rivers of Ireland
