= Alliance of Independent Authors =

Non-Profit Organisation of Independent Authors of United Kingdom

The Alliance of Independent Authors
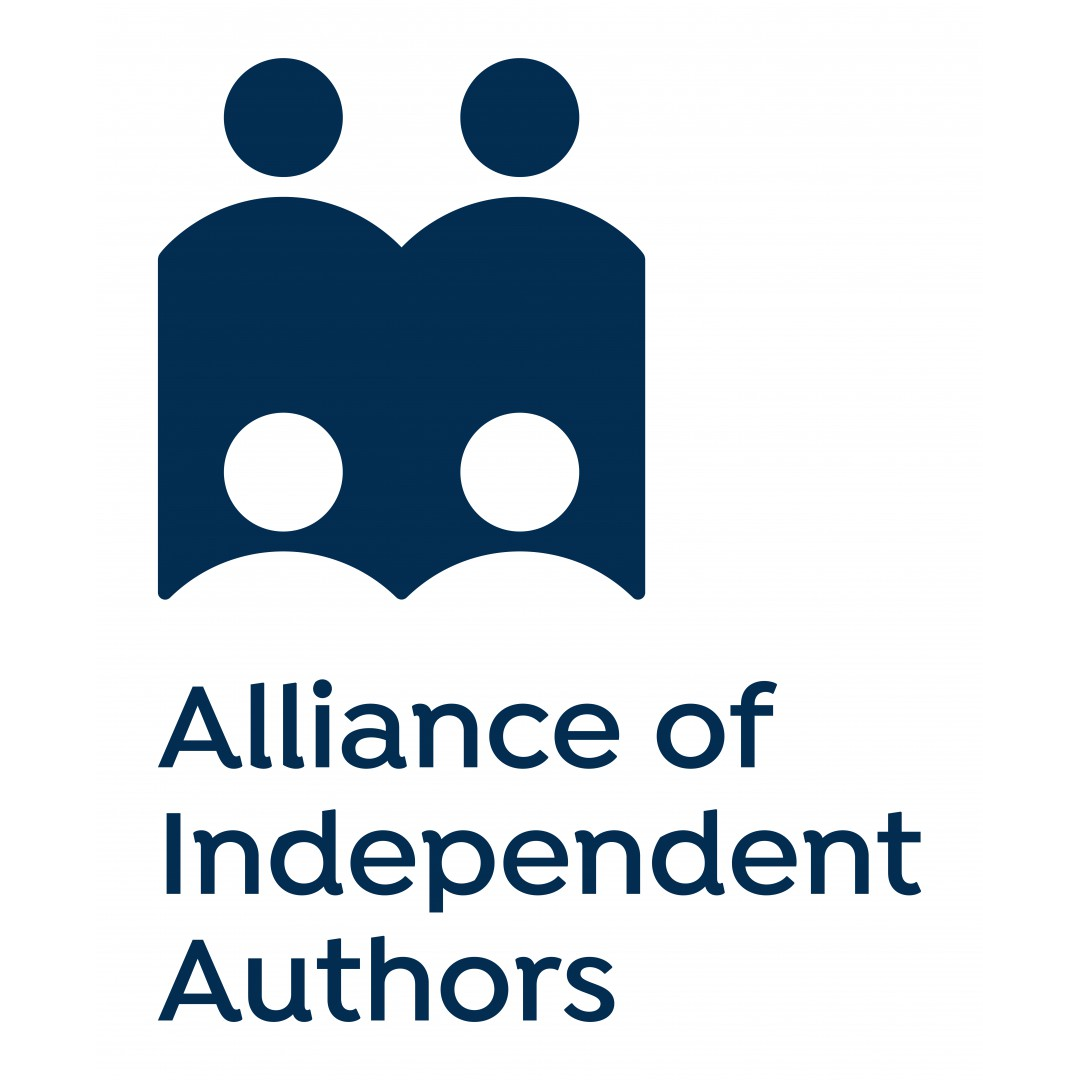
- Formation: 2012
- Headquarters: London
- Region served: International
- Founder and Director: Orna Ross
- Co-Director: Philip Lynch
- Website: www.allianceindependentauthors.org

The Alliance of Independent Authors (often abbreviated to ALLi, pronounced "ally") is a non-profit organisation of independent (or self-published) authors. The organisation was founded at the London Book Fair in 2012, by Orna Ross and Philip Lynch.

== Campaigns ==
The Alliance runs several campaigns on behalf of independent authors. In May 2013 they started the "Open Up To Indies" campaign, which called on literary and book trade organizations to recognize independent authors, allow them to join organizations, enter competitions, etc. In 2014, the campaign was relaunched as "Open Up To Indie Authors" in conjunction with Kobo, with the release of a guidebook, Opening Up to Indie Authors by Debbie Young.

Their watchdog desk identifies and warns authors of services and awards that "overcharge, over-promise, under-deliver, or in any way exploit authors."

In 2014, they launched a self-publishing services directory. All the services were approved and adhered to a code of standards set by the alliance.

Also in 2014, the Alliance launched an "Ethical Author Campaign", which set out guidance on how independent authors should conduct themselves.
