= The Freshmen (band) =

Irish band

The Freshmen were among the most popular Irish showbands of the 1960s and 1970s. They specialised in recreating the complex vocal harmonies of international acts such as The Beach Boys and The 5th Dimension. They had nine top 20 hit singles in Ireland, including a reworking of The Rivingtons' song "Papa Oom Mow Mow", featuring the deep voice of the lead singer, Derek Dean.

== Formation ==
The Freshmen were formed in 1962 in Larne, Co. Antrim in Northern Ireland. The initial line-up changed over the nearly two decades of the band's existence as members came and went. Lead singers early-on included Barney McKeown and Tommy Drennan both of whom left to pursue their own projects, setting the stage for Derek Dean to become the permanent lead singer. Apart from Derek Dean, members included keyboard player, saxophonist, and singer, Billy Brown, who also arranged their trademark vocal harmonies, Damien McElroy (guitar), Torry McGahey (bass), Maurice Henry (saxophone), Sean Mahon (trumpet/trombone), and David McKnight (drums).

The Freshmen supported The Beach Boys on their 1967 Irish tour. At the Belfast gig was a young Rory Gallagher, who later recalled (in conversation with journalist, John Waters) the impression both acts made on him:

The Freshmen, led by Billy Brown and Derek Dean, played first and featured a medley of Beach Boys songs. They were astonishing, Gallagher recalled, singing multiple harmony parts in perfect pitch. When the Beach Boys came on later and sang the same songs, they sounded, by comparison, well . . . rubbish.

== Later years ==
As they matured, The Freshmen moved away from covers and began to record original songs, some written by the band members. In 1970, they undertook their most ambitious project with the release of the six-track concept album, Peace on Earth. The record featured new material from well-known songwriters such as Jimmy Webb, with linking narration by Irish actor, Micheál MacLiammóir. On 11 November 1970, at the RDS in Dublin, the Freshmen performed the entire album live with the RTÉ Light Orchestra conducted by Don Gould. Due to illness, MacLiammóir was unable to take part and his partner, Hilton Edwards, acted as narrator.

The Freshmen's last single before they broke up was the Billy Brown composition, "You've Never Heard Anything Like It", a punk rock parody. Released in 1979, it was named 'single of the week' by the NME, and reached number 17 in the Irish chart.

In September 2010, The Freshmen were among four Irish showbands featured on a special set of commemorative stamps issued by An Post, Ireland's postal service.

== Discography ==
=== Albums ===
- Movin' On (1968), Pye NPL18263
- Peace on Earth (1970), CBS 64099
- Now and Then (1974), Dolphin DOLB 7015
- When Summer Comes - The Pye Anthology (2002), Castle CMRCD 271

=== Irish hit singles ===
- "La Yenka" (October 1965) No. 10
- "Papa Oom Mow Mow" (December 1967) No. 7
- "The Little Old Lady from Pasadena (Go Granny Go)" (August 1968) No. 12
- "Just To See You Smile" (February 1969) No. 9
- "Halfway to Where" (April 1970) No. 10
- "Leaving of Liverpool" (March 1974) No. 5
- "And God Created Woman" (December 1976) No. 3
- "Cinderella" (March 1977) No. 3
- "You've Never Heard Anything Like It" (September 1979) No. 17
