= Watch House Terrace =

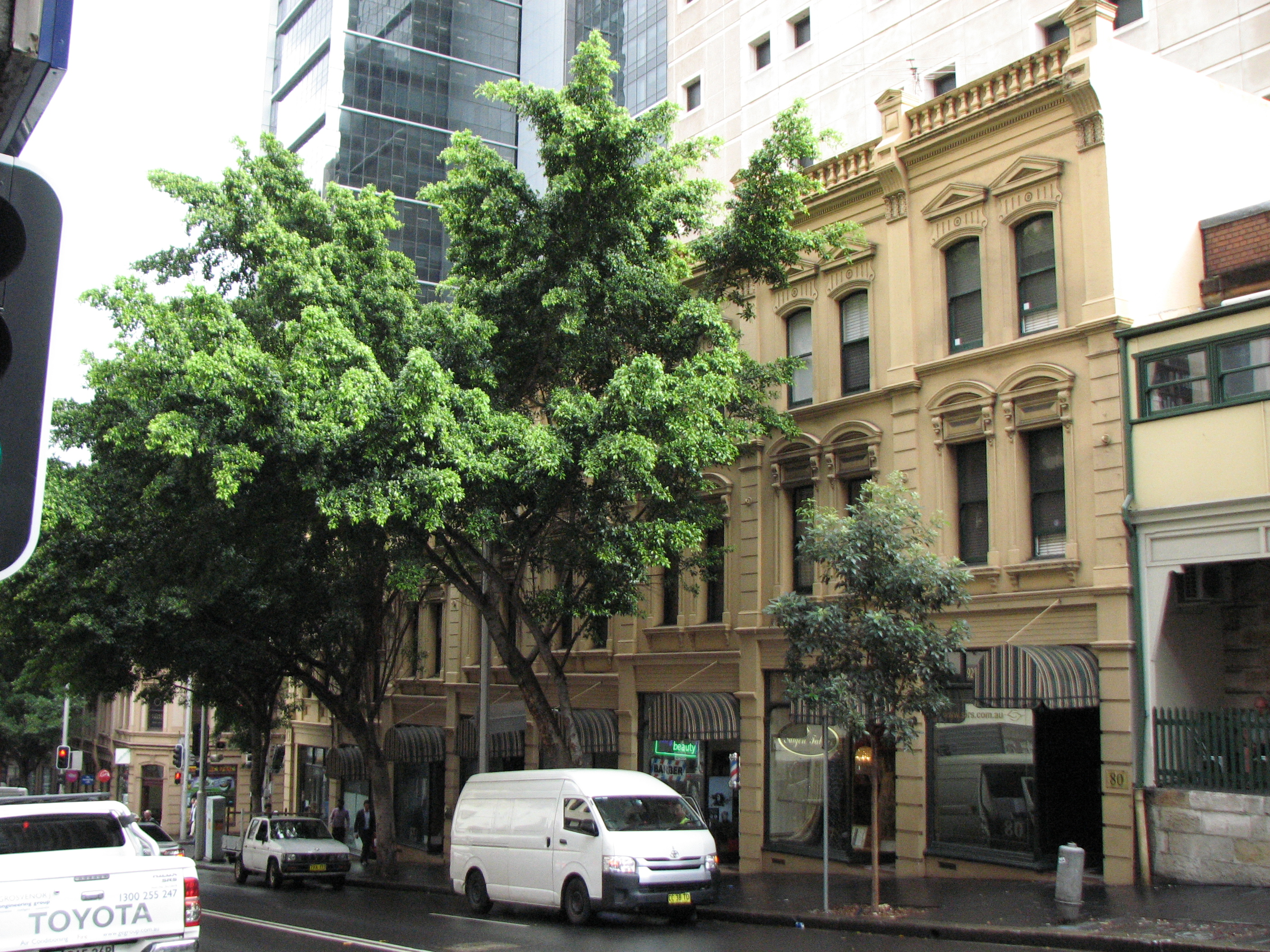
- Watch House Terrace, 66–80 Erskine Street, Sydney, NSW.

- Location within Sydney Location within Australia
- 33.8666°S 151.2046°E
- Location: 66–80 Erskine Street, Sydney, City of Sydney, New South Wales, Australia

New South Wales Heritage Register
- Official name: Watch House Terrace
- Type: state heritage (built)
- Designated: 2 April 1999
- Reference no.: 223
- Type: Terrace
- Category: Residential buildings (private)

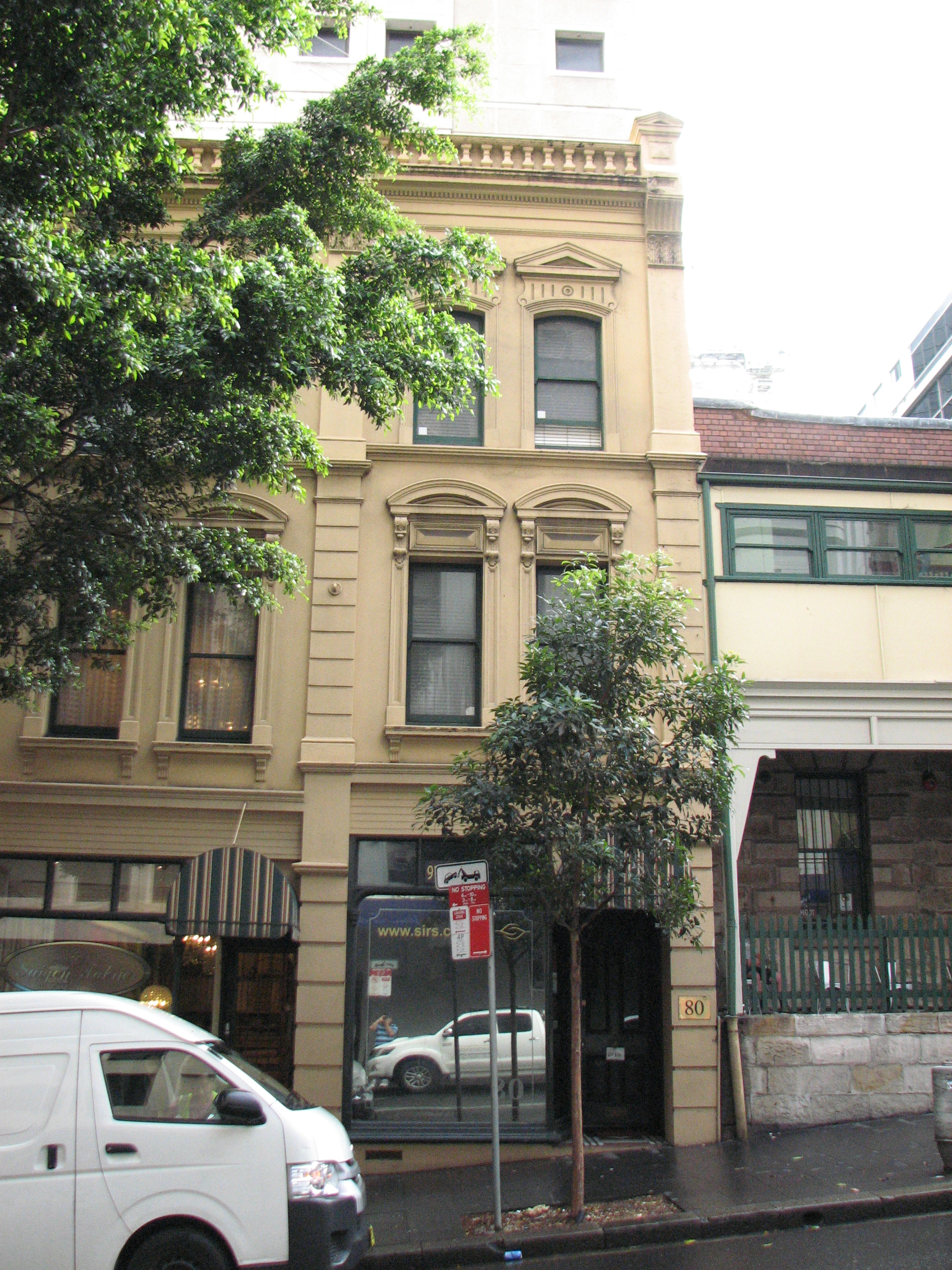
One of the 8 terraces in Watch House Terrace at 66–80 Erskine Street, Sydney, NSW

Watch House Terrace is a heritage-listed row of terraced houses at 66–80 Erskine Street, Sydney, City of Sydney, New South Wales, Australia.

It was added to the New South Wales State Heritage Register on 2 April 1999.

== History ==
It was built by Edmund Blacket in 1854,

== Heritage listing ==
Watch House Terrace was listed on the New South Wales State Heritage Register on 2 April 1999.

== See also ==
- Media related to Watch House Terrace at Wikimedia Commons
