= Watch House Village =

Village in County Wexford, Ireland

Coordinates: 52°41′26″N 6°38′35.6″W

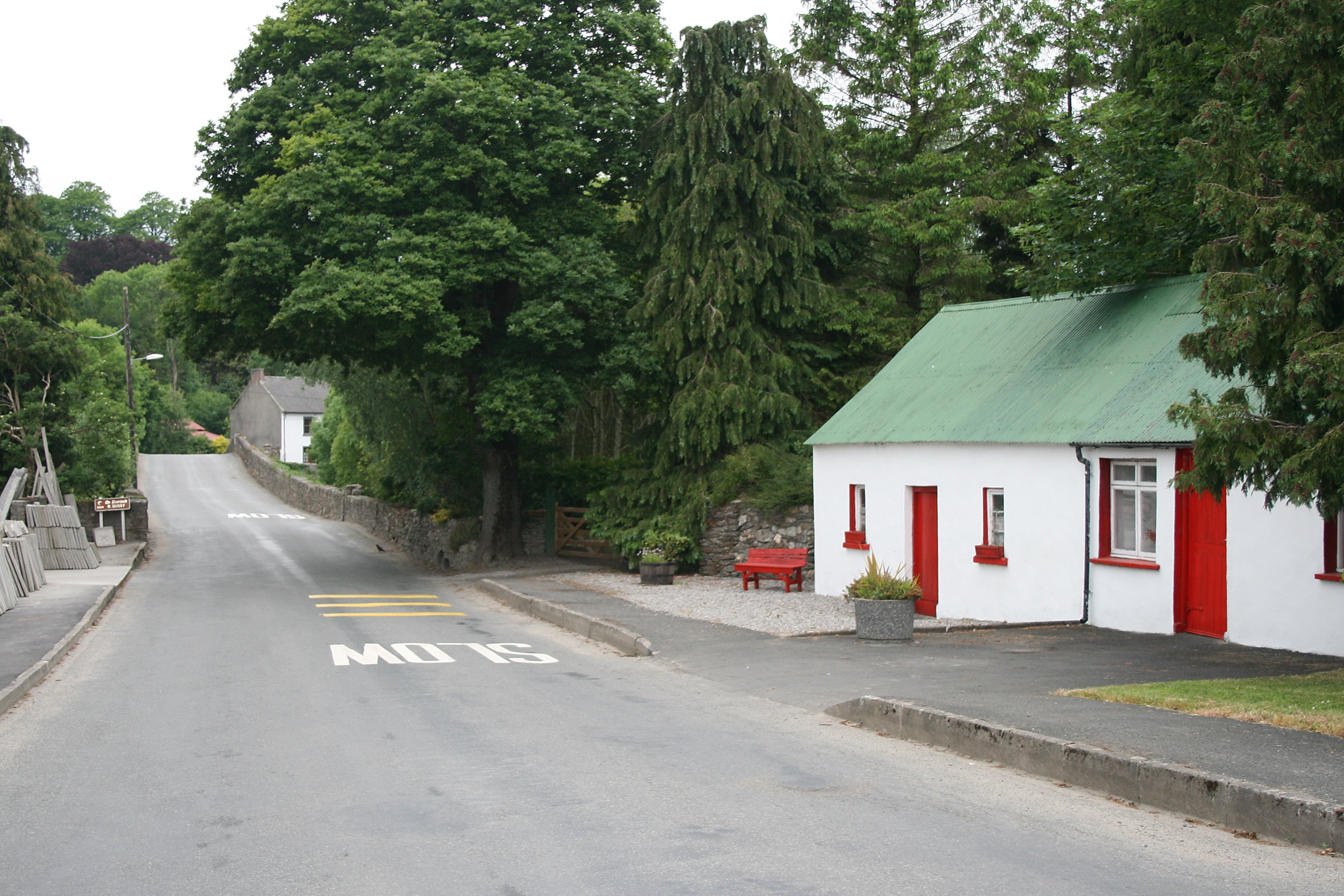
Watch House Village, bridge over the Derry River ahead

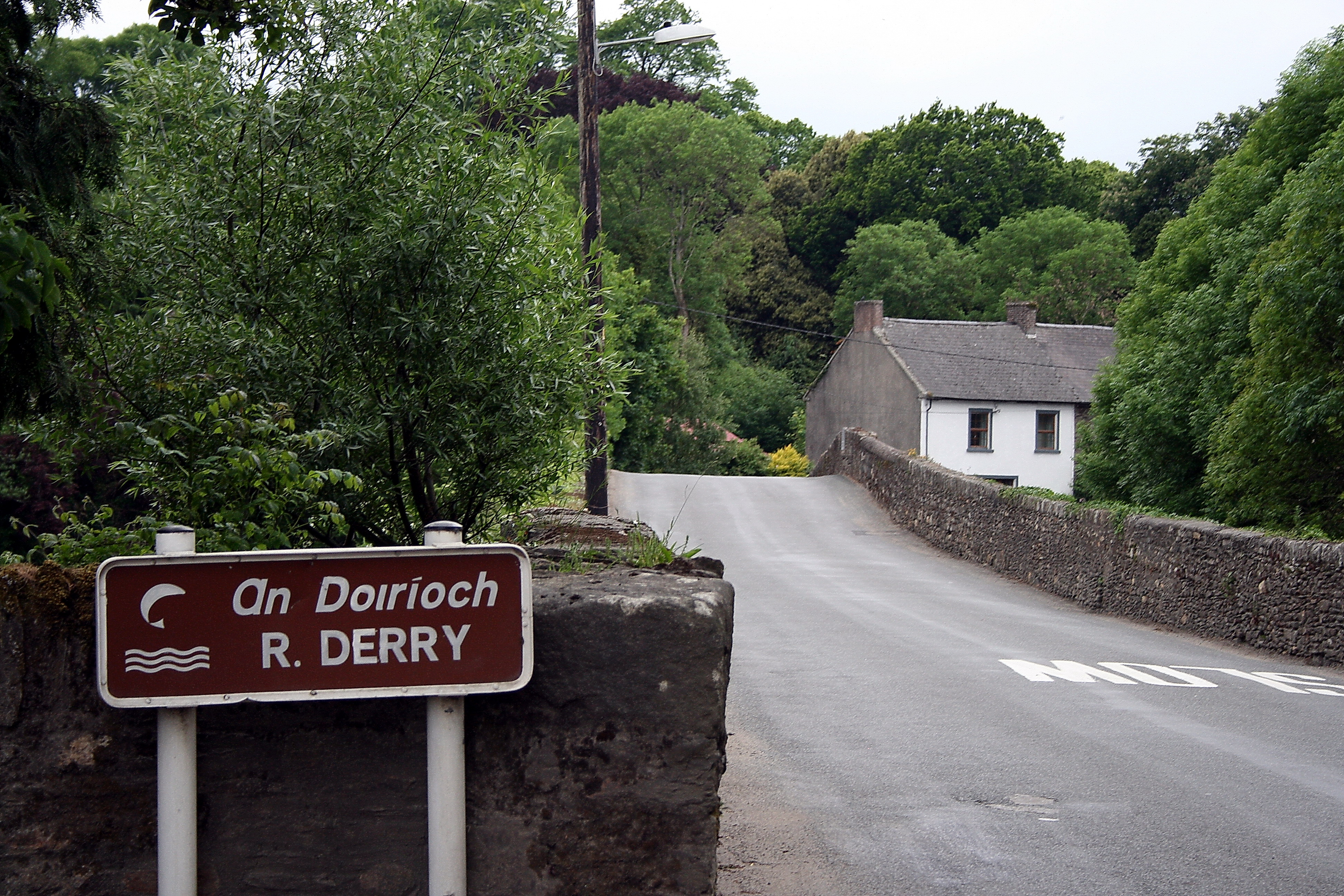
Carlow/Wexford border

Watch House Village is a small village in County Wexford, Ireland. It is a twin village of the much larger Clonegal in County Carlow on the other side of the River Derry, which forms the county boundary. The area takes its name from a military guard hut that was built in the area during the 1798 Rebellion. Clonegall Bridge, which spans the River Derry and connects counties Wexford and Carlow, was built c. 1780.

== See also ==
- List of towns and villages in Ireland
