= Larry Cunningham =

Irish country music singer

- Publicity photo

Background information
- Born: 13 February 1938; Clooneen, Mullinalaghta, County Longford, Ireland
- Died: 28 September 2012 (aged 74); Dublin, Ireland
- Genres: Country and Irish
- Occupation: Singer
- Years active: 1961–2012
- Labels: Dolphin Records
- Website: http://larrycunningham.ie

Larry Cunningham (13 February 1938 – 28 September 2012) was an Irish country music singer, who was one of the leading figures of the showband scene in the 1960s and 1970s. Cunningham accomplished a series of "firsts" during his career. In 1964, Cunningham broke into the British charts with "Tribute to Jim Reeves", the first time an Irish artist had done such a thing.

== Biography ==
Cunningham grew up in the townland of Clooneen in Mullinalaghta parish, near Granard, County Longford, in a farming family of seven children. After leaving school at 16 he went to England and worked as a carpenter, playing Irish traditional music and gaelic football during his spare time. In 1958 he returned to Ireland. Still working as a carpenter, he soon joined the part-time Gowna-based Grafton Showband, but left it in 1961 to become fully professional as the lead singer of the Mighty Avons, based in Cavan. That band initially specialised in covers of Jim Reeves songs and similar country material.

The band's first taste of fame came when they were supporting Jim Reeves during the Irish leg of his European tour in 1963; when Reeves walked off the stage during a concert in Lifford in protest at the poor condition of the supplied piano, the Avons (as they later became popularly called) took over and entertained the crowd, to much subsequent publicity and acclaim.

In December 1964, Cunningham and the Mighty Avons had a Top-10 hit with the song "Tribute to Jim Reeves", which also entered the British charts (the first time for an Irish artiste), and played on Top of the Pops (also an Irish first), which further boosted their career. Their major hit was "Lovely Leitrim" in September 1965, which stayed at number one in the charts for four weeks. As well as regularly touring Ireland to large crowds, the Avons made many appearances on television, and often played in Britain, the US, and other places.

In late 1969, he left the Mighty Avons and merged with Edenderry band The Fairways to form Larry Cunningham and the Country Blue Boys, leaving Gene Stuart to front the Avons. Cunningham continued having success with his new band, but after his marriage in 1972 he gave up regular touring in favour of occasional concerts and recording. He continued to have top-10 hits until the mid-1970s, and still performed occasionally for the remainder of his life. In recent years, audio and video compilations of his music have been released, as well as a biography.

In February 1972, Cunningham married Beatrice Nannery, who worked for him managing a supermarket which he owned. They had four children and two grandchildren. He died on 28 September 2012, following a long period of illness.

== Discography ==
Cunningham and his bands have released the following recordings:

=== Singles ===
Released	Band	Title	Peak chart position
Jan 1965	Mighty Avons	"Tribute to Jim Reeves"	9
Apr 1965	Mighty Avons	"I Guess I'm Crazy"	4
Sep 1965	Mighty Avons	"Lovely Leitrim"	1
Apr 1966	Mighty Avons	"Among the Wicklow Hills"	2
Nov 1966	Mighty Avons	"Snowflake"	2
Feb 1967	Mighty Avons	"Fool's Paradise"	5
Jul 1967	Mighty Avons	"Three Steps to the Phone"	8
Dec 1967	Mighty Avons	"Little Nell"	
Mar 1968	Mighty Avons	"The Emigrant"	10
Nov 1968	Mighty Avons	"The Great El Tigre"	17
May 1969	Mighty Avons	"Bracero"	
Sep 1969	Country Blue Boys	"Ballad of James Connolly"	10
Dec 1969	Country Blue Boys	"Don't Let Me Cross Over"	7
May 1970	Country Blue Boys	"Mother, the Queen of My Heart"	13
Jan 1971	Country Blue Boys	"Pride of the West"	17
Dec 1971	Country Blue Boys	"Slaney Valley"	1
Jul 1972	Country Blue Boys	"Four Great Irish Hits, Volume 1"	4
Oct 1972	Country Blue Boys	"Four Great Irish Hits, Volume 2"	10
Mar 1973	Country Blue Boys	"Goodbye Comes Hard to Me"	5
Jan 1974	Country Blue Boys	"This Time of the Year"	3
Jun 1974	Country Blue Boys	"Lovely Leitrim"	19
1975	Country Blue Boys	"My Kathleen"	3
Dec 1975	solo, with Margo	"Hello Mr. Peters"	15
Sep 1976	Country Blue Boys	"Annaghdown"	6
Apr 1977	Country Blue Boys	"Where the Blue and Lonely Go"	19
1980	Country Blue Boys	"Where the Grass Grows Greenest"	
Jun 1983	Country Blue Boys	"The Story of My Life"	16
Nov 1983	Country Blue Boys	"Galway and You"	30
Aug 1984	Country Blue Boys	"Walk On By"	26

=== Albums ===
Released	Band	Title
Jan 1967	solo	Two Sides of Larry
Dec 1967	solo	Larry Cunningham Sings Country and Irish
Jun 1969	solo	Ramblin' Irishman
May 1970	Country Blue Boys	Country My Way
1970	Country Blue Boys	This is Larry Cunningham
1972	Country Blue Boys	Songs Fresh from Nashville
1973	Country Blue Boys	Larry Cunningham in Concert
1974	Country Blue Boys	Tribute to Jim Reeves
1980	Country Blue Boys	Come Back to Erin
