= Orna Ross =

Irish author and literary agent (born 1960)

- Ross in 2024
- Born: Aine McCarthy; Waterford, Ireland
- Education: University College Dublin
- Occupation: Author
- Website: www.ornaross.com

Aine McCarthy (born 1960) is an Irish author who writes under the pen name Orna Ross. A former university lecturer, she is an advocate for "creativism", a term she coined about "the conscious application of creative principles to everything in life". She is the founder of the Alliance of Independent Authors, a professional association for authors who self-publish, and has been named one of the 100 most influential people in publishing by The Bookseller, a UK publishing trade magazine.

== Early life ==
Ross was born in Waterford, Ireland and was raised in Murrintown, County Wexford. She attended Murrintown National School and Loreto Convent, Wexford. She completed two degrees at University College Dublin, including a bachelor's degree in English literature and a master's degree in gender studies. She worked for some years as a lecturer in culture and creativity studies at University College Dublin, teaching a creative and imaginative practice course that forms the basis of her Go Creative! book series.

== Career ==
=== Writing career ===
Ross published her first two nonfiction books under the byline Áine McCarthy with feminist publishing house Attic Press, Dublin: Body Matters for Women (1989) and Get Up and Go - a Travel Survival Guide for Women (1992). She published her novels, A Lover's Hollow and A Dance in Time, with Penguin Books.

In 2011, she took her rights back to self-publish her own work, changing the titles to: After the Rising and Before the Fall. Since then, Ross has self-published other works under her imprint Font Publications, like her standalone novel Blue Mercy. Ross published a double special edition work titled Secret Rose as a tribute to W. B. Yeats in 2015 which compiles Yeats' The Secret Rose (1897) and Ross' Her Secret Rose (2015).

That same year, Ross contributed a volume to Outside the Box: Women Writing Women. She collaborated on the box set of novels with six other female writers. Ross' fiction is often set in her home country of Ireland and have won awards such as the CAP Carousel Award and Goethe Grand Prize (2021).

Ross has published poetry collections, including a gift series for special occasions, each collection on a different topic: motherhood, love, loss and new beginnings. Her work Allowing Now won a Gold Literary Titan Book Award.

Ross also practises and writes about the concept of "creativism", a term she coined to explain and explore the conscious application of creative principles to everything in life.

=== Alliance of Independent Authors ===
Ross believes strongly in the benefits of self-publishing for authors both established and just starting out in their careers. In 2012, she launched the Alliance of Independent Authors (ALLi), a not-for-profit organization that aims to protect the rights of writers and promote self-published books.

In her capacity as the head of ALLi, she has advised the BBC on publishing costs for an independent author. In 2014, she was referred to by The Guardian as an "indie star" of the writing world, and featured on the Guardian Books Podcast. In 2020 she joined the London Book Fair Advisory Board.

== Works and appearances ==
=== Fiction ===
- Lovers' Hollow, Penguin, 2005
- A Dance in Time, Penguin, 2008
- After the Rising, Font Publications, 2012
- Before the Fall, Font Publications, 2012
- Blue Mercy, Font Publications, 2013
- After The Rising & Before The Fall, Font Publications, 2014
- Outside the Box: Women Writing Women, Orna Ross and Joni Rodgers, 2015
- Secret Rose, Font Publications, 2015
- Her Secret Rose, Font Publications, 2016
- An Irish Fiction Omnibus, Font Publications, 2017
- After The Rising and Before The Fall, Centenary Edition, Font Publications, 2020

=== Poetry ===
- Ten Thoughts About Love, Font Publications, 2011
- Poetry for Christmas & Other Beginnings, An Anthology, Font Publications, 2012
- Long Light, Font Publications, 2013
- Ten More Thoughts About Love, Font Publications, 2013
- Ten More Thoughts About Love 2, Font Publications, 2013
- Selected Poetry, Font Publications, 2012 - 2014
- Poetry for Christmas: Twelve Inspirational Poems for the Holiday Season, Font Publications, 2013
- Poetry IV, The Font, Font Publications, 2016
- Poetry V, Welcome Dear Guest, Font Publications, 2018
- Keepers: Selected Inspirational Poetry, Font Publications, 2018
- First Flush: Sample Inspirational Poetry, Font Publications, 2019
- Allowing Now: A Book of Mindfulness Poetry, Font Publications, 2019
- Bright Star: Inspirational Poetry for Christmas and Other Beginnings, Font Publications, 2021
- Night Light As It Rises, Inspirational Poetry for Hard Times, Font Publications, 2022
- Circle of Life, Inspirational Poetry for Mothers and Other Carers, Font Publications, 2022
- The Light of Love, Inspirational Poetry for Valentines and Other Lovers, Font Publications, 2023
- Dancing in the Wind, Font Publications

=== Nonfiction ===
- F-R-E-E Writing Notebook: A Go! Creative Tool. Font Publications, 2013
- Opening Up To Indie Authors: A Guide for Bookstores, Libraries, Reviewers, Literary Event Organisers ... and Self-Publishing Writers, Alliance for Independent Authors, 2013 (with Dan Holloway and Debbie Young)
- Choosing A Self Publishing Service 2014: The Alliance of Independent Authors Guide. Alliance for Independent Authors, 2014 (with Mick Rooney and GiacomoGiammatteo)
- A Compendium For Creativists: How To Apply Creative Principles to Life: An Anthology, Font Publications, 2015
- Creative Self-Publishing (3rd Edition), 2023
- SelfPub3: Author Business Campaign, 2023
- Go Creative! Planning Workbook for Authors & Poets, 2023
- Go Creative! Monthly Mapping for Authors & Poets, 2023
- Go Creative! Quarterly Review & Forecast for Authors & Poets, 2023
- How Authors Sell Publishing Rights (2nd Edition), 2024
