= Carlton Cinema, Dublin =

Former cinema in Dublin, Ireland

Carlton Cinema
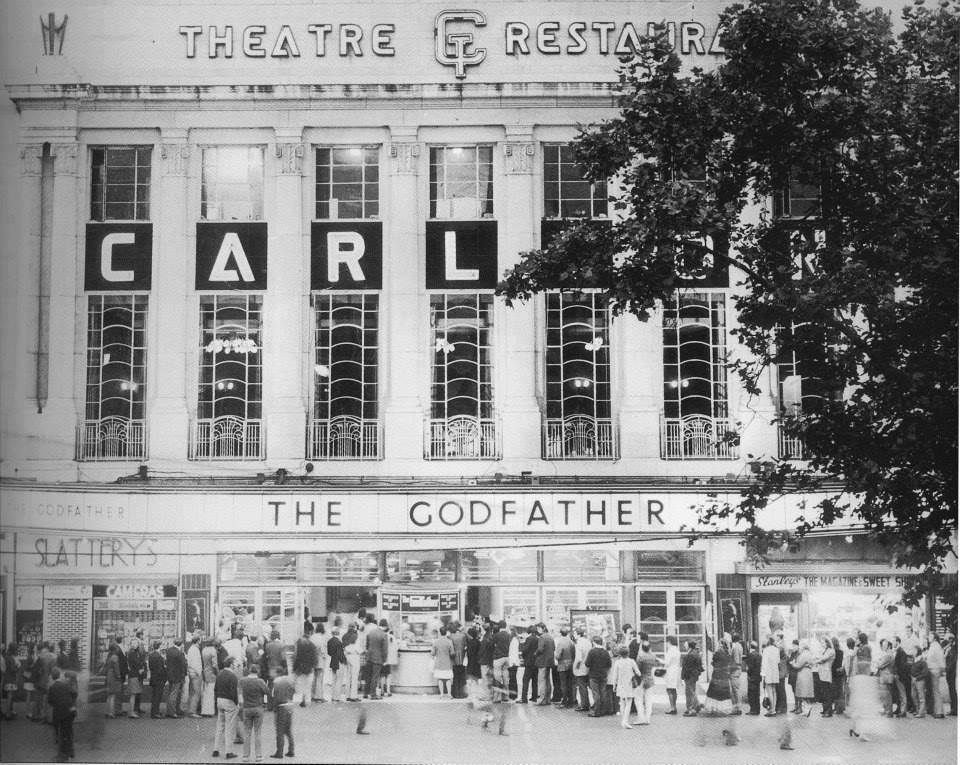
- The screening of The Godfather, c. 1972
- Interactive map of Carlton Cinema
- Address: 52-4 Upper O'Connell Street; Dublin; Ireland
- Coordinates: 53.350975°N 6.261194°W
- Owner: Transport Infrastructure Ireland
- Capacity: 2,000
- Type: Cinema
- Screen: 4
- Current use: XD-FX Cinema

Construction
- Opened: 16 April 1938
- Closed: 20 October 1994
- Architects: Robinson & Keefe

The Carlton Cinema is a former cinema located on the west side of Upper O'Connell Street in Dublin, Ireland opposite the Savoy Cinema. It opened on 16 April 1938 and closed on 20 October 1994.

== History ==
The cinema opened on 16 April 1938. with the first film, The Awful Truth. It was built on the site of the first Carlton Cinema (1915–1936) and was designed by architects Robinson & Keefe.

It was built in Art Deco style. Inside, the decoration relied principally on the use of paint and lighting, but two large displays with a musical instrument motif were formed by twenty panels on either side of the screen. There was seating for 1,500 in the stalls and 500 in the circle. A stage and dressing room were also included in the design.

In 1956, the cinema held the European premiere of Rock Around the Clock and it played to packed houses for three weeks. The cinema received the nickname "the House of Horror" due to the number of horror films shown there. In 1959, it was taken over by Associated British Cinemas (ABC) and in the late 1960s it was taken over by EMI. Many concerts were held on the stage in the 1970s, from performers such as Duke Ellington, Cleo Lane, Johnny Cash, James Last, Fats Domino, Nana Mouskouri, Rory Gallagher, Marlene Dietrich, and Don McLean.

The cinema was last taken over by MGM, and was subdivided into three screens, and later a fourth screen was added where the cinema restaurant was. It closed on 20 October 1994; two of the final films screened were Singin' in the Rain and Rock Around the Clock.

Since then, it has been the subject of court battles to redevelop the site and in 2003 was compulsorily purchased by the city council to facilitate a new project on the site, and an adjoining area, which has been vacant since 1976. It is proposed the site be incorporated into the redevelopment of the O'Connell and Moore Street areas.

The ground floor of the cinema is in use by the adjoining Dr Quirkey's Goodtime Emporium.

The site of the former cinema was owned by Hammerson and part of a larger redevelopment plan for the area prior to July 2026, when it was acquired by Transport Infrastructure Ireland for use as the MetroLink station on O'Connell Street.

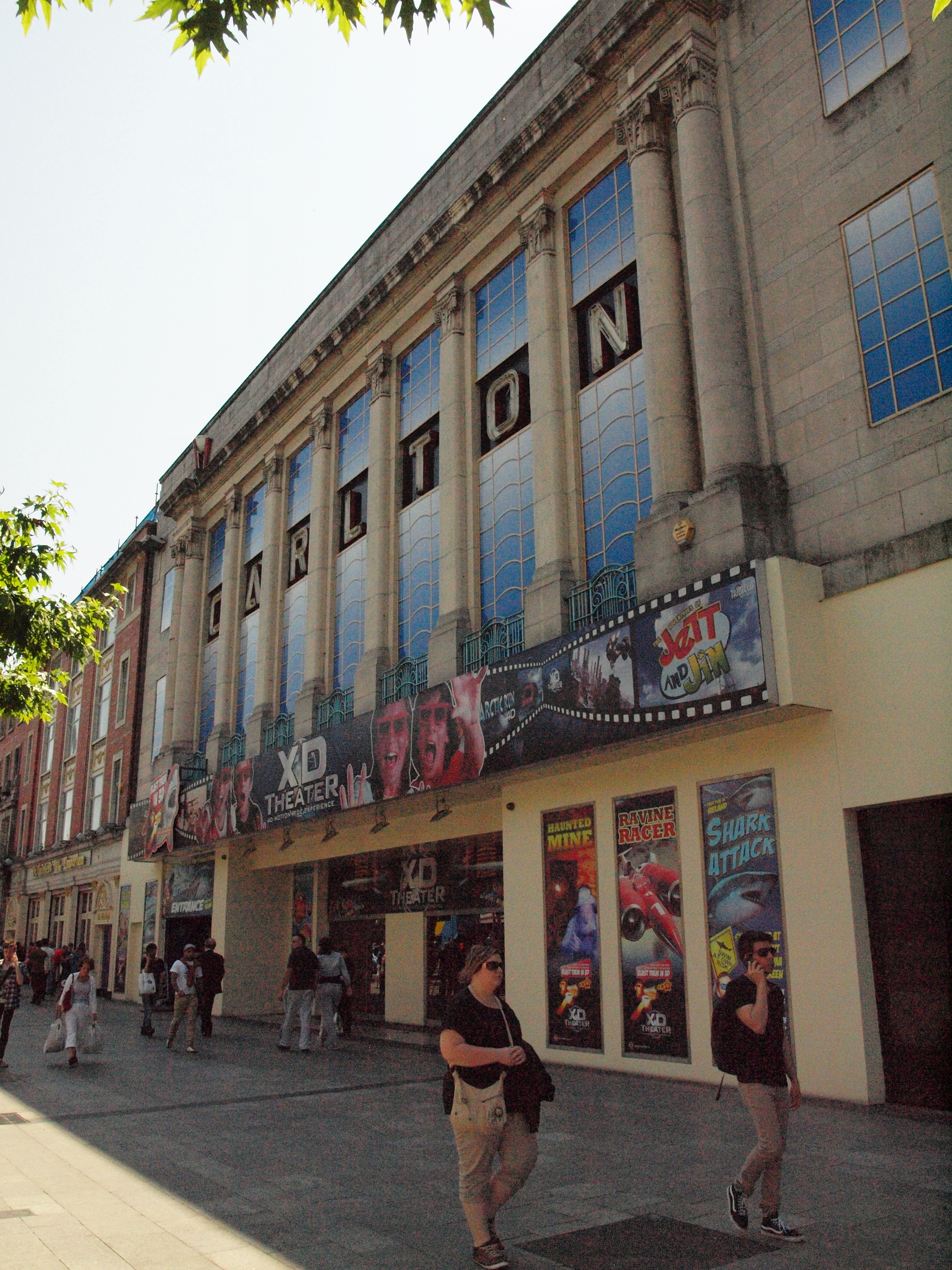
Carlton Cinema, Dublin in 2014
