= Butch Moore =

Irish musical artist

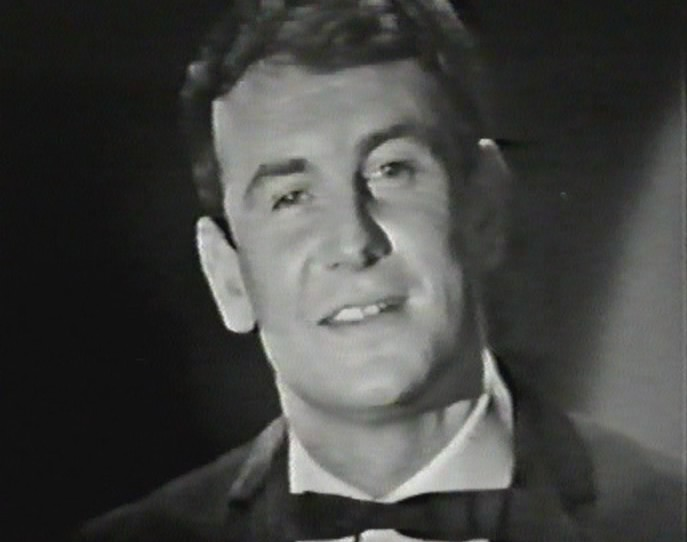
- Moore at Eurovision

Background information
- Born: James Augustine Moore; 10 January 1938; Dublin, Ireland
- Died: 3 April 2001 (aged 63) United States
- Occupation: Singer
- Instrument: Vocals

James Augustine "Butch" Moore (10 January 1938 – 3 April 2001) was an Irish singer and a showband icon during the 1960s.

Moore was born in Dublin, Ireland. He achieved celebrity status as Ireland's first contestant in the Eurovision Song Contest in 1965 and attracted huge crowds with The Capitol Showband in the State's many ballrooms. Moore was at the height of his success, when he won the National Song Contest to represent Ireland in the Eurovision Song Contest 1965, in Naples, singing Walking the Streets in the Rain. The song reached number one on the Irish Singles Chart, but failed to chart in the UK.

Butch Moore married Norah Sheridan (born June 1940) in 1962. They had 3 three children; Karen, Grainne and Gary.

He played with a number of bands before securing his big break with The Capitol Showband in 1958. Its line-up included band leader, Des Kelly, and Paddy Cole, with an early songwriter for the band was Phil Coulter. The Capitol Showband achieved a considerable degree of success in the early 1960s. It toured America in 1961, and two years later became the first showband to appear on the new RTÉ television service. The Capitol Showband played in the London Palladium in 1964 on a night when the lineup included Roy Orbison.

In 1965, The Capitol Showband recorded and issued the single "Born to Be with You" b/w "Far, Far Away". The single did not enter the Billboard Hot 100, but peaked at number twenty-six on the Bubbling Under Hot 100 Singles chart.

As the lead singer with The Capitol Showband, he rivalled the Royal Showband's Brendan Bowyer as Ireland's most popular showband vocalist. His marriage to Norah broke down in 1969 and when his career went into a decline, he emigrated to the United States in 1970, where he spent the last 31 years of his life.

Butch Moore married Irish ballad singer Maeve Mulvany (born 1945) in 1972 in the United States. They formed a very successful group known as "Butch and Maeve" with a mixture of ballads and pop. They also owned a pub in Massachusetts named after a song they sang "The Parting Glass". They had three children, Rory, Tara and Thomas. Butch died of a heart attack at his home in the United States on 3 April 2001, at age 63. Maeve died on 14 February 2004; she had planned to move back to Ireland where she had bought a house in Cormeen, County Meath.

Awards and achievements
Preceded by Debut entry	Ireland in the Eurovision Song Contest; 1965	Succeeded by Dickie Rock with "Come Back to Stay"
