= Irish showband =

Type of musical group

- Native name: seó-bhanna
- Stylistic origins: rock and roll, country and western, dixieland jazz, céilí Bigband
- Cultural origins: Ireland, 1950s–80s
- Typical instruments: drums, lead guitar, bass guitar, keyboard instrument, trumpet, saxophone, trombone, and clarinet

The Irish showband (Irish: seó-bhanna) was a dance band format popular in Ireland from the 1950s to the 1980s, with its peak in the 1960s. These bands typically had seven to ten members, including a rhythm section and a brass section with various combinations of trumpet, saxophone, and trombone, and were fronted by lead singers. Some included comedy skits in their shows.

Their repertoire included rock and roll, country and western, Dixieland jazz, big band tunes, Irish Céilí dances, Latin, folk, and more. Showbands were noted for the energy they brought to live performances, their chart-topping covers, and sometimes choreographed performances. Many such bands toured in Ireland, and some of the successful ones later performed in Britain, the US, Canada, on the German nightclub circuit, and on U.S. military bases in Europe.

== History ==
=== 1940s–1950s: Big Band Era ===
In the 1940s and 1950s, popular dance bands in Ireland usually had ten to fifteen musicians, sometimes more, and were known as dance bands or dance orchestras. They customarily wore dress suits and dickey bows. Often the orchestra members had learned to play their instruments in their community's brass band. Orchestras sat down to play and read their parts from sheet music on music stands.

Instrumental dance music was their main focus, providing the backdrop to a night of dancing that might be five hours long (e.g., 9 PM to 2 AM).

Amplification was limited at first; most dance bands made use of just one microphone to allow a vocalist to be heard above the large band. As technology improved and became more available, orchestras started using microphones for each section, more powerful amplifiers, and larger loudspeakers.

=== Big bands turn into showbands ===
As singing and singers became more popular and instrumental tunes less popular, the orchestras downsized and morphed into showbands, going from eight or ten brass down to three or four brass. The Maurice Mulcahy Orchestra went from fifteen members in the early sixties (five saxophones, four trumpets, one trombone, rhythm section and a singer) to ten members in the early seventies, which included two singers but still held four saxophones and one trumpet, a large brass section for the seventies.

There were a few bands that changed their name from dance bands and orchestras to 'Bandshow' before calling themselves 'Showbands'. For example, The Jimmy Wiley Orchestra changed its name to The Jimmy Wiley Bandshow and then to The Jimmy Wiley Showband.

Dave Glover renamed his group to the Dave Glover Showband in 1955, pioneering the use of the word "showband"; he chose the name because he wanted to indicate that their act incorporated both music and skits.

Strabane's Clipper Carlton are credited with being the first to incorporate a 'show' in the middle of their act, 'Duke Box Saturday Night', where they imitated the hits and singers of the day. Fronted by Fergus O'Hagan, they were originally a touring dance orchestra. They later became popular in Britain and on the U.S. and Canadian circuit of Irish clubs.

=== Showbands ===
Brendan Bowyer, Tom Dunphy and the Royal Showband from Waterford toured professionally around 1958, and became a crowd-drawing success. They were managed by promoter T. J. Byrne, and were the first such band to have a record enter the Irish charts, "Katie Daly", sung by Dunphy. Soon after, Brendan Bowyer had a hit with "Kiss Me Quick", a song taken from an Elvis Presley album. Many would consider Brendan Bowyer the "king" of the showband era, for his powerful and attractive voice, his handsome good looks, and his energetic dance moves on stage. The Capitol Showband released the first showband L.P. record in 1962, 'Presenting Ireland's Premier Showband', Envoy Records, VOY 9144.

The Freshmen from Ballymena, Antrim, led by Billy Brown and Derek Dean, covered hits by The Beach Boys and Jan and Dean.

Dickie Rock performed mainly big ballads. First singing with Dublin's Strykers, Blackbirds, Echoes and Melochords, he became a star with The Miami Showband, and in 1966 represented Ireland in the Eurovision Song Contest.

At the height of the showband period in the mid-1960s, there were as many as 800 full- and part-time bands travelling the country. The business as a whole employed many thousands of musicians, support staff and managers.

=== Embracing rock and soul ===
A second wave of bands emerged in the late 1960s and early 1970s with personnel coming mostly from the beat-groups scene. They were young proponents of a rock, blues and soul style. These bands included The Dreams, The Real McCoy, The Arrows and The Chessmen. They were most popular in urban areas, while Country and Western leaning bands were generally more popular in the rural areas of the country. Johnny McEvoy and Danny Doyle started out as folk singers but changed to showbands in the 1970s. They subsequently returned to the folk scene after a relatively short period.

=== Decline of the showbands ===
By the mid-1970s the phenomenon had peaked, and was in decline. A number of factors contributed to their drop in popularity, including the advent of upscale discothèque, the opening of hotel music lounges and cabaret rooms with alcohol licenses, and changing musical tastes. The big bands started employing smaller bands, known as relief bands, to play before them. People often stayed in the pub, ignoring the fact that the relief band was playing, and waited until the main band was about to come on stage before going into the ballroom. Bands were less and less successful at drawing people out of the pub at all. Some tried changing names and coming up with gimmicks to try to attract people.

Some of the bigger bands started demanding a guaranteed fee no matter what the attendance would be. Some even demanded a percentage of the door takings from the ballroom operator, the amount depending on how popular the band were. It became riskier for ballroom operators to run dances and make a profit with falling attendances and increased fee demands from bands.

In July 1975 members of the Ulster Volunteer Force murdered three members of The Miami Showband, Fran O'Toole, Tony Geraghty and Brian McCoy. Two others were wounded, Des McAlea and Stephen Travers. The killings, which occurred as the band was returning from a show in Banbridge in Northern Ireland, became known as the Miami Showband killings. Cross-border band touring dropped significantly as a result, hastening the general decline of the showbands. Of the bands that did not break up entirely, many reduced their numbers and were revamped into small outfits that only played locally.

== Ballrooms and dance halls ==
The city ballrooms were often purpose built and lavish. Many rural dance halls, on the other hand, were simple buildings at the edge of the town. Dance halls in smaller towns and villages would host a dance once or twice a month. The fans often travelled miles from the surrounding countryside to see their favourite band. A chain of venues in the midlands was operated by Albert Reynolds, who would later become Taoiseach of the Republic. Associated Ballrooms was owned by mining magnate Con Hynes. The Lucey brothers had large ballrooms in Cork. In the North East, the Adelphi ballroom, owned by Dee O'Kane and Jimmy Hamilton in Dundalk, attracted audiences from both sides of the border. Summer dancing was held in marquee tents during parish carnivals throughout the country. Mineral Bars dispensed hot beverages and soft drinks. Ballrooms and dance halls did not sell alcoholic beverages. Alcohol sales remained the prerogative of the local pub, who then began to build extensions onto pubs and operate their own disco or cabaret show.

== Legacy ==
Various internationally successful Irish singers and musicians began their careers in showbands, including Van Morrison, Henry McCullough, Mick Hanly, Rory Gallagher, Eric Bell, Eric Wrixon and Colm Wilkinson.

The 1987 Roddy Doyle novel The Commitments is about a contemporary group of unemployed Irish youths who start a soul band in the manner of the late-1960s Irish showbands. The novel spawned a popular 1991 film of the same name, which in turn led to a touring band, The Stars from the Commitments, and a 2013 musical, The Commitments.

The 2005 Irish TV movie Showbands and its 2006 sequel, Showbands II, both starred Liam Cunningham as the manager of a struggling Irish showband in the mid-1960s.

In 2010, Ireland's postal service, An Post, issued a set of four commemorative stamps depicting four of Ireland's biggest showbands: The Drifters, The Freshmen, The Miami Showband and The Royal Showband. An An Post spokesman said that the showbands "rocked Irish society from its postwar depression".

In March 2019, Ardal O'Hanlon presented a BBC Four documentary about the showband phenomenon.
