= Kilkenny =

City in Leinster, Ireland

Kilkenny Cill Chainnigh (Irish)
- City
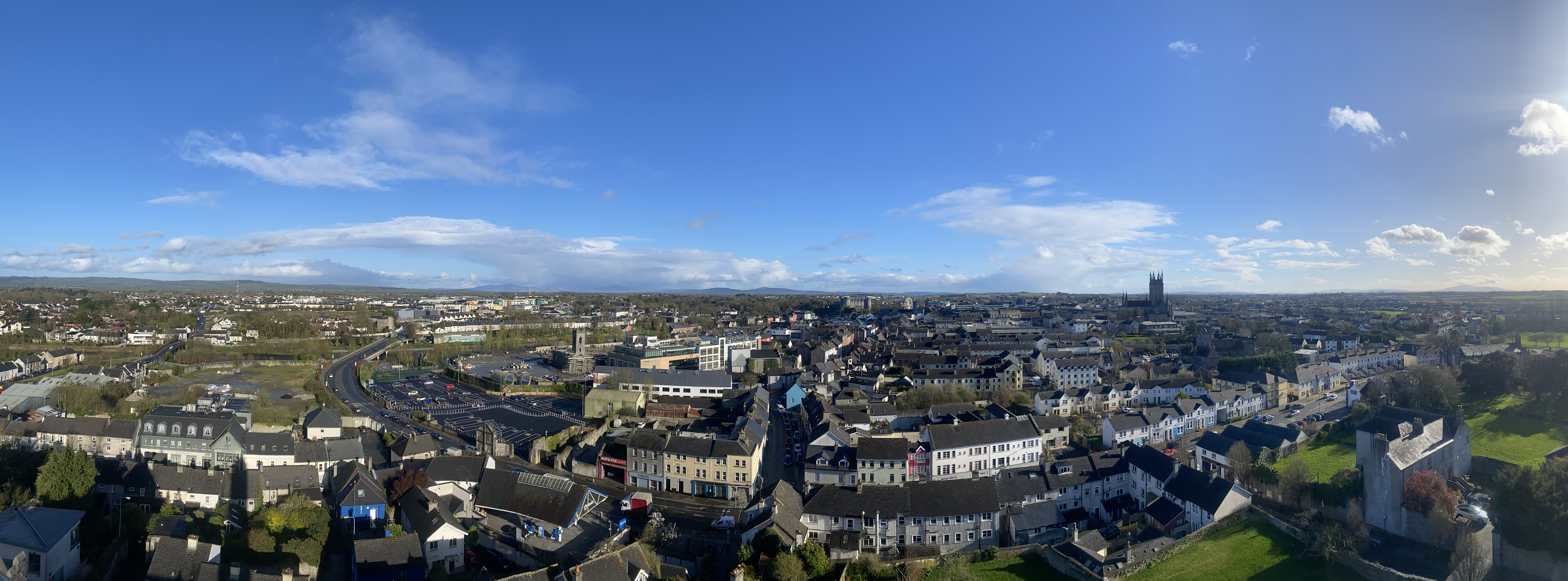
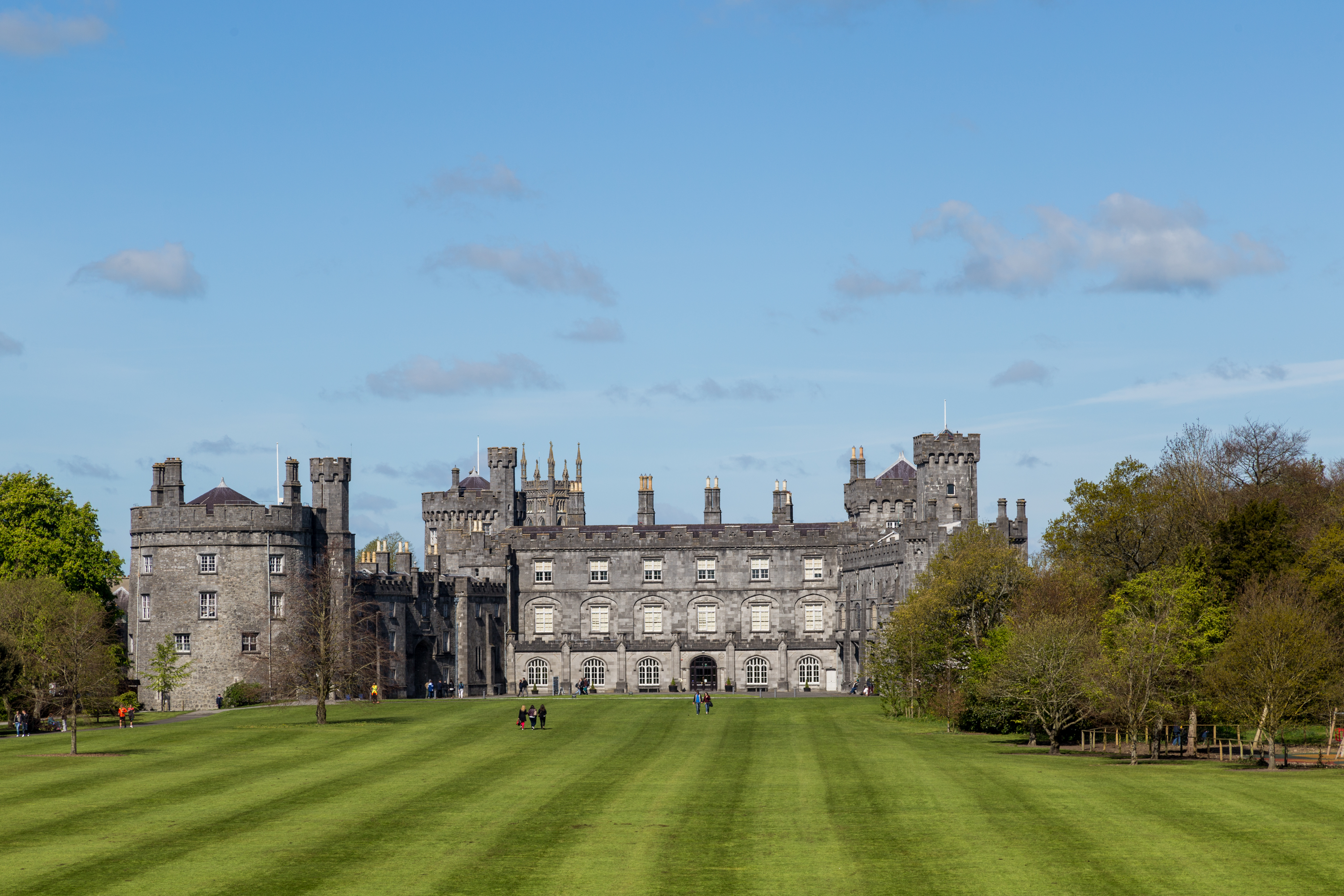
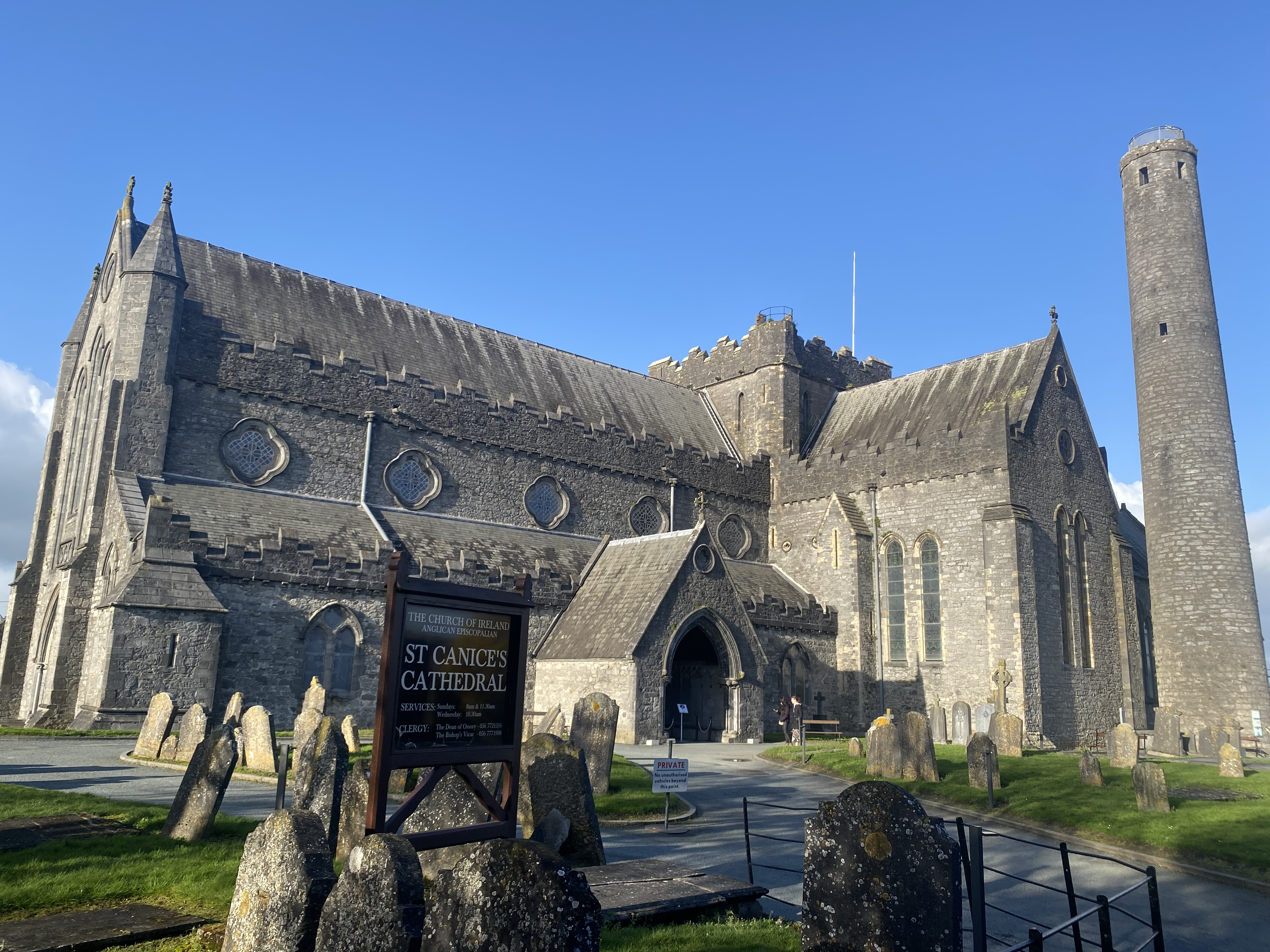
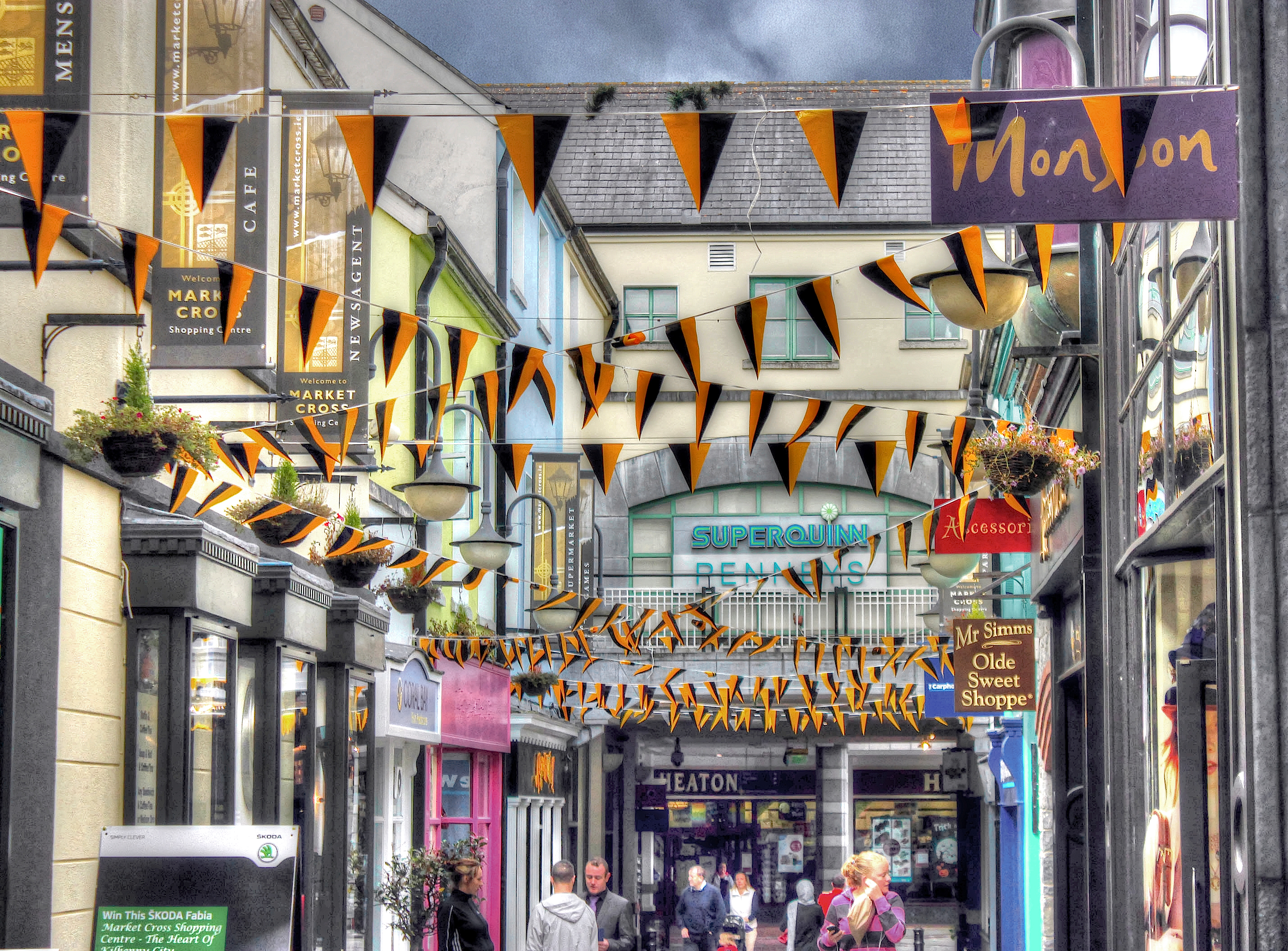
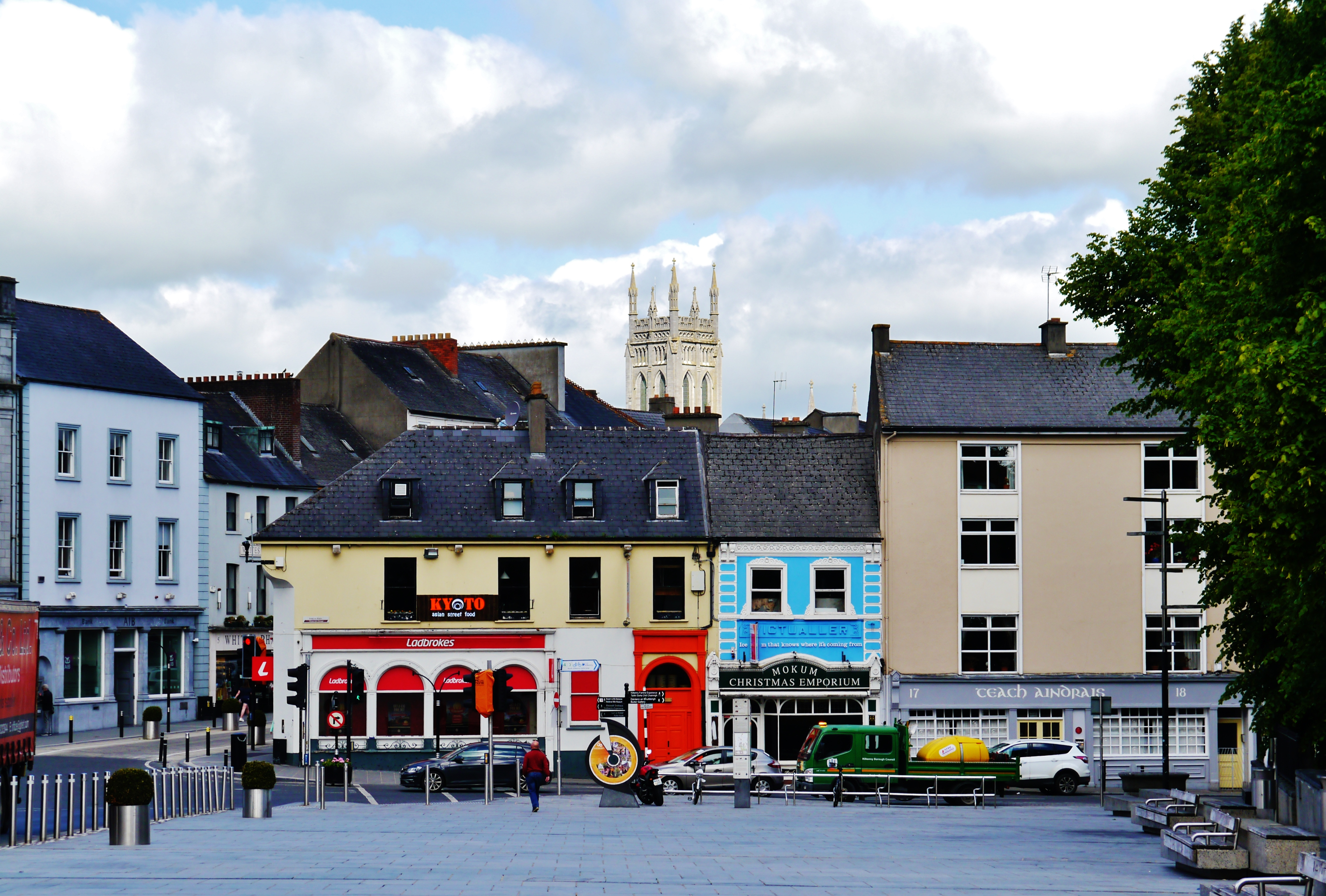
- City skyline Kilkenny Castle St Canice's Cathedral Market Cross Shopping Centre The Parade

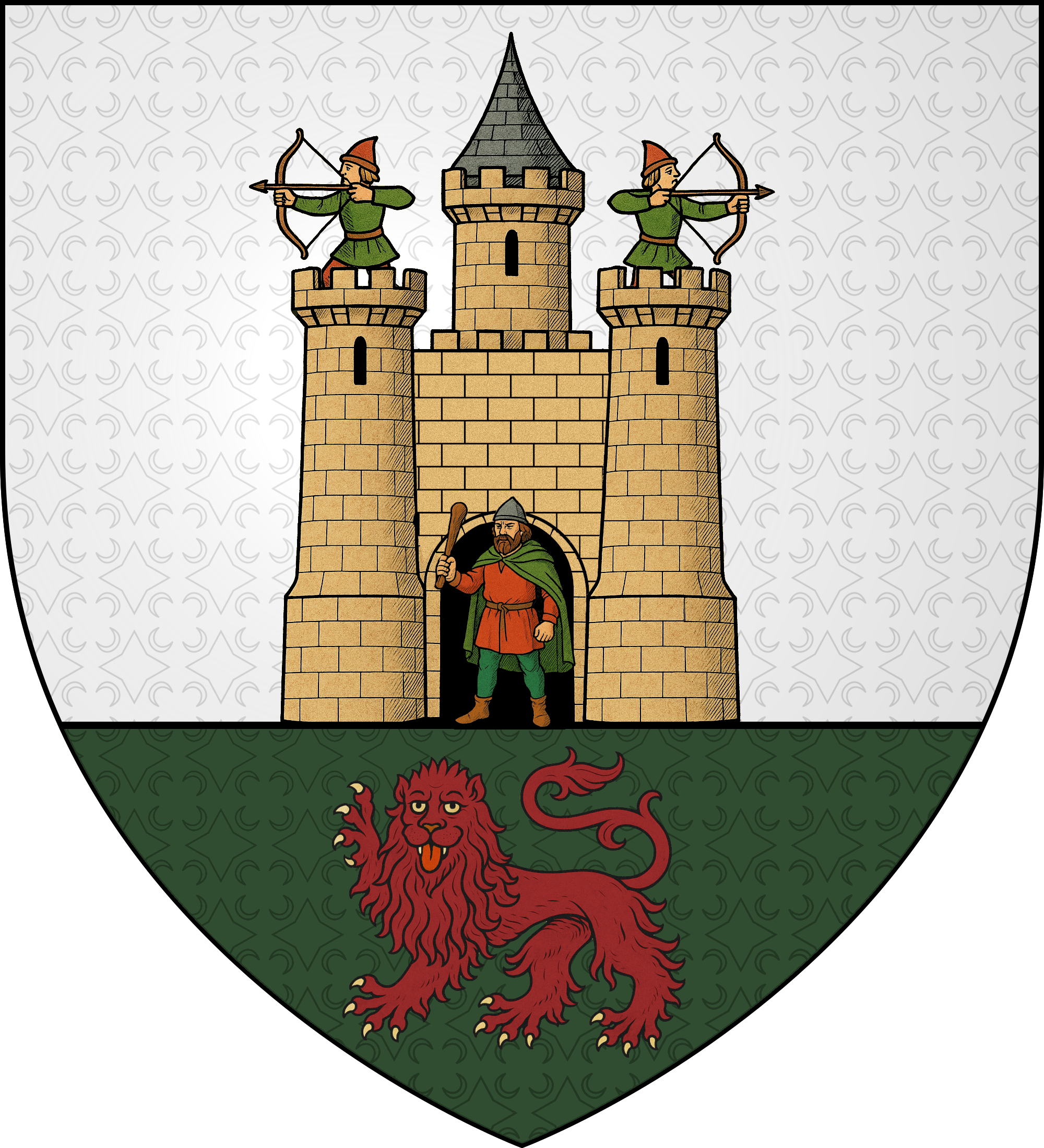
- Coat of arms
- Nickname: The Marble City
- Location in Ireland Kilkenny (Europe)
- Coordinates: 52°39′2″N 7°15′5″W
- Country: Ireland
- Province: Leinster
- County: Kilkenny

Government
  - Local authority: Kilkenny County Council
  - Dáil constituency: Carlow–Kilkenny
  - European Parliament: South
- Elevation: 60 m (200 ft)

Population (2022)
  - Total: 27,184
  - Rank: 13th
- Time zone: UTC±0 (WET)
  - Summer (DST): UTC+1 (IST)
- Eircode routing key: R95
- Telephone area code: +353(0)56
- Irish Grid Reference: S506563
- Website: Official website

Kilkenny (Irish: Cill Chainnigh [ˌciːl̠ʲ ˈxan̠ʲəj], meaning 'church of Cainnech') is a city in County Kilkenny, Ireland. It is located in the South-East Region and in the province of Leinster. It is built on both banks of the River Nore. The 2022 census gave the population of Kilkenny as 27,184, the thirteenth-largest urban centre in Ireland.

Kilkenny is a tourist destination, and its environs include historic buildings such as Kilkenny Castle, St Canice's Cathedral and round tower, Rothe House, Shee Alms House, Black Abbey, St. Mary's Cathedral, The Tholsel, St. Francis Abbey, Grace's Castle, and St. John's Priory. Kilkenny is also known for its craft and design workshops, the Watergate Theatre, public gardens and museums. Annual events include Kilkenny Arts Festival, the Cat Laughs comedy festival and music at the Kilkenny Roots Festival.

Kilkenny began with an early 6th-century ecclesiastical foundation within the Kingdom of Ossory. Following the 12th-century Norman invasion of Ireland, Kilkenny Castle and a series of walls were built to protect the burghers of what became a Norman merchant town. William Marshall, Lord of Leinster, gave Kilkenny a charter as a town in 1207. By the late 13th century, Kilkenny was under Hiberno-Norman control. The Statutes of Kilkenny, passed at Kilkenny in 1367, aimed to curb the decline of the Hiberno-Norman Lordship of Ireland. In 1609, King James I of England granted Kilkenny a Royal Charter, giving it the status of a city. Following the Irish Rebellion of 1641, the Irish Catholic Confederation, also known as the "Confederation of Kilkenny", was based in Kilkenny and lasted until the Cromwellian conquest of Ireland in 1649. From 1840 onwards, Kilkenny has not been administered as a city under local government law, but the Local Government Reform Act 2014 provides for "the continued use of the description city".

Kilkenny was a brewing centre from the late 17th century and still houses a number of breweries. The Heritage Council offices are at Church Lane in the former Bishop's Palace. The seat of the Roman Catholic Bishop of Ossory is at St Mary's Cathedral and the Church of Ireland Bishop of Cashel and Ossory is at St Canice's Cathedral.

== Toponymy ==
Kilkenny is the anglicised version of the Irish Cill Chainnigh, meaning Cell/Church of Cainneach or Canice. This relates to a church built in honour of St. Canice, an Ulsterman, on the hill now containing St. Canice's Cathedral and the round tower. This seems to be the first major settlement. The early Christian origin of the round tower suggests an early ecclesiastical foundation at Kilkenny.

Ceall-Cainnigh was for the most part burned.

— Four Masters, Annals of the Four Masters, 1085.

The Annals of the Four Masters recorded Kilkenny in 1085. Prior to this time the early 6th-century territory was known as Osraighe, referring to the whole district or the capital. The Four Masters entry was the first instance where the capital was called Ceall-Cainnigh (modernised Kilkenny). Cill Chainnigh was a major monastic centre from at least the eighth century. There is no mention of Cill Chainnigh in the lives of Cainnech of Aghaboe, Ciarán of Saighir or any of the early annals of Ireland suggesting that Cill Chainnigh was not of ancient civil importance.

== History ==
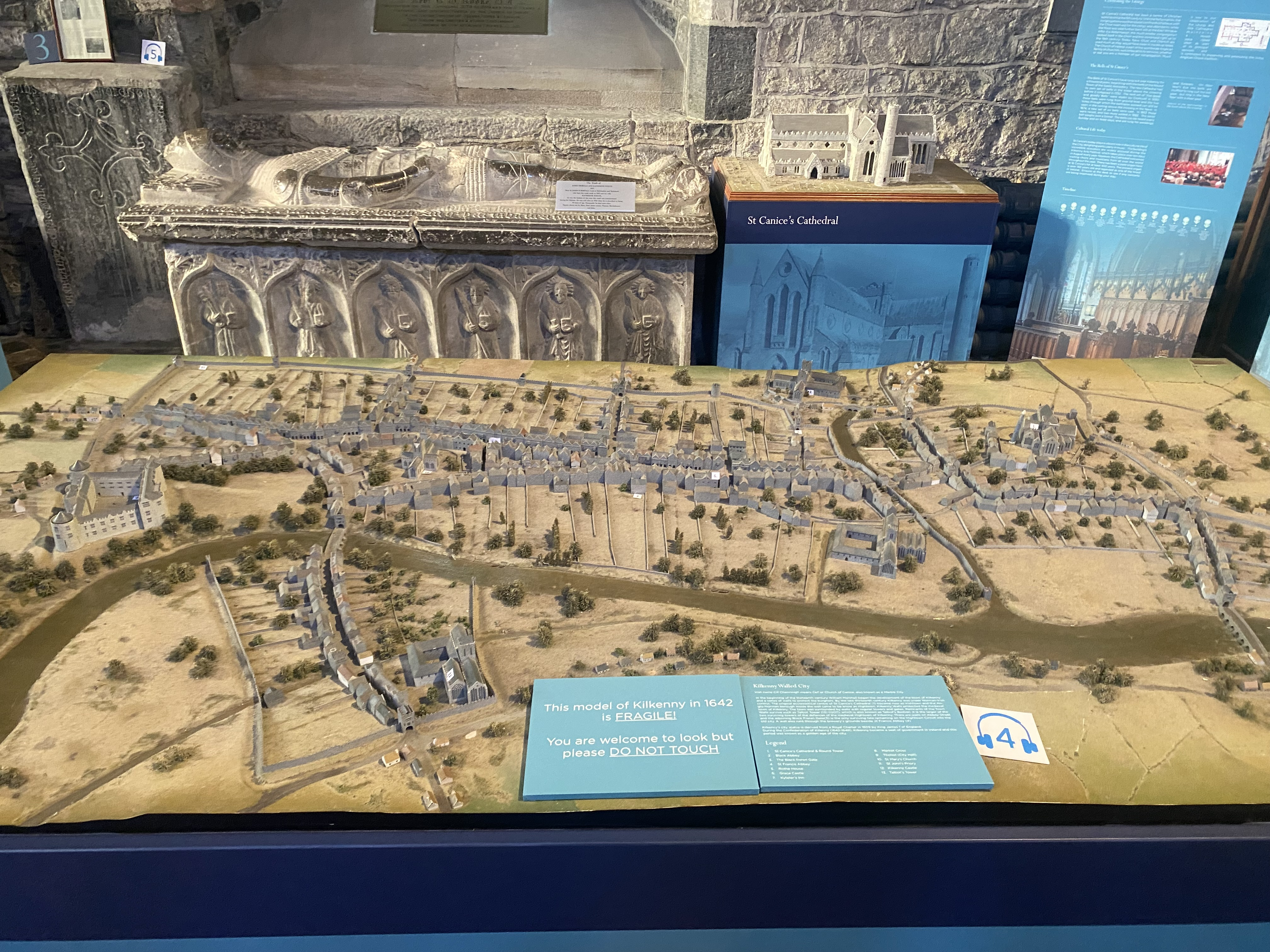
Model of Kilkenny in 1642

Kilkenny's foundation began with an early 6th-century ecclesiastical settlement, with a church built in honour of St. Canice. Now St. Canice's Cathedral, this was a major monastic centre from at least the 8th century. The Annals of the Four Masters recorded the first reference Cill Chainnigh in 1085. Prehistoric activity has been recorded, suggesting intermittent settlement activity in the area in the Mesolithic and Bronze Age. Information on the history of Kilkenny can be found in newspapers, photographs, letters, drawings, manuscripts and archaeology. Kilkenny is documented in manuscripts from the 13th century onwards and one of the most important of these is Liber Primus Kilkenniensis.

The Kings of Ossory, O'Carrolls and Fitzpatricks, had residence around Cill Chainnigh. The seat of the diocese of Kingdom of Osraige was moved from Aghaboe to Cill Chainnigh. Following the Norman invasion of Ireland, Richard Strongbow, as Lord of Leinster, established a castle near modern-day Kilkenny Castle. William Marshall began the development of the town of Kilkenny and a series of walls to protect the burghers. By the late 13th century, Kilkenny was under Norman-Irish control. The original ecclesiastical centre at St. Canice's Cathedral became known as Irishtown and the Anglo-Norman borough inside the wall came to be known as Hightown.

Kilkenny was the site of Ireland's earliest recorded witch trial. Occurring in 1324 and instigated by the Bishop of Ossory, Richard de Ledrede, the trial involved Dame Alice de Kyteler and her servant Petronella de Meath. Petronella would be the first person recorded in Ireland to be burned alive at the stake for witchcraft, after Dame Alice presumably fled the country. This trial was also one of the earliest recorded witch burnings in Europe and inspires much folklore about the possibility of the ghosts of Alice and Petronella haunting downtown Kilkenny. Alice's house, Kyteler's Inn, still stands and is now a pub.

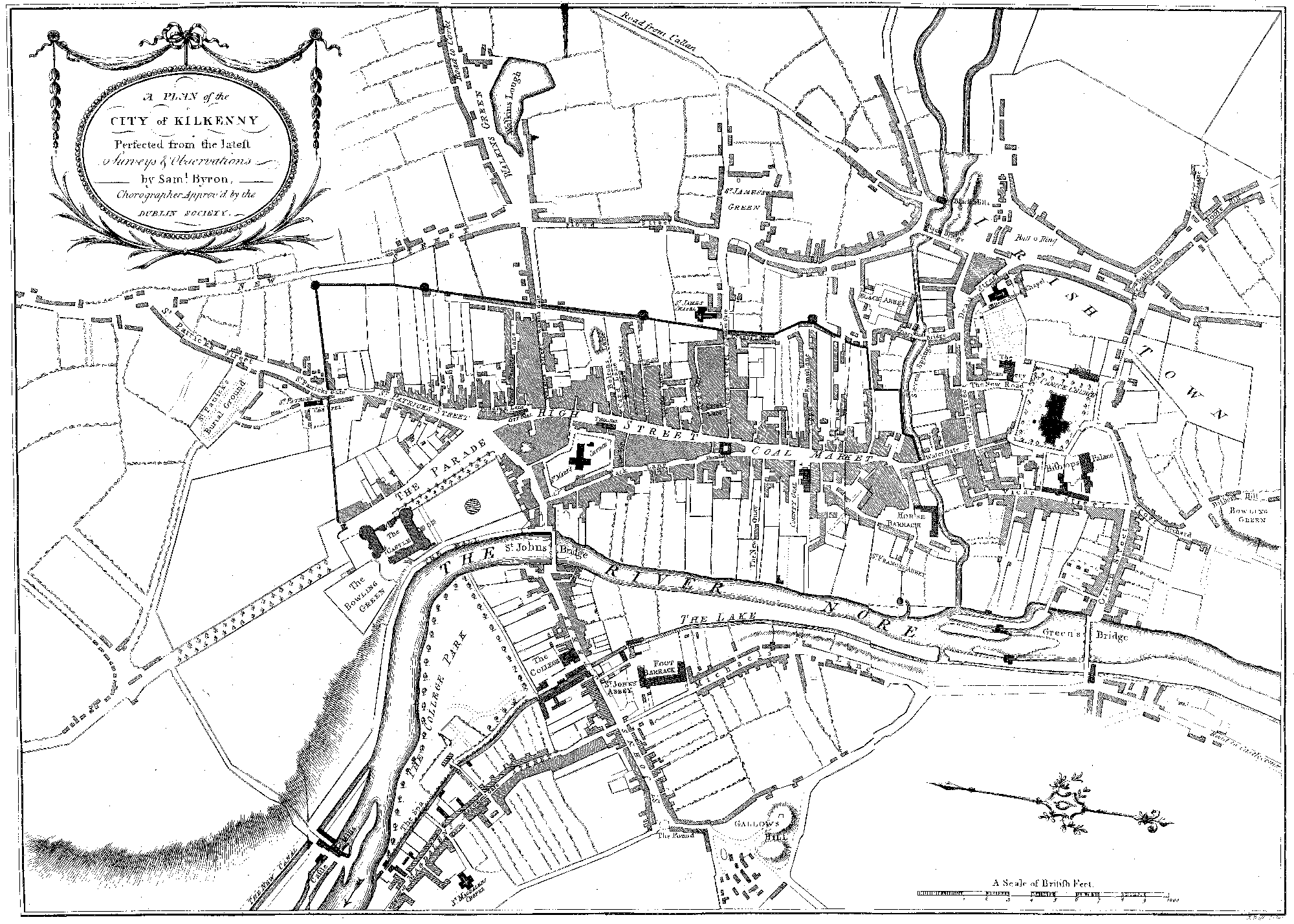
Old city map, c. 1780

The Hiberno-Norman presence in Kilkenny was deeply shaken by the Black Death, which arrived in 1348. The Statutes of Kilkenny passed at Kilkenny in 1367, aimed to curb the decline of the Hiberno-Norman Lordship of Ireland. In 1609, King James I of England granted Kilkenny a Royal Charter giving it the status of a city. Following the Rebellion of 1641, the Irish Catholic Confederation, also known as the "Confederation of Kilkenny", was based in Kilkenny and lasted until the Cromwellian conquest of Ireland in 1649. James II of England spent most of the winter months from November 1689 until January 1690 at Kilkenny, residing in the castle.

Stephens Barracks, built in the years following the 1798 Rebellion, was completed between 1800 and 1803.

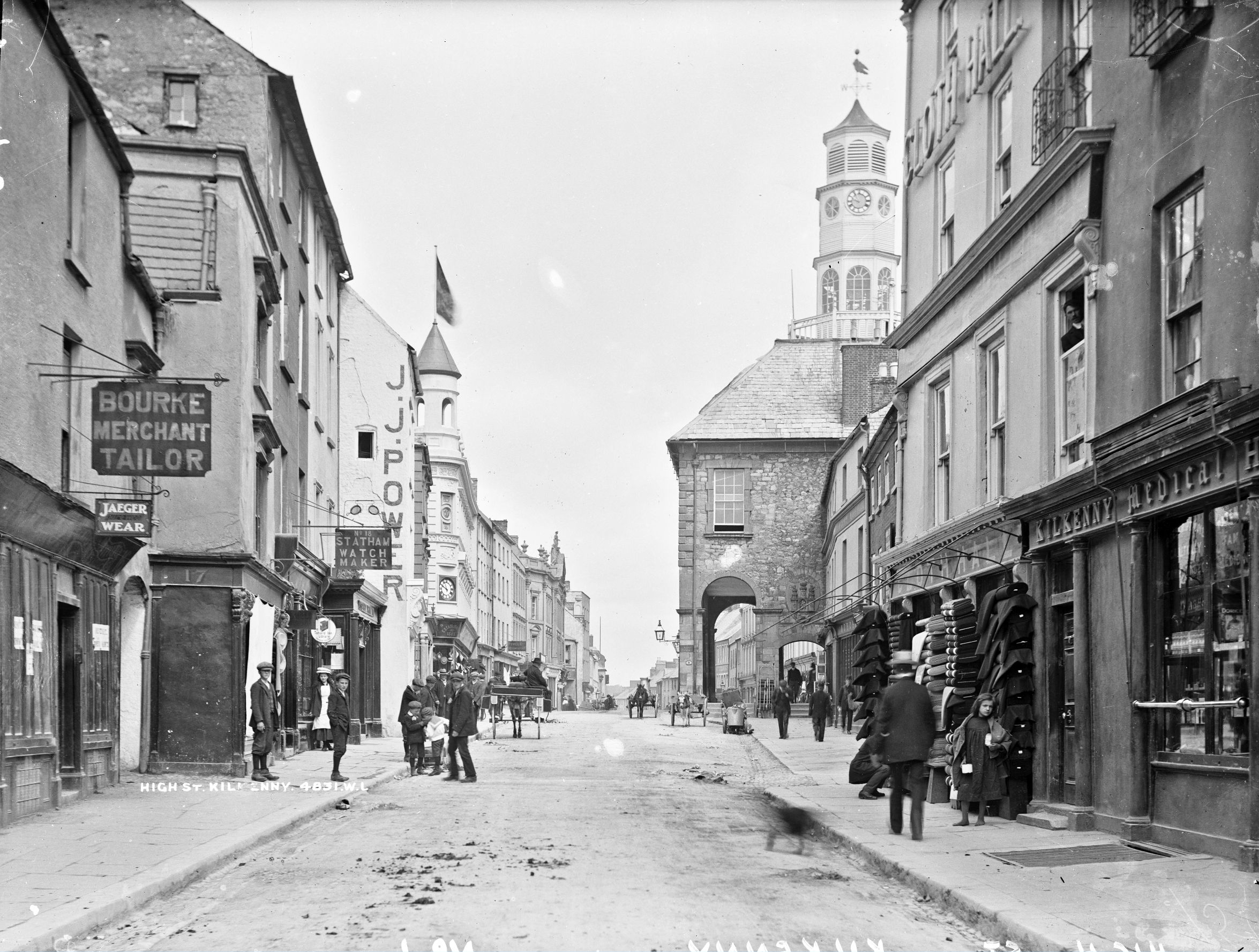
High Street, Kilkenny in the early 1900s

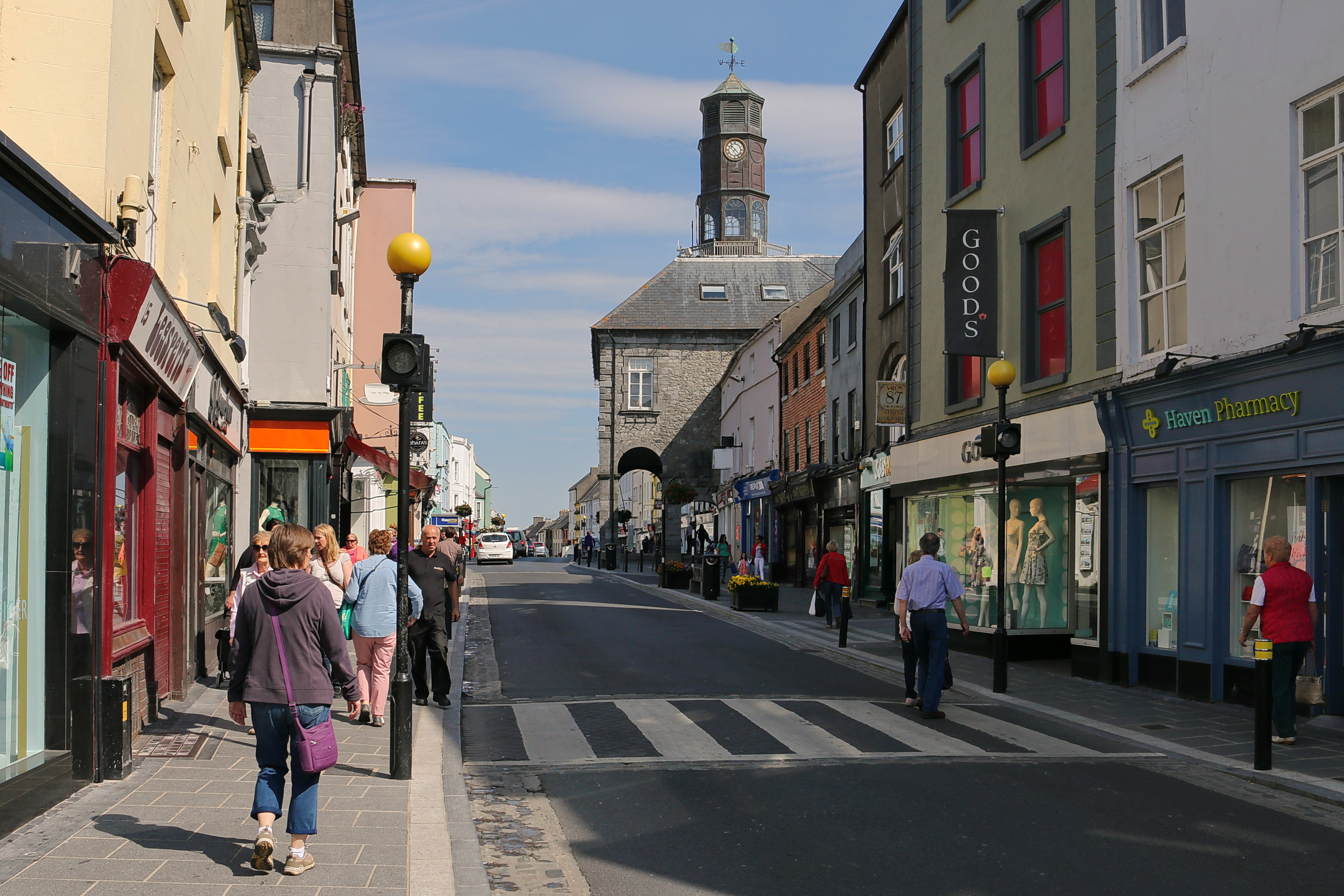
High Street, Kilkenny in 2015

The Kilkenny Design Workshops were opened in 1965 and in 1967 the Marquess of Ormonde presented Kilkenny Castle to the people of Kilkenny. Today, it has a lively cultural scene, with annual events including the Kilkenny Arts Week Festival in the last two weeks of August, and the Cat Laughs Comedy Festival at the beginning of June. Kilkenny is also where Smithwick's, an Irish ale, was first brewed. Kilkenny is referred to as the Marble City, and people from Kilkenny are often referred to as 'Cats'. The seat of the Roman Catholic Bishop of Ossory is at St. Mary's Cathedral and the Church of Ireland Bishop of Cashel and Ossory is at St. Canice's Cathedral.

== Geography ==
=== Location and topography ===
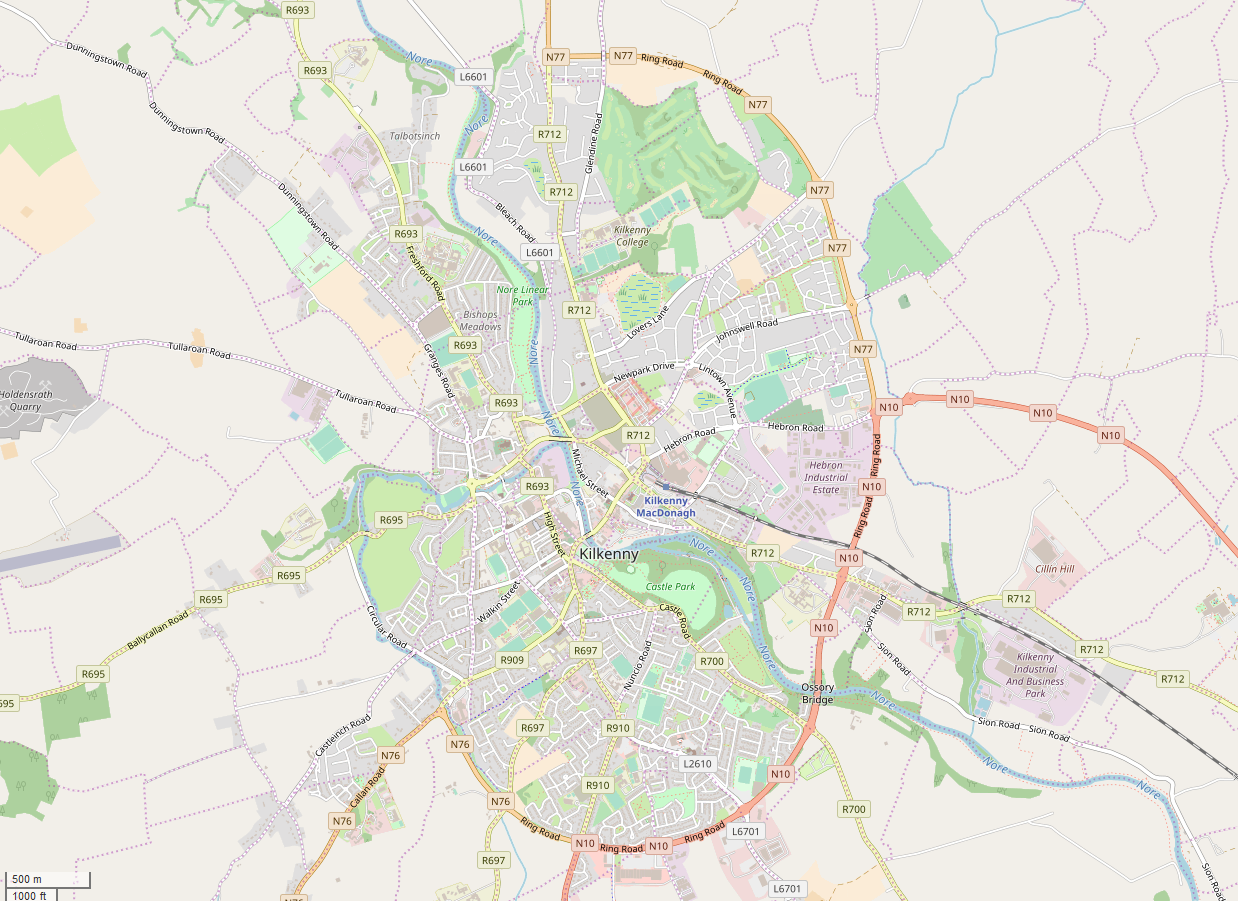
Map of Kilkenny

Kilkenny is situated in the Nore Valley on both banks of the River Nore, at the centre of County Kilkenny in the province of Leinster in the south-east of Ireland. It is 117 kilometres (73 mi) away the capital Dublin and 48 kilometres (30 mi) north from the nearest city Waterford. Wexford is 80 kilometres (50 mi) to the south-east and Limerick is 122 kilometres (76 mi) to the west. The elevation is 60 metres (200 ft) above mean sea level. The area of Kilkenny borough is 3.74 square kilometres (1.44 mi^{2}). The first edition of the Ordnance Survey map for Kilkenny was in 1837 and is held by the County Library.

=== Climate ===
Kilkenny

Climate chart (precipitation, max. and min. temperature)
J	F	M	A	M	J	J	A	S	O	N	D
78 8 2	66 9 2	68 11 3	56 13 4	60 16 7	61 18 9	55 20 11	78 20 11	69 18 9	95 14 7	80 11 4	90 9 2
- █ Average max. and min. temperatures in °C
- █ Precipitation totals in mm
Imperial conversion
J	F	M	A	M	J	J	A	S	O	N	D
3.1 47 35	2.6 47 35	2.7 51 38	2.2 55 40	2.4 60 44	2.4 65 49	2.1 69 52	3.1 68 52	2.7 64 48	3.8 57 44	3.2 51 39	3.6 48 36
- █ Average max. and min. temperatures in °F
- █ Precipitation totals in inches

The climate of Kilkenny, like the climate of Ireland, is a changeable oceanic climate with few extremes. It is defined as a temperate oceanic climate, or Cfb on the Köppen climate classification system. Kilkenny lies in plant Hardiness zone 9. At the centre of the county, Kilkenny is in a sheltered location, 66 kilometres (41 mi) inland and is surrounded by hills over 200 metres (660 ft), which ensures that it is not a windy location. The highest wind gust of 77 knots, from a south-west direction, was recorded on 12 January 1974.

Kilkenny is generally representative of wide river valleys in the region with low temperatures on cloudless nights, and is significant in that it records some of the highest summer and lowest winter temperatures in Ireland. The highest air temperature ever recorded in Ireland was 33.3 °C (91.9 °F), at Kilkenny Castle on 26 June 1887.

The Met Éireann Kilkenny Weather Observing Station, 2 km north-west of the centre of Kilkenny, on the Duningstown Road, opened in May 1957, and observations ceased in April 2008. A climatological station is currently in operation within 1 km of the old site, and as of March 2010, was providing live weather data to the general public and climate data to Met Éireann. Extremes recorded at the station include the highest air temperature of 31.5 °C (88.7 °F) on 29 June 1976, the lowest air temperature of −14.1 °C (6.6 °F) on 2 January 1979 and the lowest ground temperature of −18.1 °C (−0.6 °F) on 12 January 1982.

The warmest and sunniest month on record in Kilkenny was August 1995 with a total of 274.9 hours sunshine and very high temperatures throughout. The maximum daily sunshine was 16.3 hours on 18 June 1978. The overall trend in temperatures has been on the rise with a marked increase from 1988 onwards. Annual temperatures are running over 0.5 degrees or 0.9 °F above 20th century levels.

The maximum daily rainfall recorded at Kilkenny station was 66.4 mm (2.61 in) on 17 July 1983. The late 1950s and early 1960s were wet but rainfall had been steady throughout the century. 2002 was a very wet year and since 2005 annual rainfall has been increasing steadily, with 2009 being the wettest year since records commenced in 1958.

Climate data for Kilkenny (1978–2007 normals, extremes 1957-2008)
Month	Jan	Feb	Mar	Apr	May	Jun	Jul	Aug	Sep	Oct	Nov	Dec	Year
Record high °C (°F)	14.1 (57.4)	15.9 (60.6)	19.2 (66.6)	23.5 (74.3)	26.0 (78.8)	31.5 (88.7)	31.4 (88.5)	30.8 (87.4)	26.6 (79.9)	23.7 (74.7)	17.5 (63.5)	15.5 (59.9)	31.5 (88.7)
Mean daily maximum °C (°F)	8.2 (46.8)	8.6 (47.5)	10.6 (51.1)	12.9 (55.2)	15.7 (60.3)	18.2 (64.8)	20.3 (68.5)	20.2 (68.4)	17.8 (64.0)	14.1 (57.4)	10.8 (51.4)	8.8 (47.8)	13.8 (56.8)
Daily mean °C (°F)	4.9 (40.8)	5.2 (41.4)	6.9 (44.4)	8.5 (47.3)	11.1 (52.0)	13.8 (56.8)	15.8 (60.4)	15.6 (60.1)	13.4 (56.1)	10.3 (50.5)	7.3 (45.1)	5.6 (42.1)	9.9 (49.8)
Mean daily minimum °C (°F)	1.6 (34.9)	1.9 (35.4)	3.2 (37.8)	4.2 (39.6)	6.5 (43.7)	9.3 (48.7)	11.3 (52.3)	11.0 (51.8)	9.1 (48.4)	6.5 (43.7)	3.7 (38.7)	2.4 (36.3)	5.9 (42.6)
Record low °C (°F)	−14.1 (6.6)	−11.1 (12.0)	−7.9 (17.8)	−5.4 (22.3)	−3.7 (25.3)	0.5 (32.9)	2.3 (36.1)	1.2 (34.2)	−1.6 (29.1)	−4.8 (23.4)	−7.0 (19.4)	−10.8 (12.6)	−14.1 (6.6)
Average precipitation mm (inches)	78.3 (3.08)	66.1 (2.60)	67.9 (2.67)	56.4 (2.22)	60.4 (2.38)	61.0 (2.40)	54.6 (2.15)	77.8 (3.06)	69.0 (2.72)	95.3 (3.75)	80.2 (3.16)	90.4 (3.56)	857.4 (33.76)
Average precipitation days (≥ 1.0 mm)	13	12	12	10	11	10	9	10	10	13	12	13	135
Average snowy days	3.6	3.6	2.5	0.8	0.1	0.0	0.0	0.0	0.0	0.0	0.1	2.0	12.8
Average relative humidity (%) (at 15:00 LST)	79.5	74.3	69.2	63.6	63.4	65.9	65.2	65.1	67.5	74.2	78.9	81.8	70.7
Mean monthly sunshine hours	55.8	65.0	99.2	147.0	173.6	147.0	145.7	145.7	120.0	93.0	66.0	49.6	1,314.9
Mean daily sunshine hours	1.8	2.3	3.2	4.9	5.6	4.9	4.7	4.7	4.0	3.0	2.2	1.6	3.6
Source: Met Éireann

== Demographics ==
=== Population ===
Historical population
Year	Pop.	±%
1821	23,230	—
1831	23,741	+2.2%
1841	19,071	−19.7%
1851	15,257	−20.0%
1861	13,235	−13.3%
1871	12,710	−4.0%
1881	12,299	−3.2%
1891	11,048	−10.2%
1901	10,609	−4.0%
1911	19,514	+83.9%
1926	10,046	−48.5%
1936	10,237	+1.9%
1946	10,291	+0.5%
1951	10,572	+2.7%
1956	12,328	+16.6%
1961	12,081	−2.0%
1966	12,030	−0.4%
1971	13,306	+10.6%
1981	16,886	+26.9%
1986	17,517	+3.7%
1991	17,669	+0.9%
1996	18,696	+5.8%
2002	20,735	+10.9%
2006	22,179	+7.0%
2011	24,423	+10.1%
2016	26,512	+8.6%
2022	27,184	+2.5%

The majority of the population of Kilkenny live outside the borough's boundary. The urban centre of Kilkenny, as defined by the census, had a population of 27,184 in 2022.

Changes as of the 2006 census, by the Central Statistics Office, Kilkenny Town Borough had a population of 8,661 which was an increase of 70 persons over the 2002 figure of 8,591 or 0.8%. The Town Environs had a population of 13,518 which was an increase of 1347 persons over the 2002 figure of 12,144 or 11.3%. Overall both the Borough & Environs had a population of 22,179 in 2006 which was an increase of 1444 persons over the 2002 figure of 20,735 or 7.0%. People from Kilkenny are often referred to as 'Cats'.

Disposable household income per person as of 2005 was €18,032 and the index of disposable household was 89.4.

=== Languages and religions ===
Kilkenny is multilingual but predominantly English-speaking, with Irish being the second most commonly spoken language. In recent decades, with the increase of immigration on an all-Ireland basis, many more languages have been introduced into Kilkenny.

The main religion is Catholicism, however, there are adherents of the Church of Ireland, Presbyterian, Methodist, Jewish and other religious traditions living in Kilkenny.

== Administration ==
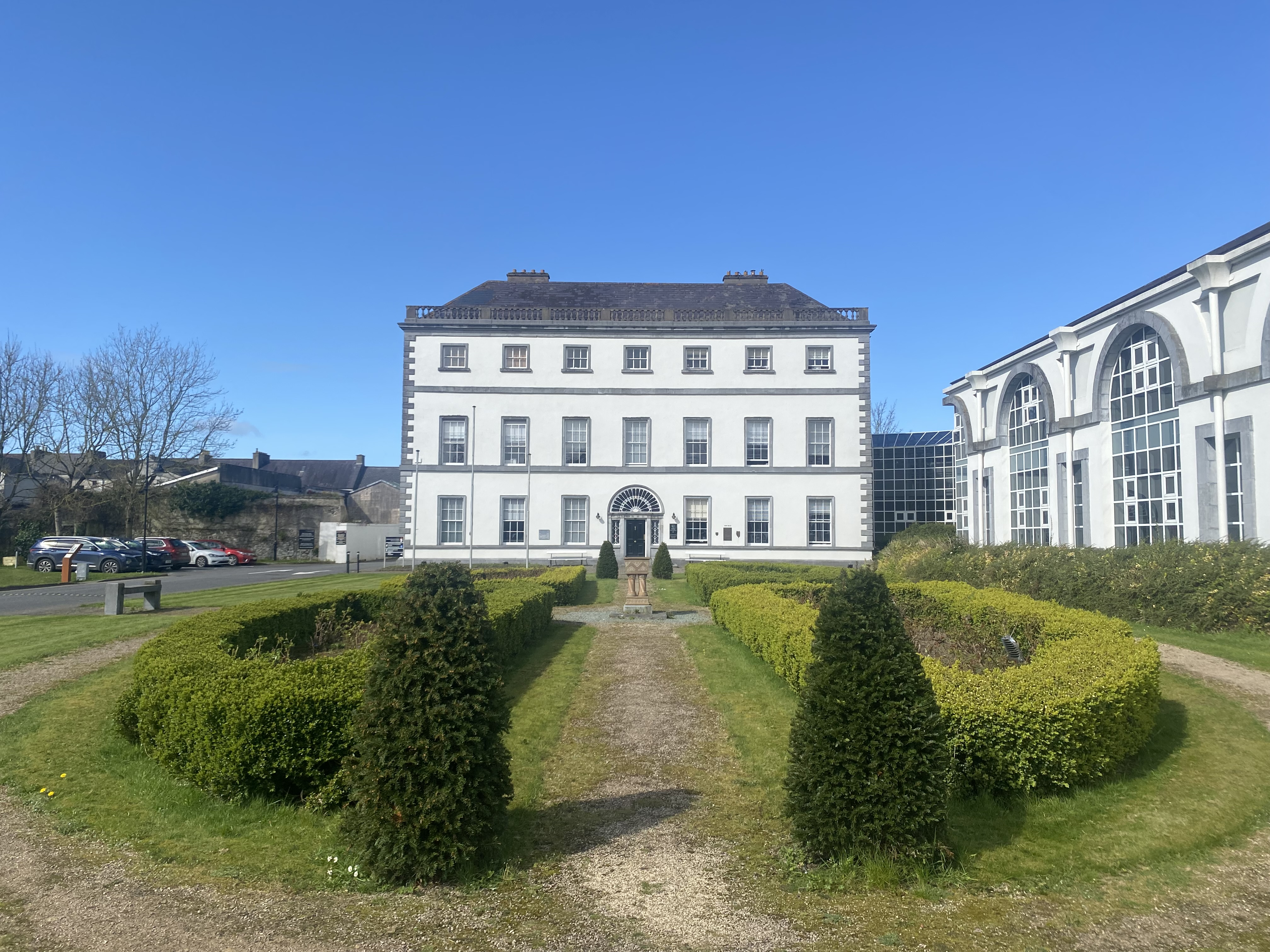
Kilkenny County Hall in 2024

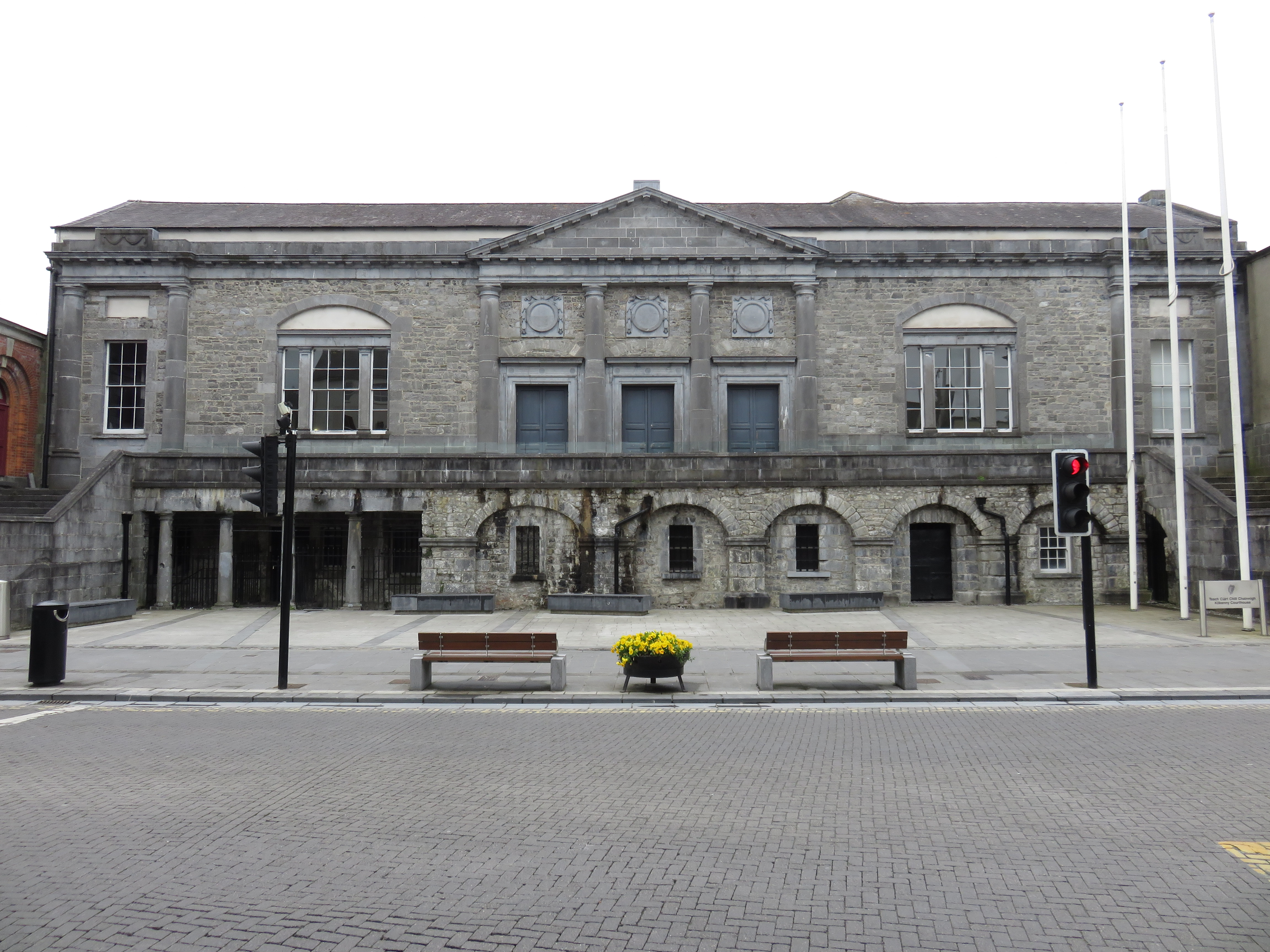
Kilkenny Courthouse in 2018

Kilkenny is now administered as part of County Kilkenny. The local electoral area of Kilkenny contains the electoral divisions of Dunmore, Kilkenny No. 1 Urban, Kilkenny No. 2 Urban, Kilkenny Rural and St. Canice, and elects 7 of the 24 members of Kilkenny County Council. This area is defined as the Municipal District of Kilkenny City. Local government bodies in Kilkenny have responsibility for such matters as planning, roads, sanitation and libraries and are governed by the Local Government Acts 1925 to 2019, the principal Act being the Local Government Act 2001.

Kilkenny's first council was elected in 1231. From the 13th century to the end of the 16th, the chief magistrate was known as the sovereign, and since then as the mayor. It was granted a royal charter as a city in 1609 by James I of England and Ireland. This was a county corporate which included the borough of Irishtown, which fell within the city. The borough corporation established under the Municipal Corporations (Ireland) Act 1840 is a successor to both the corporation established under this charter and of the borough of Irishtown. In 1899, under the Local Government (Ireland) Act 1898, the area became an urban district, but its council retained the style of a borough corporation. In 2002, under the Local Government Act 2001, Kilkenny Borough Corporation became a borough council. On 1 June 2014, under the Local Government Reform Act 2014, the borough council was dissolved and administration of the town was amalgamated with Kilkenny County Council.

County Kilkenny is part of the Southern Region. It is part of the Carlow–Kilkenny Dáil constituency and the South European Parliament constituency.

In the Irish House of Commons, both Kilkenny City and the bishop's borough of St Canice (or Irishtown) were represented with two MPs each. From 1801, following the Acts of Union 1800, Kilkenny City was represented in the United Kingdom House of Commons by one MP from 1801 to 1918, and as part of North Kilkenny from 1918 to 1922. In 1921, the Carlow–Kilkenny Dáil constituency was created. This continued until 1937, when there was a separate Kilkenny constituency, but from 1948 there has been a continuous constituency of Carlow–Kilkenny.

=== City status ===
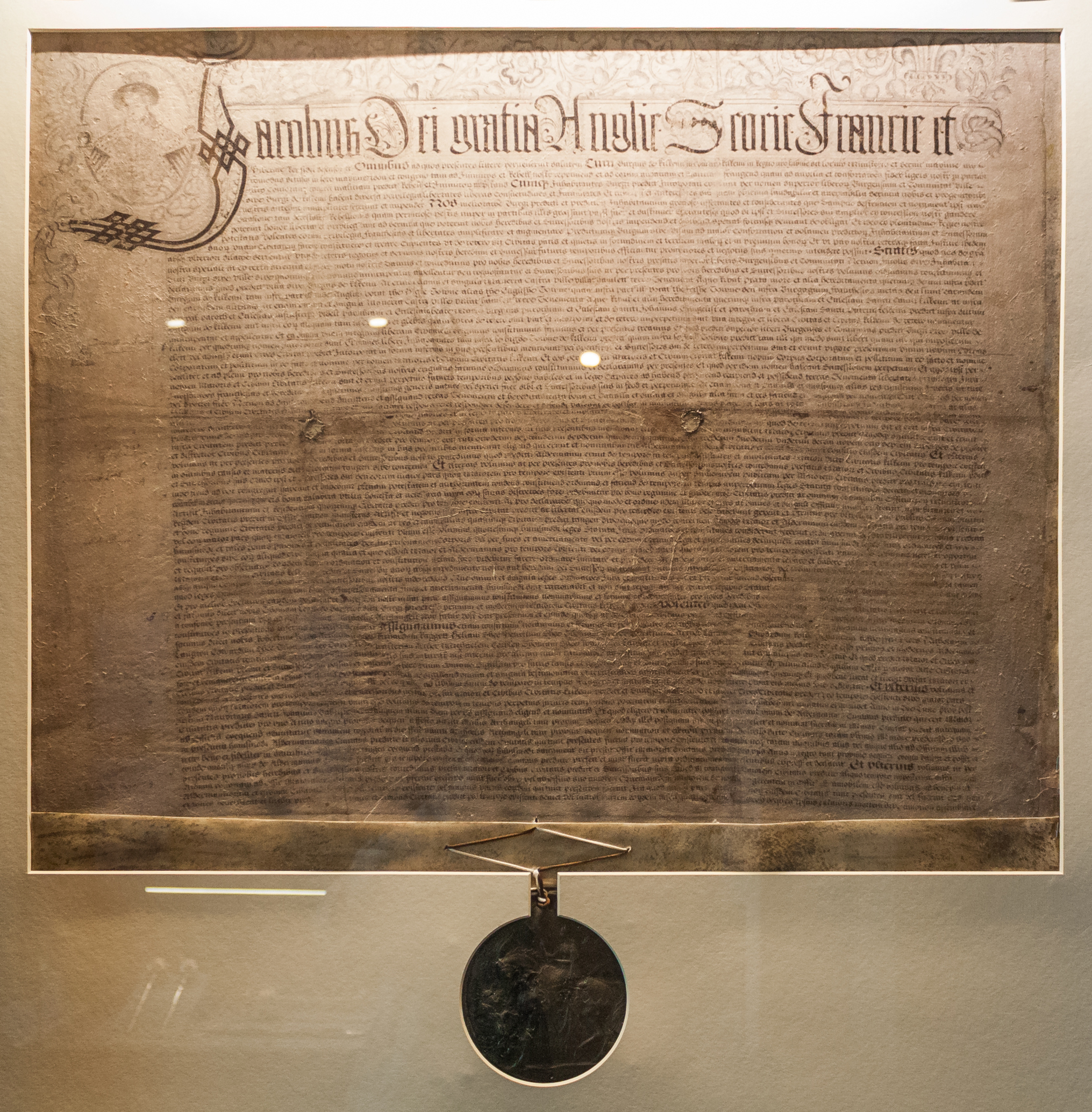
Charter of King James I of England from 1609 which raised Kilkenny to a city with a mayor or mayors (Note: This mayor or these mayors is/are set "to have a sword carried before him or them within the said city, and the county of the said city, at their will and pleasure, in such manner and form as is used in any other city or cities before any Mayor or Mayors within the said Kingdom of Ireland.")

While the present-day settlement is administered as a municipal district, the appellation "city" is an emotive subject in Kilkenny. Historically, city status in the United Kingdom, and before that in the Kingdom of Ireland, was a ceremonial designation awarded by the crown. It carried more prestige than the alternative municipal titles "borough" or "town", but gave no additional legal powers (the qualifying factor was the presence of a cathedral, resulting in some very small cities such as Wells, with a population 12,000 as of 2018 and St Davids, with a population of 1,841 as of 2011). A city in Irish law has special legal meaning with corresponding powers for local government. From a local government perspective, Kilkenny has not been administered as a city since at least 1840. The present-day legal, political and administrative jurisdictions in Ireland are set out in the Local Government Act 2001, as amended by the Local Government Reform Act 2014.

In 2002, under the Local Government Act 2001, the former five county boroughs were redesignated as cities. At the same time, the historic city status of Kilkenny was acknowledged in law. When this legislation was being debated, local TDs Phil Hogan and John McGuinness successfully lobbied that Kilkenny could continue to be referred to as a "city". Accordingly, a clause was added to the 2001 bill:

the continued use of the description city in relation to Kilkenny, to the extent that that description was used before the establishment day.

— Local Government Act 2001

It remains both common and permissible in law to describe Kilkenny as a city; section 10(6) of the 2001 Act, as amended by the 2014 Act, provides that "the continued use of the description city in relation to Kilkenny, to the extent that that description was used before 1 January 2002 and is not otherwise inconsistent with this Act".

As of 2014, Kilkenny does not have an administration separate from the county. However, under Local Government Reform Act 2014, the municipal district is distinctly acknowledged as "the Municipal District of Kilkenny City".

== Landmarks ==
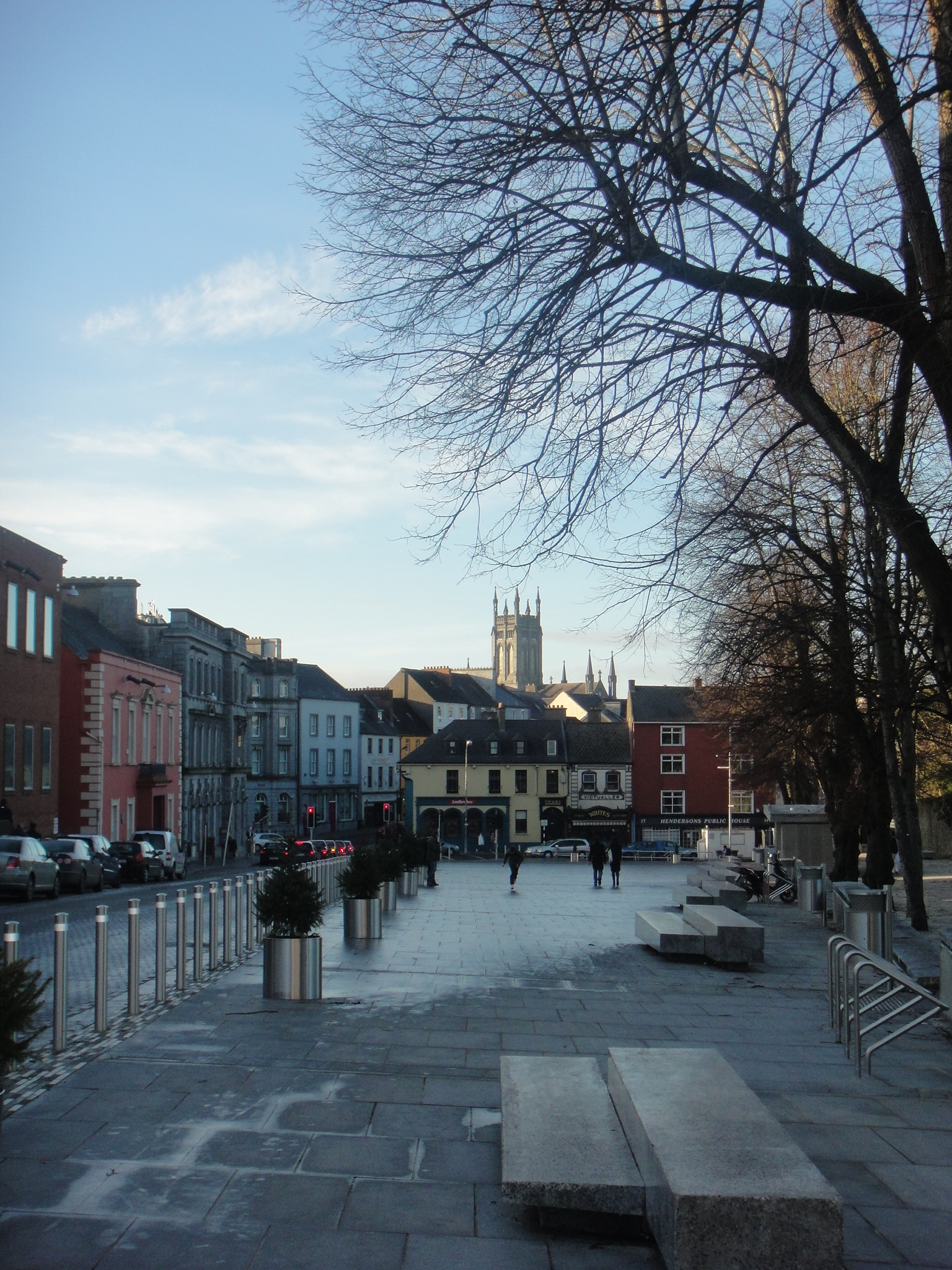
The New Parade, Kilkenny City, leading from the Castle to High Street

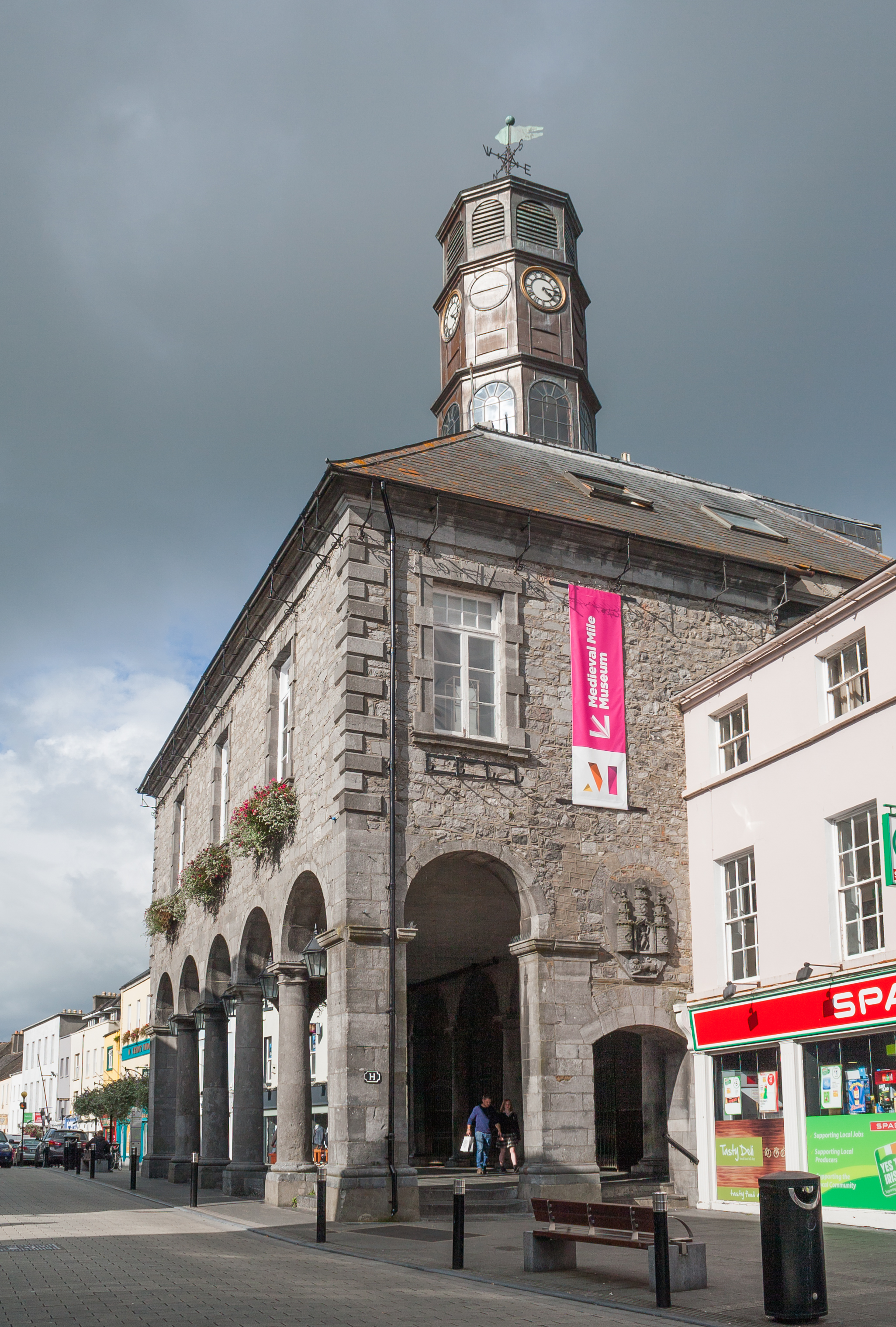
The Tholsel

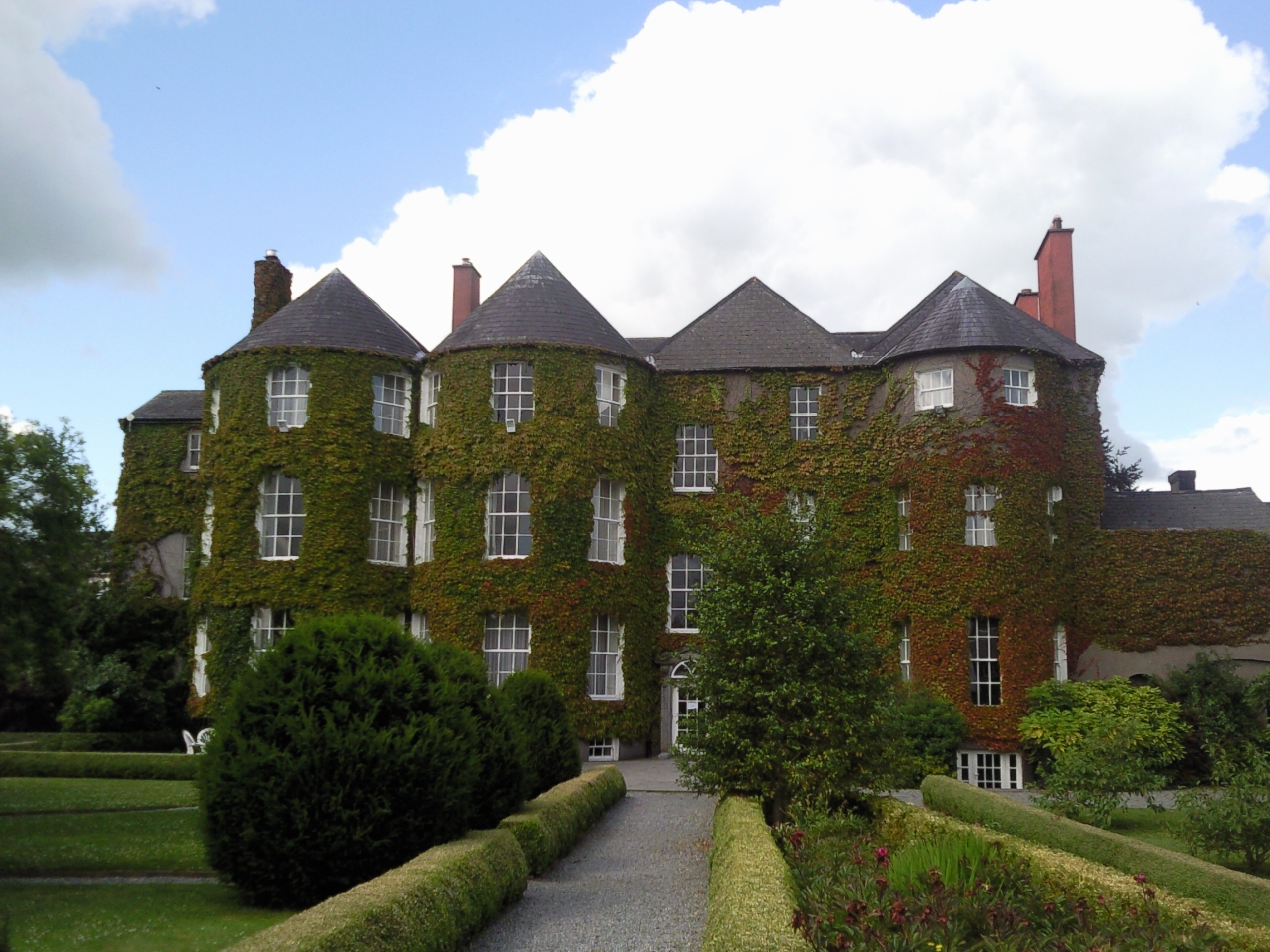
Butler House

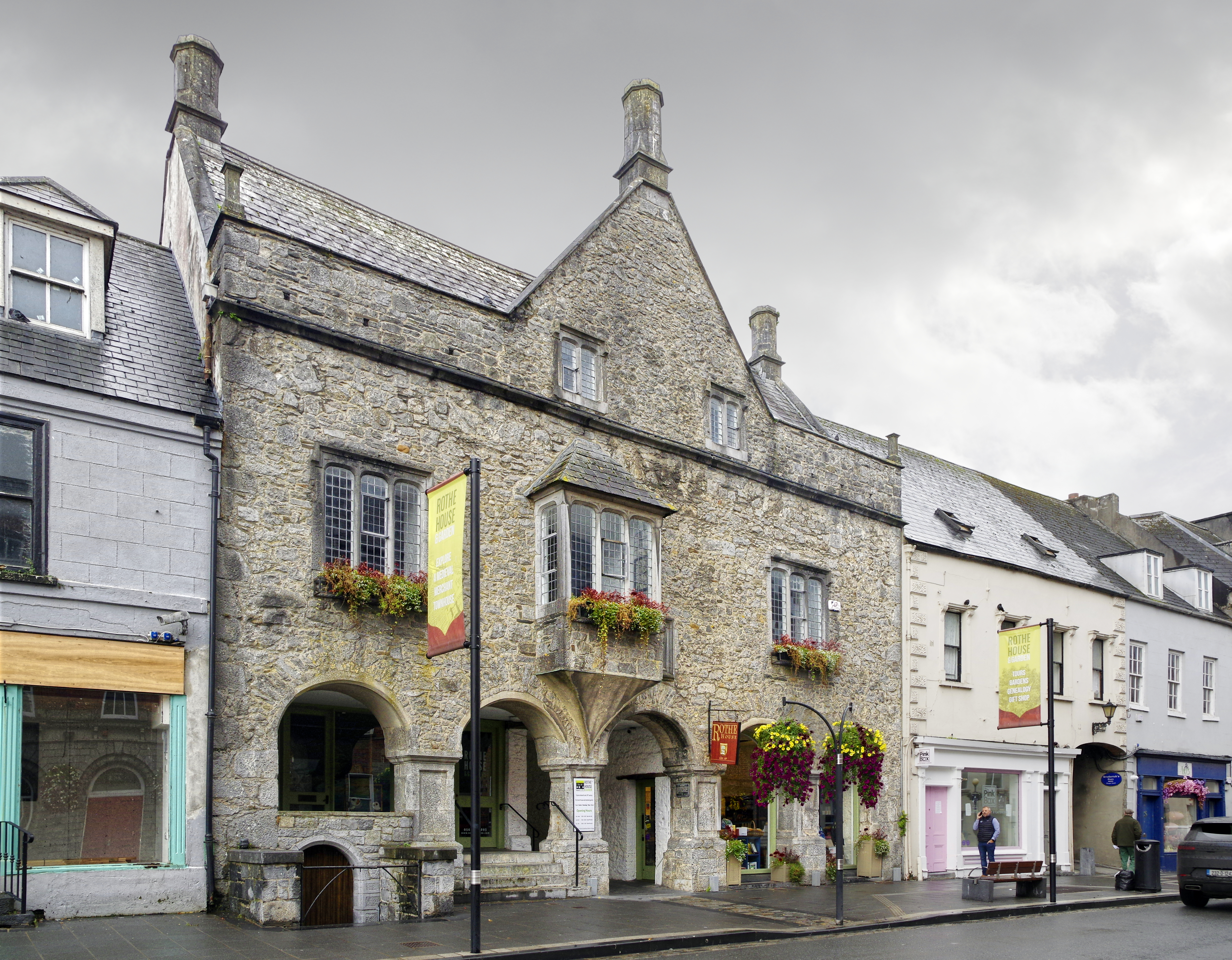
Rothe House on Parliament Street

Kilkenny's architectural heritage is represented through a number of historical buildings and landmarks. Kilkenny is a well-preserved medieval town and is dominated by both Kilkenny Castle and St. Canice's Cathedral and round tower.

Surviving examples of the city's medieval architecture include Kilkenny Castle and parts of the Kilkenny City Walls. These walls define the extent, layout and status of the medieval town. The town grew from a monastic settlement to a thriving Norman merchant town in the Middle Ages. St. Canice's Cathedral and round tower are an example of the monastic settlement. Rothe House on Parliament Street is an example of an Elizabethan merchant townhouse located on the only completely surviving burgage plot in Ireland. It also features a restored 17th-century garden on an area of half an acre behind the house, complete with herbs, vegetables and an orchard.

The black stone with decorative white fossils that forms the backbone of many of Kilkenny's fine buildings was quarried locally, particularly from the quarry located 1.6 km south of the town on the R700. (Note: An exposed rock face can still be seen from the road) Kilkenny marble was used for the plinth of the new tomb of Richard III in Leicester Cathedral in England.

Visitor attractions in Kilkenny and its environs include Kilkenny Castle and Gardens including the Butler Gallery, St. Canice's Cathedral and round tower, Rothe House and Garden, Shee Alms House, Kilkenny Courthouse, St. Mary's Cathedral, The Tholsel, the Dominican Black Abbey, St. John's Church, Butler House, Kilkenny 'Slips' and St. Francis Abbey Brewery. Gardens include the Castle Rose Garden, Rothe House Garden, the Famine Memorial Garden and the garden of Butler House.

In the county other attractions include Kells Priory, Jerpoint Abbey, Dunmore Caves, Woodstock Estate and Jenkinstown Park.

Local Kilkenny marble or black marble was used to decorate many of the city's buildings, and Kilkenny referred to the "Marble City" for this reason.

=== Kilkenny Castle and city walls ===
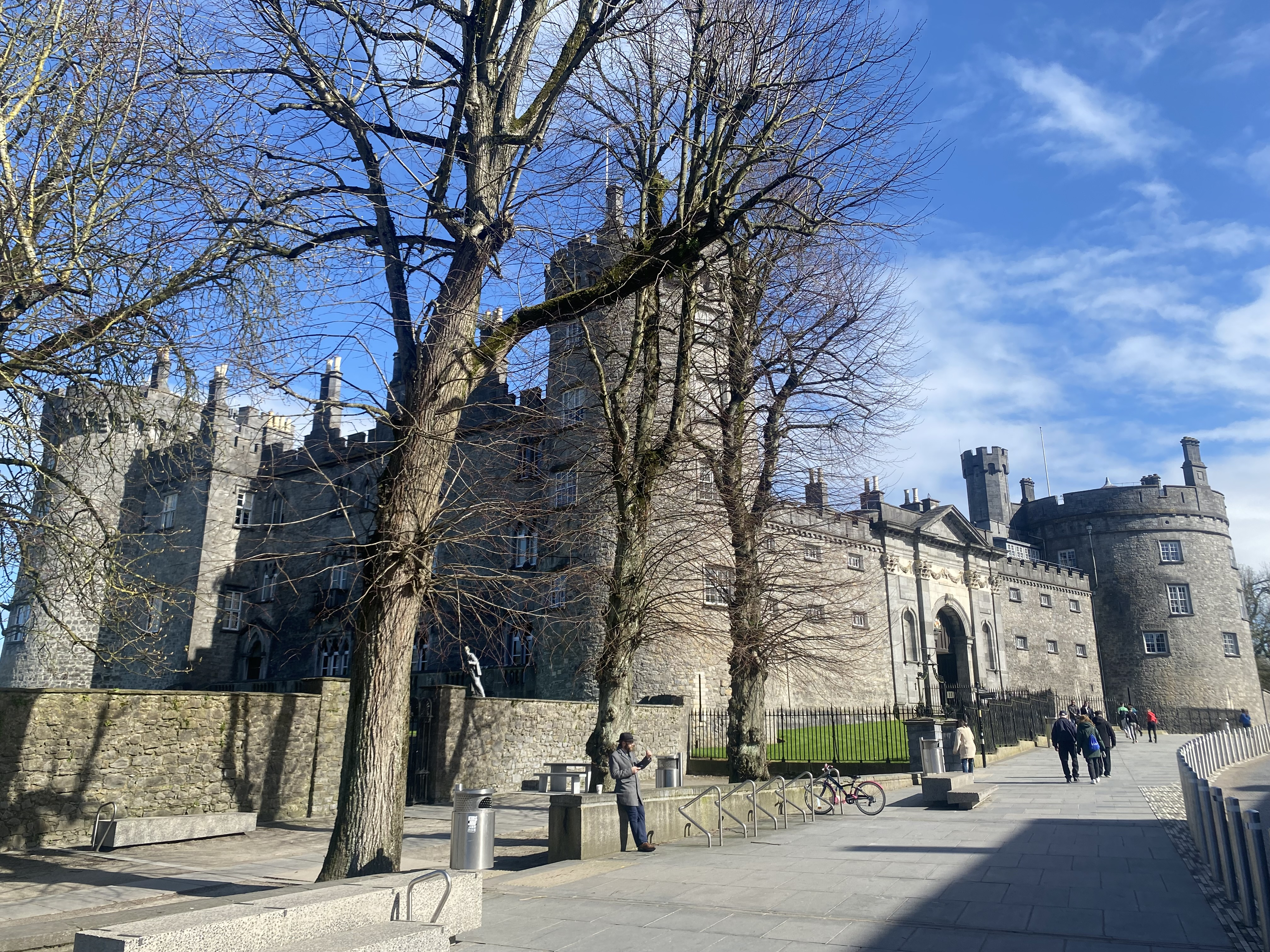
Kilkenny Castle

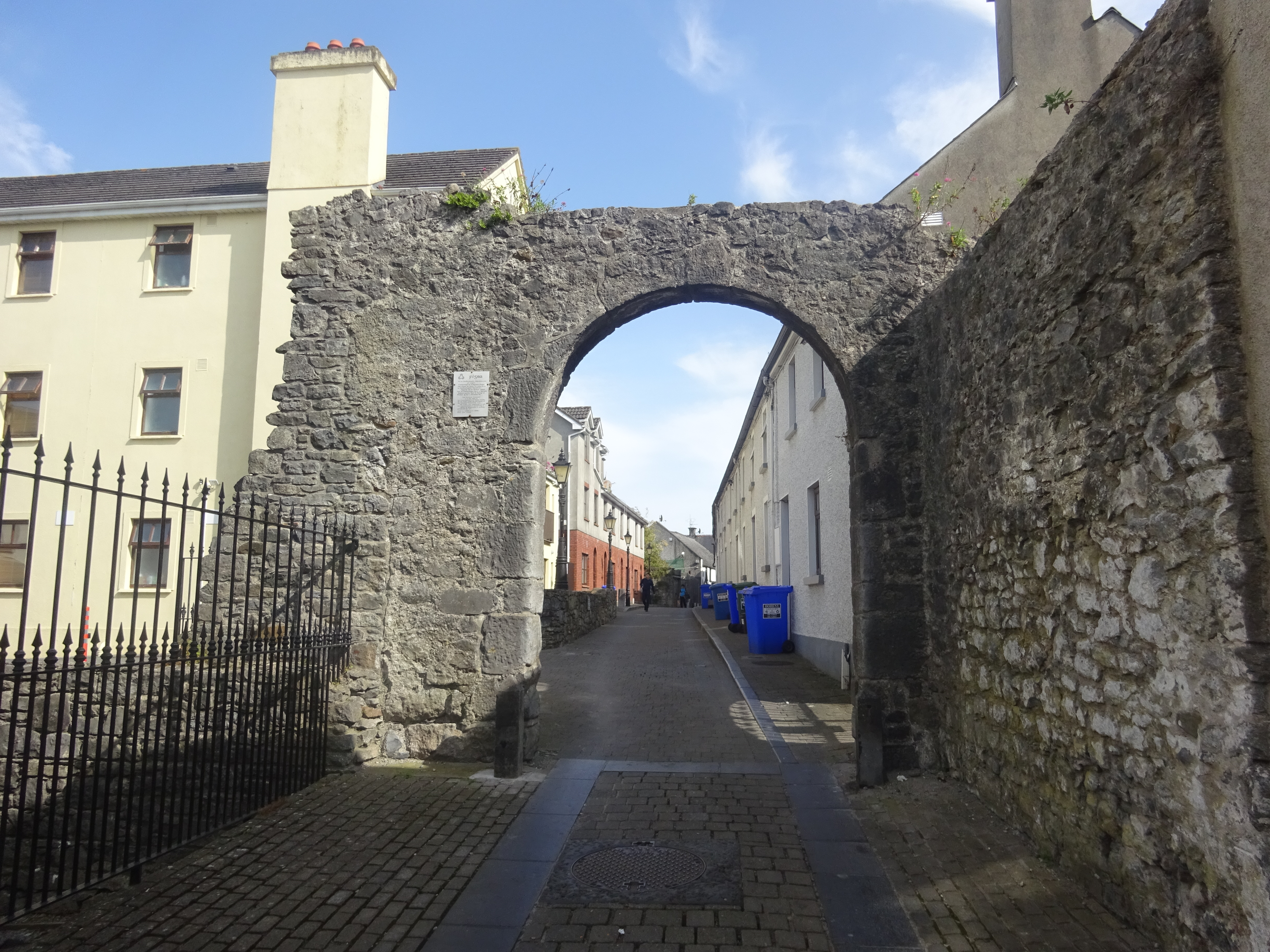
The Black Freren Gate, part of the medieval city walls

Kilkenny Castle in Kilkenny city was the seat of the Butler family. (Formerly the family name was FitzWalter.) The castle was sold to the local Castle Restoration Committee in the middle of the 20th century for £50. Shortly afterwards it was handed over to the State, and has since been refurbished and is open to visitors. Part of the collection of the National Art Gallery is on display in the castle. There are ornamental gardens on the northwest side of the castle, and extensive land and gardens to the front. It has become one of the most visited tourist sites in Ireland.

The first stone castle was begun in 1204 by William Marshall the site was completed in 1213; it was a symbol of Norman occupation and in its original thirteenth-century condition it would have formed an important element of the defences of the town. There were four large circular corner towers and a massive ditch, part of which can still be seen today on the Parade. This was a square-shaped castle with towers at each corner; three of these original four towers survive to this day.

Kilkenny Walls protected the medieval town of Kilkenny. The town was surrounded by walls with regular towers and gates. Remnants of the Town Walls survive such as Talbot Tower (1207), which is also known as Talbot's Bastion or Castle. It is the larger of the two surviving towers of the defences of the medieval High town of Kilkenny. There are walls on Abbey Street, and the adjoining Black Freren Gate is the only surviving gate/access remaining on the High town Circuit into the old city. A wall also runs through the brewery's grounds beside St. Francis Abbey.

The Kilkenny City Walls Conservation Plan is a plan by the inhabitants of Kilkenny, Kilkenny Borough Council, the Department of Environment, Heritage and Local Government, An Taisce, The Kilkenny Archaeological Society and The Heritage Council to ensure the long-term survival of the city's walls.

=== St. Canice's Cathedral and tower ===
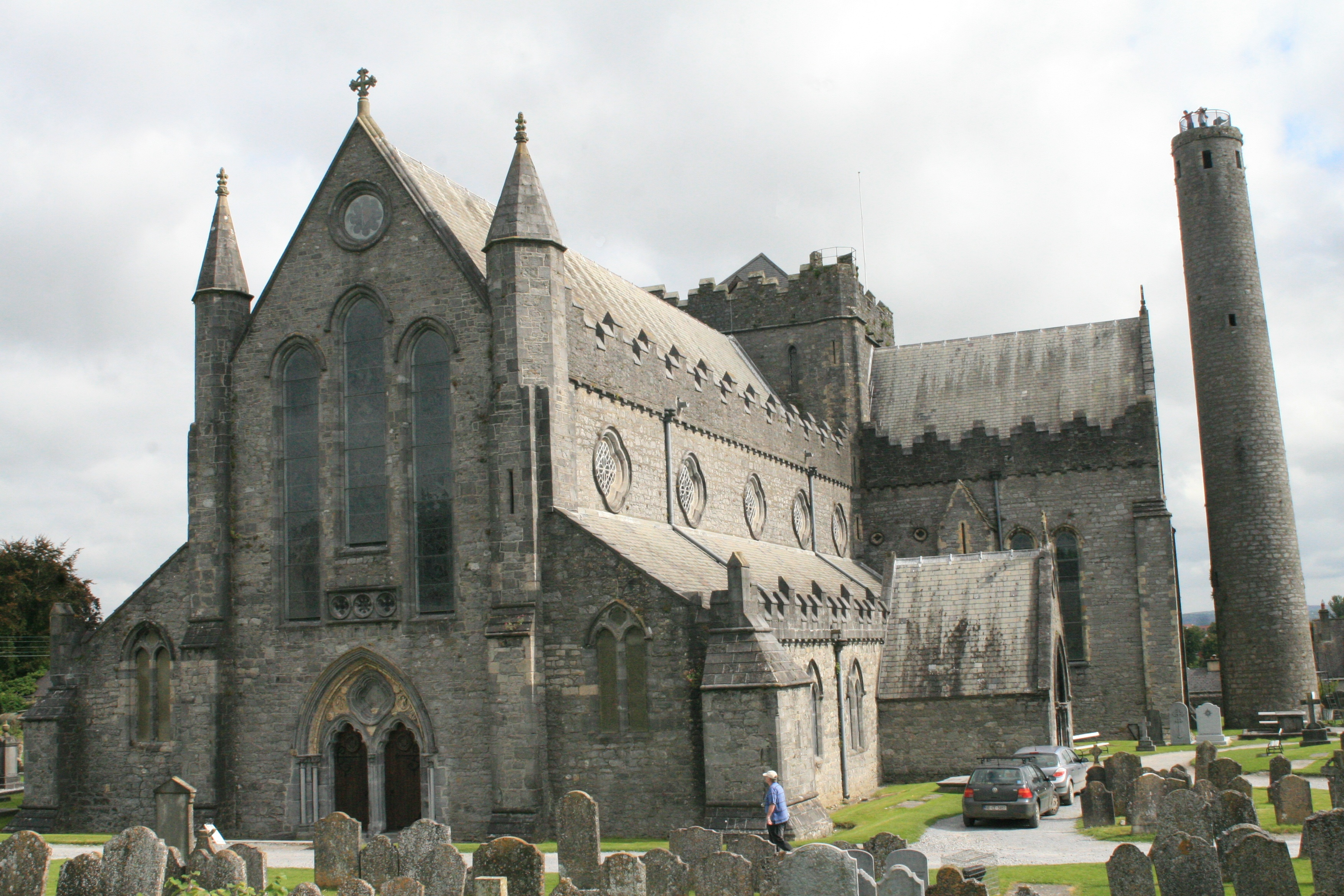
St. Canice's Cathedral

St Canice's Cathedral, also known as Kilkenny Cathedral, present building dates from the 13th century and is the second longest cathedral in Ireland. The cathedral is named after Saint Canice, who also gave his name to the town.

Cruciform, the cathedral was built in the Early English, or English Gothic, style of architecture, of limestone, with a low central tower supported on black marble columns. The exterior walls, apart from the gables, are embattled, and there are two small spires at the west end. The cathedral is seventy-five yards long, and its width along the transepts is forty-one yards.

Beside the cathedral stands a 100 ft 9th century round tower. St. Canice's tower is an excellent example of a well-preserved early Christian (9th century) Round Tower. Accessible only by a steep set of internal ladders, it may once have been both a watchtower and a refuge, and the summit gives a good view of Kilkenny and the countryside around. The hill on which the cathedral stands is believed to be the centre of the first major settlement at Kilkenny, and the round tower suggests an early ecclesiastical foundation.

Dominican Black Abbey was founded in 1225, and lying just off Parliament Street.

=== Bridges ===
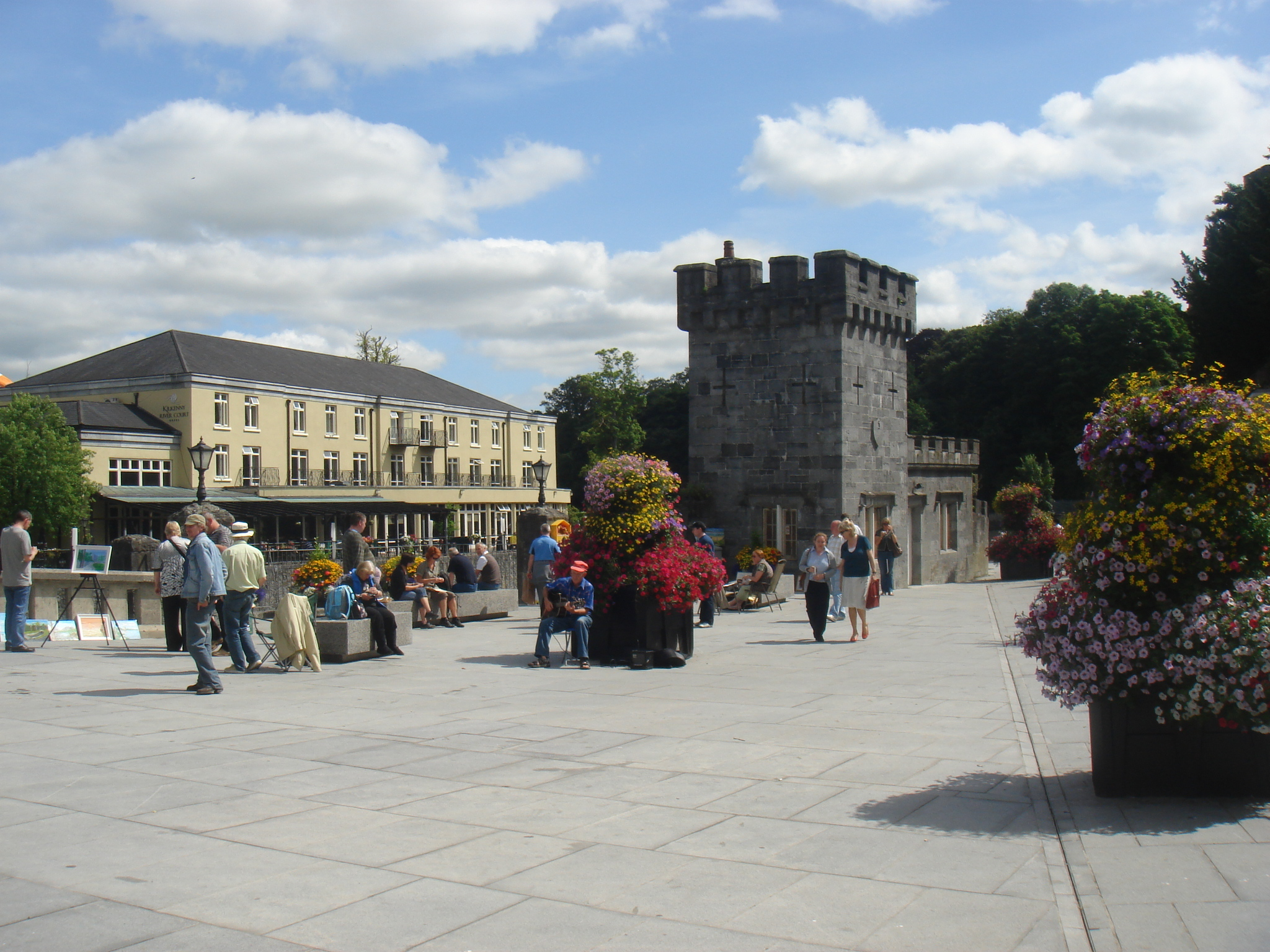
The New Canal Square

Kilkenny has four main bridges — Green's Bridge, John's Bridge, the Ossory Bridge and the St Francis Bridge – and two pedestrian/cycle bridges – the Lady Desart Bridge and the Ossory Pedestrian Bridge. Each of the bridges spans the River Nore.

Green's Bridge, also known as the 'Great Bridge of Kilkenny', crosses the River Nore in St. Canices Parish in the townland of Gardens, and is an important element of the architectural heritage of Kilkenny City. First built before 1200, the bridge has been rebuilt several times since the twelfth century due to flooding, including the great floods of 1487 and 1763. The present-day bridge was built in 1766 after the 'Great Flood of 1763'. It was built by William Colles (c. 1710–70) to designs prepared by George Smith (1763–67), a pupil of George Semple (c. 1700–82).

John's Bridge connects John Street to Rose Inn Street in Kilkenny City. It was first built after 1200, and has been called 'John's Bridge' since the Middle Ages. It has also been rebuilt many times since the twelfth century due to flooding. During the flood of 1763, people gathered on John's Bridge after Green's Bridge collapsed. John's Bridge also collapsed, and sixteen people died. The present-day John's Bridge was completed in 1910 and spans 140 ft (43 m) across the River Nore. It was reputedly, at the time it was completed, the longest single-span reinforced bridge in Ireland or Britain. The design was by Mouchel & Partners using the Hennebique system of reinforcement. The arch consists of three ribs, tapering from 2 ft 6 in (0.76 m) to 2 ft (0.61 m) deep. The traverse deck beams are each 2 ft (0.61 m) deep.

The Ossory Bridge, linking the ring road, was completed in 1984 and features an inlaid sculpture. St Francis Bridge was opened in May 2017, and forms part of the Kilkenny Central Access Scheme. The scheme and the proposed building of the new bridge was the subject of some debate and protest in Kilkenny in 2014.

Lady Desart Bridge and Ossory Pedestrian bridge are the city's two pedestrian/cycle bridges. Lady Desart Bridge was opened in January 2014 and links John's Quay and Bateman Quay and is located between John's Bridge and Green's Bridge. The Ossory Pedestrian bridge, located underneath the main Ossory bridge, links the Canal Walk on one side of the River Nore to the Lacken Walk on the other side.

=== Old Woollen Mills ===
The Old Woollen Mills was built in the 1800s and is located on the north side of the city, on Bleach Road. It was one of the largest employers in the area; the site covers 90,000 square feet (8,400 m^{2}) and has more than a mile of river frontage onto the Nore. Among its many features is a freestanding red brick chimney, erected in 1905. An architectural salvage and antique yard, Kilkenny Architectural Salvage, is currently located on the site.

== Culture ==
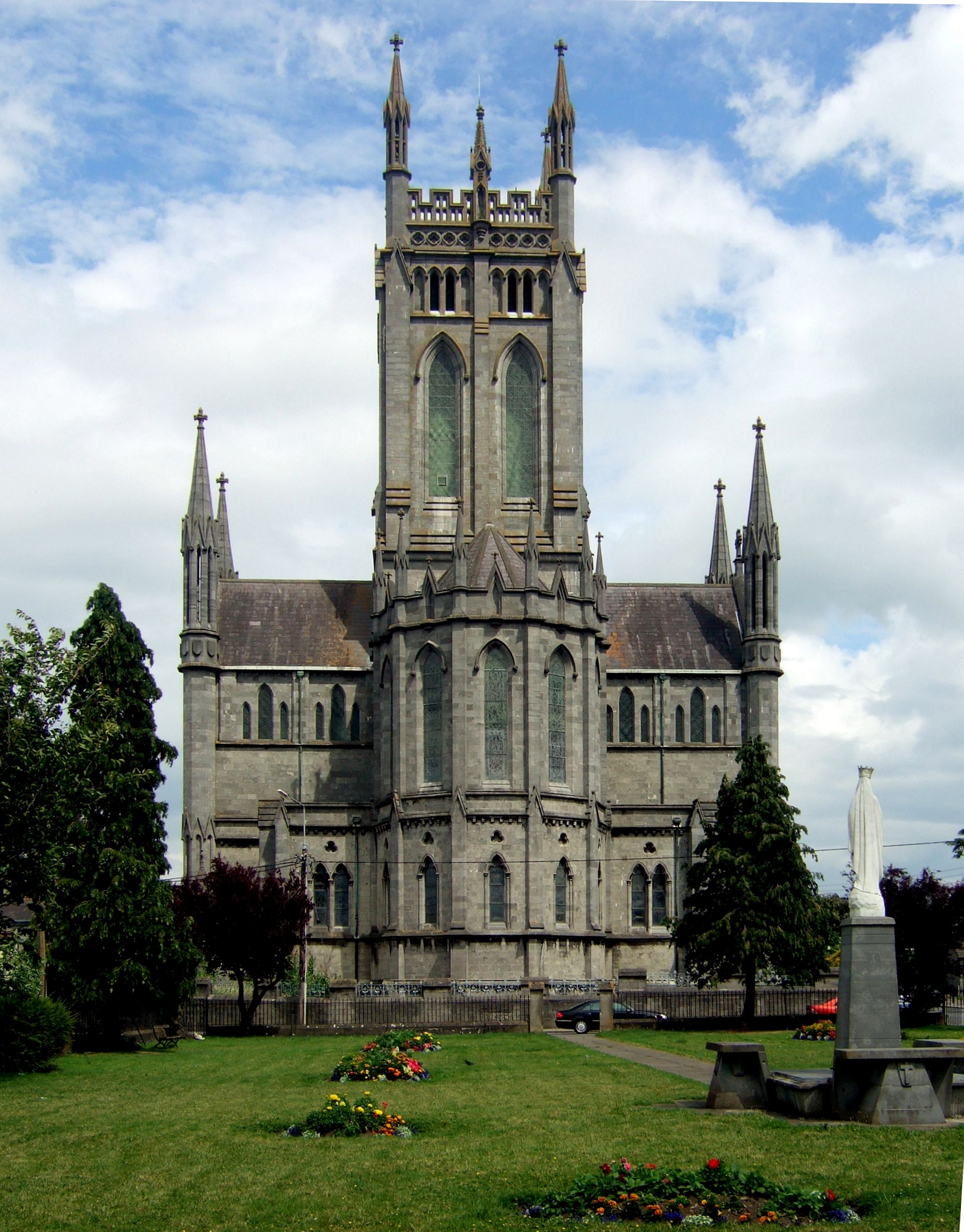
St. Mary's Cathedral, Kilkenny

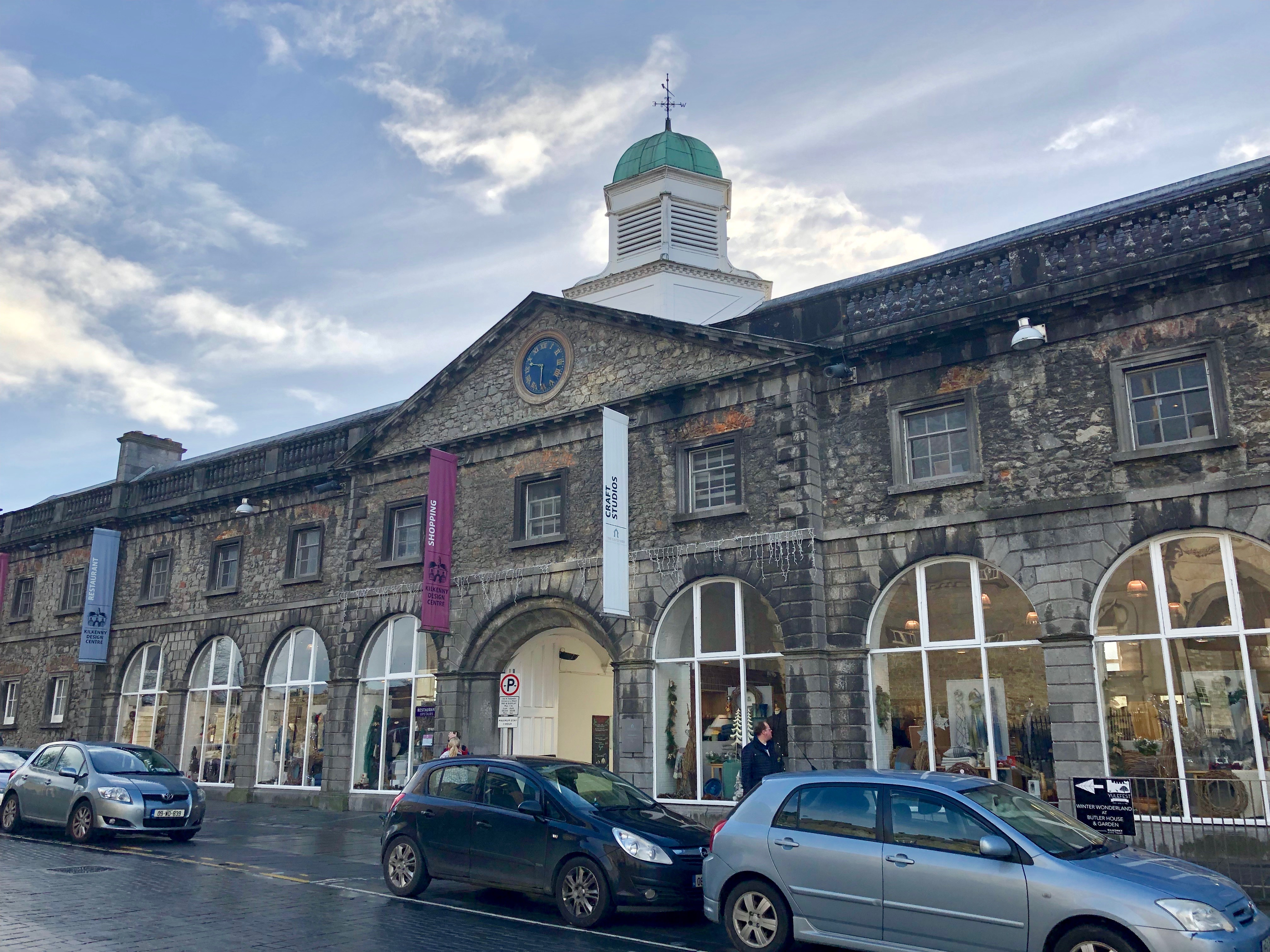
Kilkenny Design Centre

Kilkenny is a popular tourist destination in the South-East Region of Ireland. Its art galleries, historic buildings, craft and design workshops, theatre, comedy, public gardens and museums are some of the main reasons Kilkenny has become one of Ireland's most visited towns and a base from which to explore the surrounding countryside.

Points of cultural interest in the area include Kilkenny Castle, St. Canice's Cathedral and round tower, Rothe House, St. Mary's Cathedral, Kells Priory, Kilkenny Town Hall, Black Abbey and Butler Gallery. The latter re-opened in August 2020, having moved to a new location in Evan's Home from the former basement kitchen of Kilkenny Castle.

=== Arts and festivals ===
Kilkenny is a festival location throughout the year.

Kilkenny Tradfest takes place over the St. Patrick's Day weekend in March and includes the St. Patrick's Day festivities, the parade and the Tradfest music festival, which highlights Irish traditional and folk music.

The Kilkenny Roots Festival is held on the first weekend of May and features Americana/Bluegrass/Folk/Rockabilly/AltCountry artists in various indoor venues throughout the city. Since 1998 the festival has attracted musicians from the Americana/Roots genre, including Calexico, Giant Sand, Ryan Adams, Alejandro Escovedo, Guy Clark, Chuck Prophet, Ray LaMontagne, Richmond Fontaine, Rodney Crowell, Phosphorescent, Sturgill Simpson and Alabama Shakes.

Kilkenny hosts the annual Cat Laughs comedy festival every June bank holiday week.

The Kilkenny Arts Festival established in the 1970s takes place in late August. During this time Kilkenny plays host to contemporary art, with theatre, dance, visual art, literature, film, painting, sculptures and live performances. Musical events, including traditional, classical, world music and jazz, take place during the festival.

Savour Kilkenny is a food festival which happens in October every year. In November, Kilkenny stages Kilkenomics, the world's first economics and comedy festival. Venues such as the Watergate Theatre host a range of home-produced and touring performances in dance, music and theatre.

=== Music ===
Music groups from the Kilkenny area include traditional musicians as well as bands like Kerbdog, Engine Alley and My Little Funhouse. Other groups include R.S.A.G., whose double album Organic Sampler received a Choice Music Prize nomination for Irish Album of the Year 2008. Some pubs have Irish traditional music sessions. The Kilkenny Roots Festival takes place each May Bank Holiday weekend.

Kilkenny is mentioned in several songs, including in "When You Danced With Me" on ABBA's 2021 album Voyage.

The Kilkenny Arts Festival is held every August. A concert, 'Source', is held in Nowlan Park and has attracted musical performers such as Rod Stewart, Shania Twain, Bob Dylan, Paul Simon and Andrea Bocelli. Dolly Parton headlined at the 2008 event. Bruce Springsteen played 2 consecutive nights in July 2013 to finish the European leg of his World tour.

St Canice's Cathedral sometimes hosts classical musicians and choirs. The Kilkenny Choir and a gospel choir have performed in churches throughout the town. Groups like Ex Cathedra have played during the Kilkenny Arts Festival. Cleere's pub and theatre on Parliament Street are known for touring Irish and international bands including indie, jazz and blues. They also have a traditional music session every Monday night, as does Ryan's on Friary Street on Thursdays.

=== Theatre ===
Kilkenny had a tradition of dramatic performance going back to 1366 when the Dublin company set up in Kilkenny. Henry Burkhead printed a play in Kilkenny, Cola's Fury, or Lirenda's Misery (1645), dealing with events of the Irish Rebellion of 1641 from an English standpoint. It was a blatantly political work with the Lirenda of the title being an anagram of Ireland. In 1642, as a result of the English Civil War, Dublin Royalists were forced to flee the city. Many of them went to Kilkenny to join a confederacy of Old English and Irish that formed in that city.

In 1802 Sir Richard and Sir John Power of Kilfane established the Kilkenny Private Theatre.

The Watergate Theatre in Kilkenny is a centre for the performing and visual arts. It provides a varied programme of professional and amateur dramatics, classical and contemporary music, opera and dance, together with exhibitions of paintings and photographs. The Set Theatre is a smaller theatre located on John Street in Kilkenny.

=== Film ===
Award-winning animated studio Cartoon Saloon, as well as the film production companies Young Irish Film Makers and Mycrofilms, are all based in Kilkenny. Kilkenny has also hosted the Subtitle European Film Festival each November since 2012.

=== Media ===
==== Radio ====
KCLR radio station serves counties Carlow and Kilkenny. It is based at both the Broadcast Centre on the Carlow Road, Kilkenny and Exchequer House, Potato Market, Carlow. KCLR is available on 96FM and is an independent local radio station. As of 2009, KCLR had 60% weekly reach and 33% weekday share. KCLR 96FM began broadcasting in May 2004 replacing Radio Kilkenny.

Radio Kilkenny, which began as a pirate station Kilkenny Community Radio, received a licensed to broadcast to Kilkenny city and county on 96.0 MHz,96.6 MHz and 106.3 MHz in 1988. Radio Kilkenny had 63% of the radio listeners in County Kilkenny and 16% in County Carlow but failed to secure a franchise in 2003 when the Broadcasting Commission of Ireland changed the station's franchise area to include Carlow. The station ceased broadcasting at 2:10 a.m. on 1 January 2004.

Beat 102-103 is a regional youth radio station broadcasting across the South East of Ireland. It serves a population of about 450,000, and in August 2006 it had a 49% share of the southeast market.

==== Print media ====
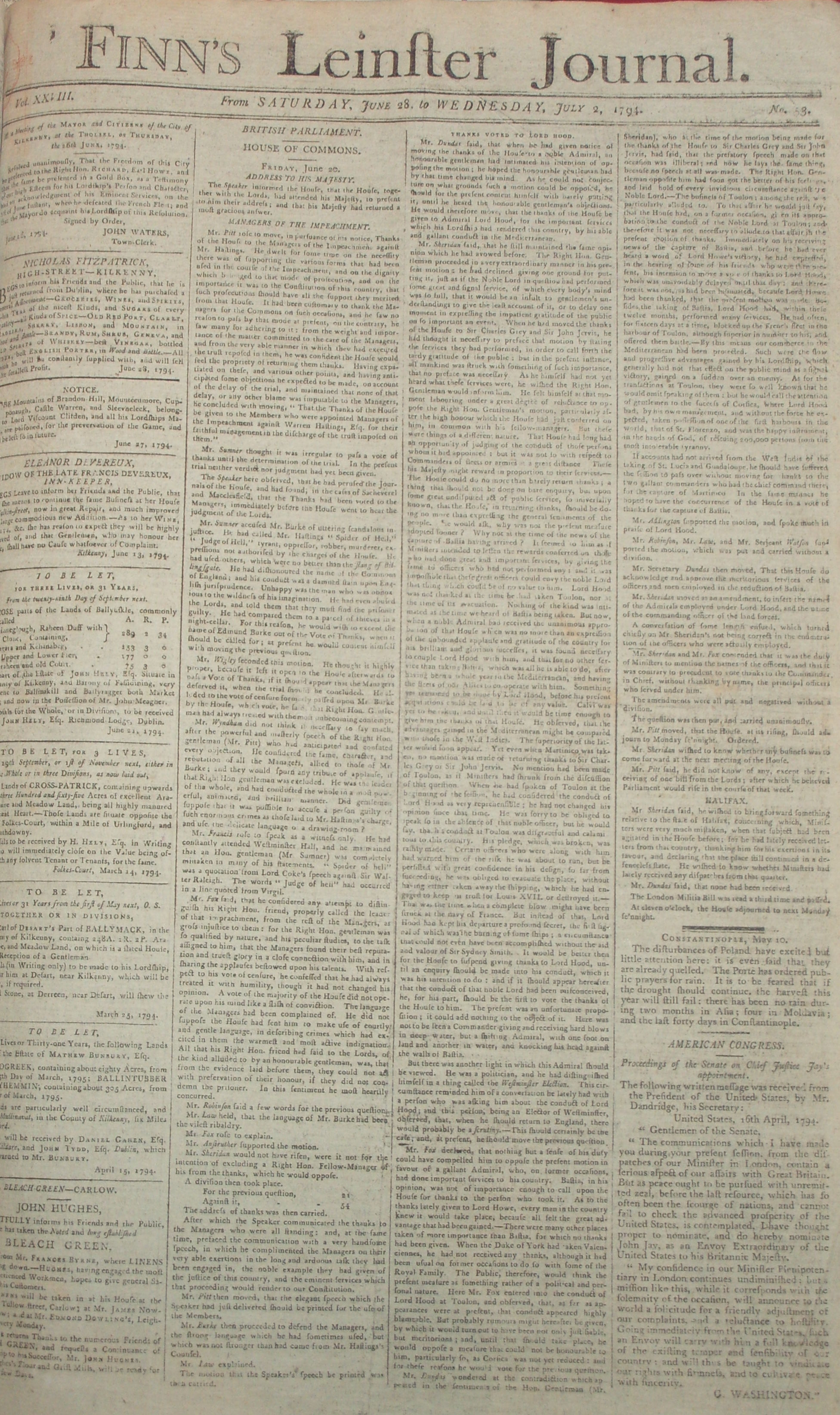
Finns Leinster Journal

Newspapers have been produced in Kilkenny for centuries. Longstanding examples include Finns Leinster Journal (later the Kilkenny Journal) from 1767 to 1965, the Kilkenny People from 1916 to 1992, and the Kilkenny Moderator from 1814 to 1916. (Note: Many are held in the Kilkenny Archaeological Society Library at Rothe House, others are available to view on microfiche at Kilkenny County Library) Other papers included the Leinster Independent from 1872; the Kilkenny Chronicle from 1813; the Kilkenny Courier; Tipperary Examiner from 1858; the Kilkenny Express and the Wexford Express from 1875; The Post (a sister paper to Kilkenny People) from 1926; the Kilkenny Standard from 1979, the Kilkenny People in 1895, The Kilkenny Voice (2005–2008) and also the Kilkenny Advertiser.

Finn's Leinster Journal (1767–1801) was founded by Edmund Finn in 1767. It was published in Kilkenny but some content was relevant to Carlow. It was continued as Leinster Journal (1801–1830) and the Kilkenny Journal from 1832.

The Moderator (1814–1822) changed its name to Kilkenny Moderator 1822–1919 and reverted to Moderator from 1920 to 1925.

The modern Kilkenny People was first published in 1895. It is a weekly paper. According to the Audit Bureau of Circulations, the Kilkenny People had an average weekly circulation of 17,578 for the first six months of 2006. It is printed by the Kilkenny People Group at Purcellsinch and the group also publishes a number of other regional papers.

==== Photography ====
Photographic Collections of Kilkenny include the Lawrence Collection c. 1900, the Crawford Collection c. 1940, the Valentine Collection c. 1950, the Bolton Street Students' Survey c. 1970, the Industrial Archaeologica Survey c. 1989, the Carrigan Collection and the St. John's Parish Collection, as well as many historical postcards.

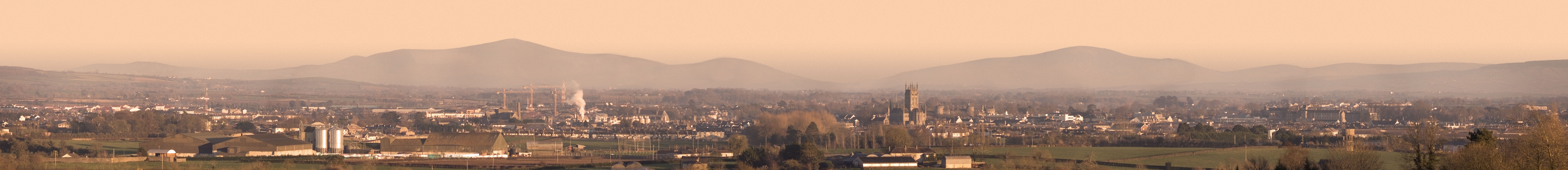
Panorama of Kilkenny

=== Community ===
==== Awards ====
Kilkenny was named as the Academy of Urbanism European Great Town for 2008. The Academy chairman, John Thompson, said: "it is great to have an Irish town coming through in this year's awards, especially Kilkenny which is coming to terms with economic growth without losing its wonderful character and humour". Kilkenny won the Irish Tidy Towns Competition in 1985.

==== Twinned cities ====
Kilkenny is twinned with Moret-sur-Loing in France, Formigine in Italy, and a town with the same name in Minnesota in the United States.

== Infrastructure ==
=== Education ===
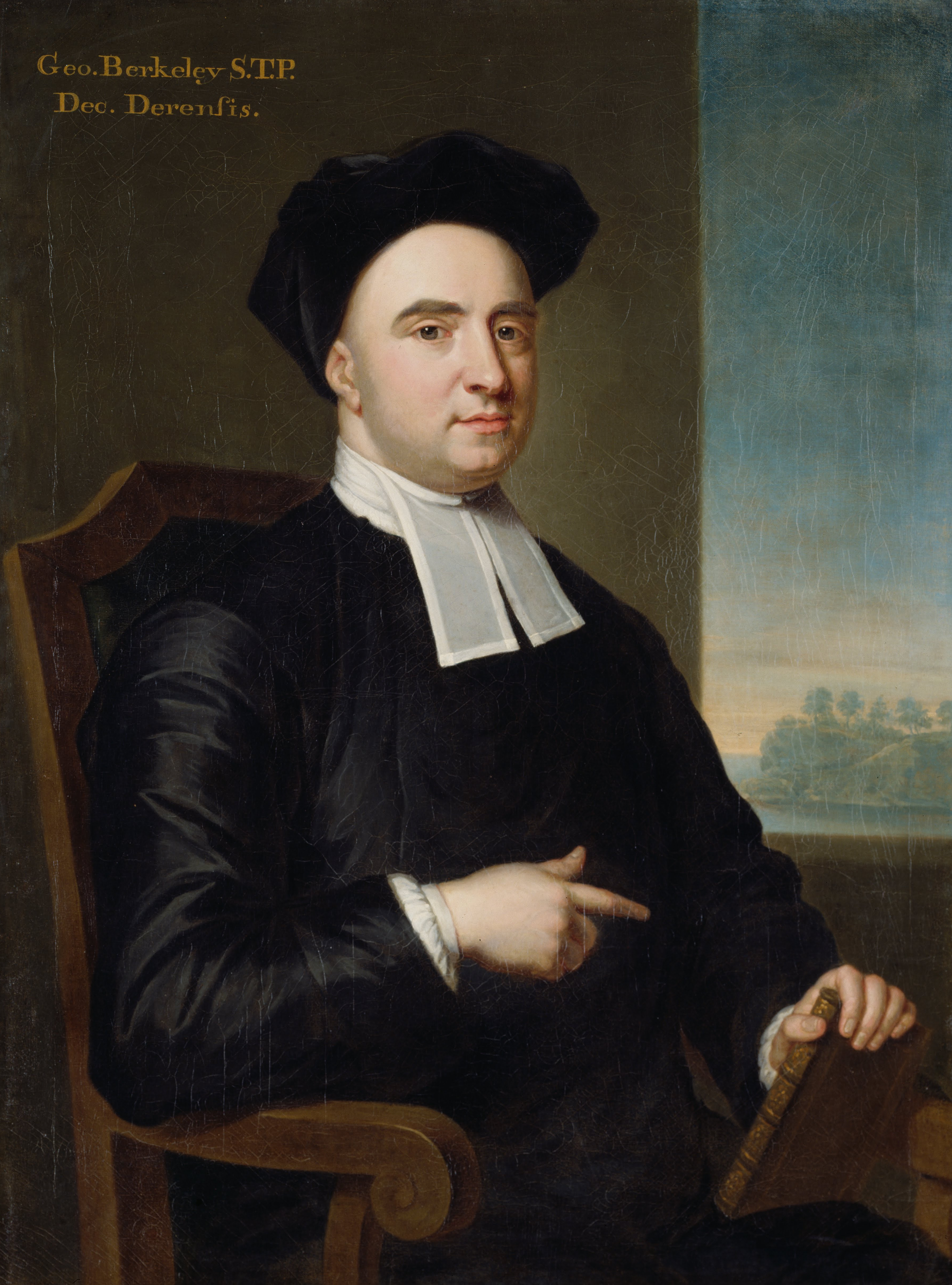
George Berkeley who attended Kilkenny College

Kilkenny is the home of many noted secondary schools, including the Church of Ireland Kilkenny College, founded in 1538. This is one of the oldest schools in the country, and its past pupils include Jonathan Swift and George Berkeley.

A quote from an article "The Berkeley Pavilion" by Patsy Dempsey – Bishop George Berkeley (1685–1753) was one of the great philosophers of his time. He was born near Kilkenny and lived in Dysart Castle, Thomastown. Berkeley studied at Kilkenny College (now County Hall) from 1696 to 1700, where Jonathan Swift was a predecessor.

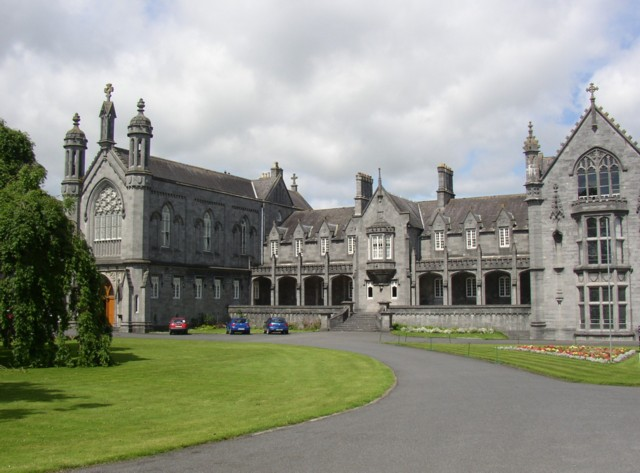
St Kieran's College Kilkenny

St. Kieran's College was founded in 1782 and was the first Roman Catholic secondary school in Ireland. It was created after Grattan's Parliament which permitted some relaxation of the penal laws in the country. St. Patrick's Industrial School, Kilkenny was founded in 1879, and closed in 1966. There are a number of other second-level schools, including Loreto Secondary School, CBS Kilkenny, Coláiste Pobail Osraí, Presentation College and the Kilkenny City Vocational School. Other schools located in the rural areas of the county are Castlecomer Community School, Colaiste Mhuire Johnstown, Scoil Airigeal Ballyhale, St. Brigid's Callan, Grennan College Thomastown and Callan CBS. These also are noted for their focus on the games of hurling and camogie. Gaelscoil Osrai an Irish school in Kilkenny, is the 2nd largest Irish-only school in Ireland with around 450 from Junior Infants to 6th Class.

Maynooth University maintained a campus at the grounds of St. Kieran's College from September 1997 until June 2018. The university offered the first year of full-time arts degrees in Kilkenny, with students attending second and third year courses on the main campus in Maynooth.

=== Roads ===
The national primary routes serving Kilkenny include the N10 (connecting to the M9 motorway Dublin/Carlow/Waterford route), the N77 (connecting to Portlaoise and the M7 motorway), and N76 (connecting to Clonmel).

=== Railway ===
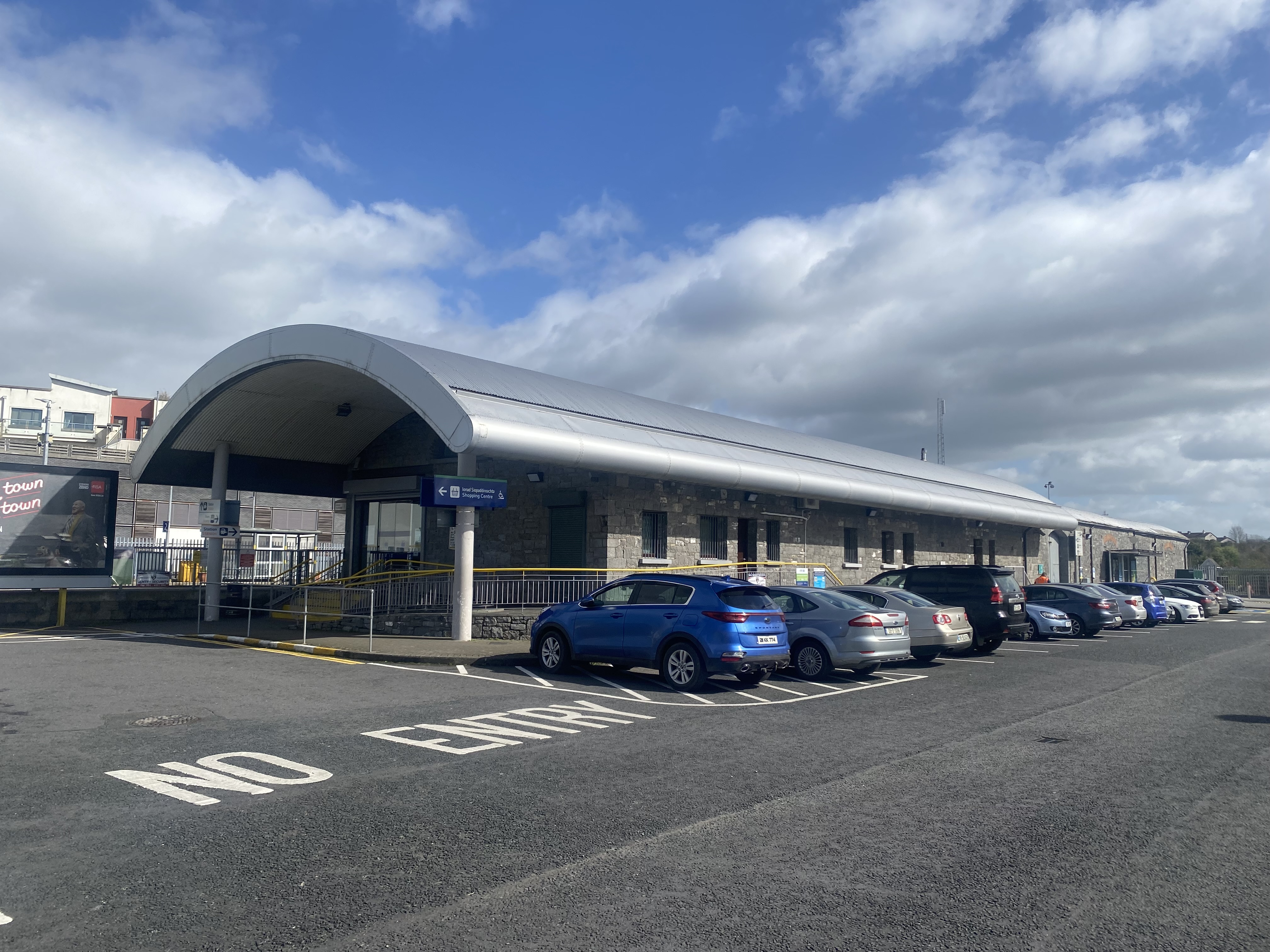
Kilkenny railway station

Kilkenny railway station opened on 12 May 1848. Kilkenny acquired railway links to Dublin in 1850, Waterford in 1854, Portlaoise in 1876 and Castlecomer in 1919. Córas Iompair Éireann closed the Castlecomer and Kilkenny Junction lines in 1962. Kilkenny railway station was renamed McDonagh Station in 1966 after the Irish nationalist, poet and playwright Thomas MacDonagh. Kilkenny is a stop on Iarnród Éireann's Intercity route between Dublin and Waterford.

From Kilkenny station trains run on the Dublin–Waterford railway line, providing connections in Waterford to Clonmel and stations to Limerick Junction. At Kildare connecting trains provide links to Ballina, Westport, Galway, Ennis, Ballybrophy, Nenagh, Limerick, Killarney, Tralee and Cork.

=== Air ===
Kilkenny Airport is only used for private flying. The nearest airports with scheduled services are Dublin Airport and Cork Airport, which are both in the region of 150 km away.

=== Industry ===
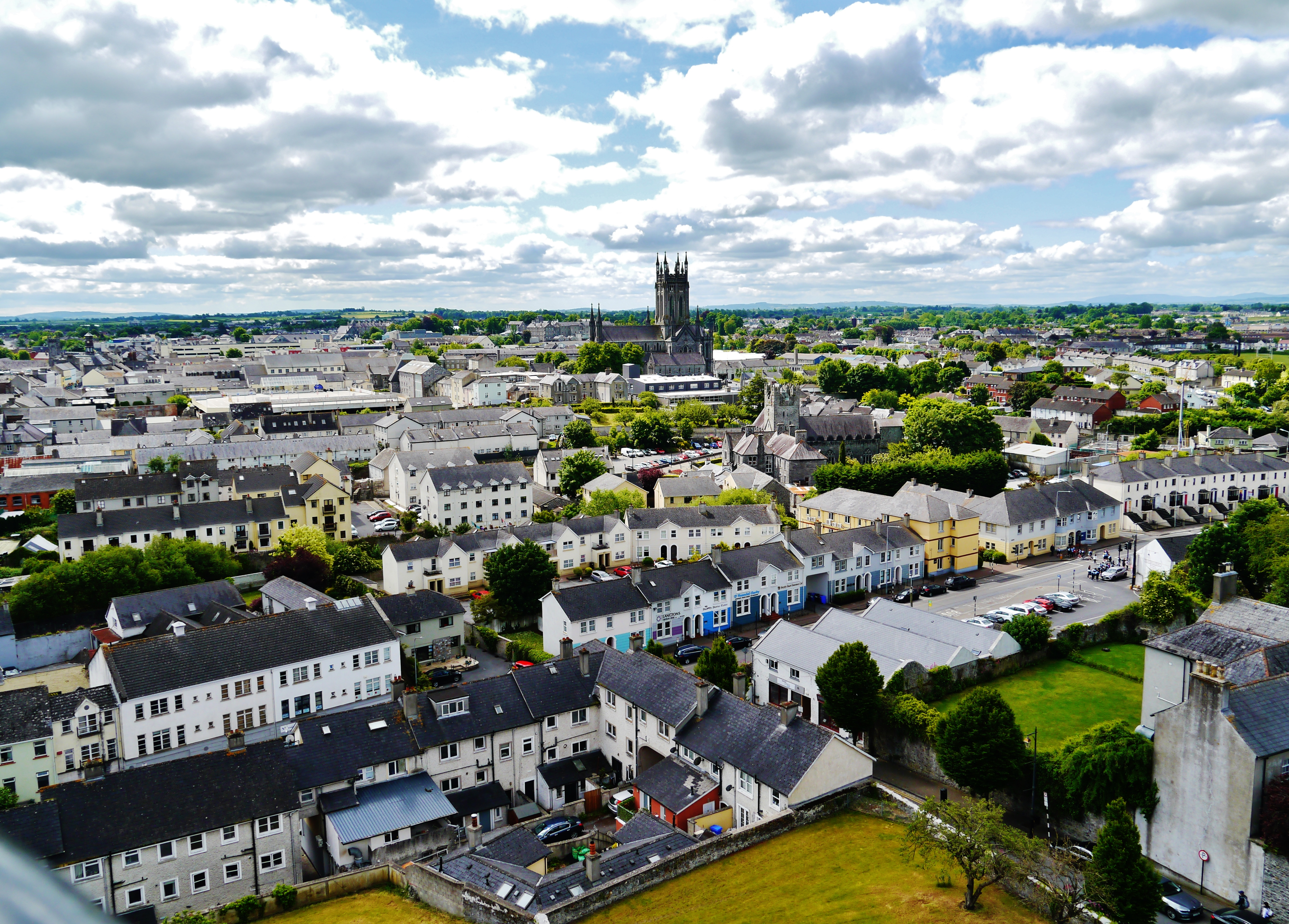
View of Kilkenny from St. Canice's Cathedral to St. Mary's Cathedral

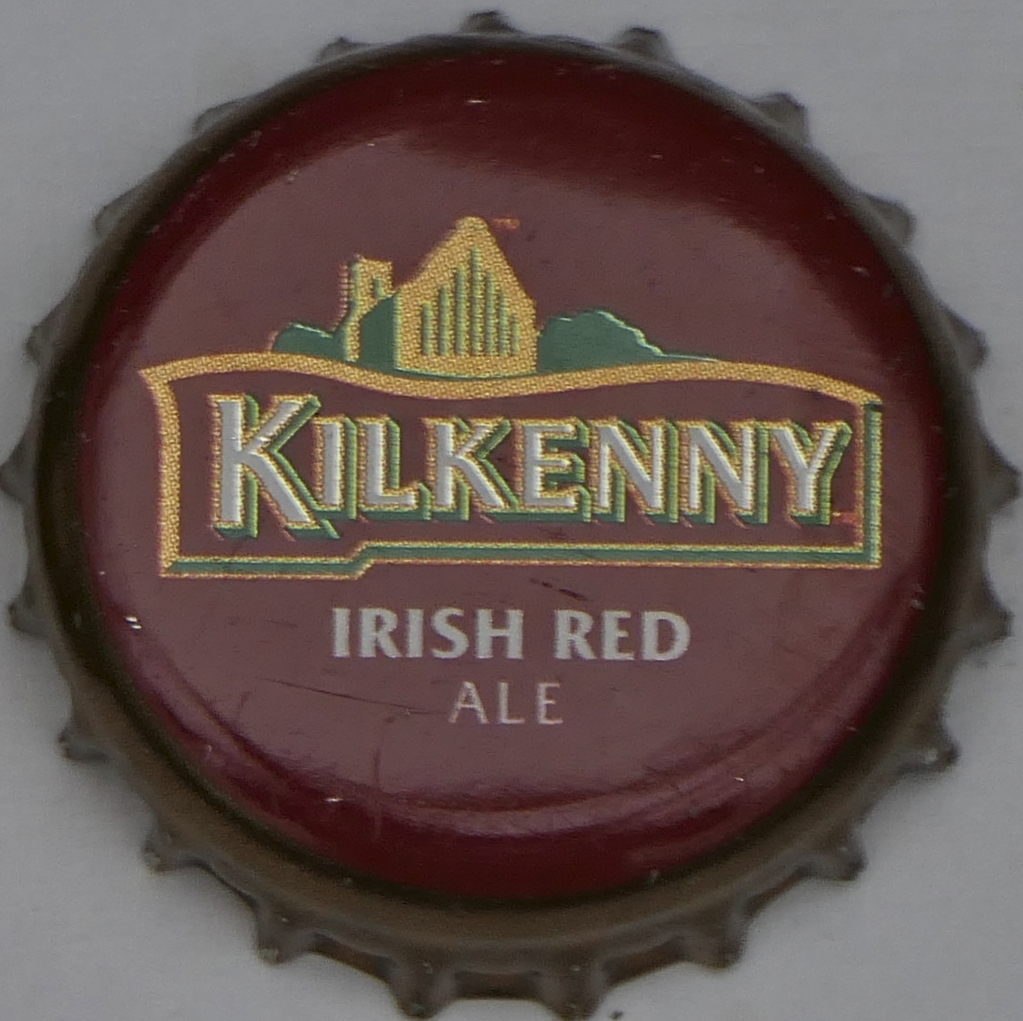
A sign for Kilkenny Irish red ale in Germany

The city has a history of brewing and was home to St. Francis Abbey Brewery (later Smithwick's), which was founded in the early 18th century by Messrs Cole and Smithwick. The Guinness Ireland Group owned this brewery since the 1960s. At the beginning of the 21st century, Guinness merged with Grand Metropolitan plc to form Diageo, the world's largest alcoholic beverage business, and the brewery became part of Diageo Global Supply. In its final years, Smithwick's ale formed only a small percentage of production there. Another product was Kilkenny ale, a close relation of Smithwick's ale. Some 80% of the beer produced at the brewery was Budweiser, a brand not owned by Diageo, but produced under licence. Diageo announced in May 2008 the closure of St. Francis Abbey Brewery, which took place on 31 December 2013. Production was then moved to St. James's Gate Brewery, Dublin.

==== Cooperatives ====
Kilkenny is also home to the head offices of Glanbia, one of the world's top dairy companies. Glanbia was formed by the merger of two dairy businesses: Avonmore and Waterford Foods and has interests in Ireland, the United Kingdom, the United States and more than 30 other countries.

County Kilkenny Village Creameries amalgamated to create the Avonmore Creameries brand in 1966. That coop became Avonmore Food plc in 1988 and joined with Waterford Food plc in 1997. It is today known as the global Food giant, Glanbia, one of the world's top nutrition companies, with revenues of over €3.5 billion and 5,815 employees.

In 1966 over 30 local creameries created by local farmers joined with other small rural co-operative societies throughout County Kilkenny and some neighbouring counties, and together with Unigate Limited support, formed the Avonmore Creameries Federation. According to the Glanbia Collections in Kilkenny Archives at St Kieran's College, Kilkenny, the Avonmore Coop brand was created through the merger of several dozen village creameries throughout County Kilkenny. Realising the benefits of increased scale and greater diversification in the 1960s, they saw the need for an amalgamation of many small, locally focused co-operatives across Ireland. It led to the construction of a new multi-purpose Avonmore dairy plant facility in Ballyragget, County Kilkenny, a plant they claimed was the biggest food processing facility in Europe at that time. Today that giant global entity is known as Glanbia. Glanbia has its origins in the Irish agricultural co-operative movement that evolved over the last century, ever since first Irish Co-operative founded by Horace Plunkett in 1889. Today Glanbia has operations in 34 countries and is exporting to more than 100 countries worldwide. Glanbia is ranked by revenue (2010 figures) in the top 100 Cooperatives, No 98 in the world and No 1 in Ireland by the International Co-operative Alliance, the global apex organisation of co-operatives worldwide.

The Ballyhale C.D.S. (1895–1995) 100th-anniversary booklet of its foundation records that a federation of 25 Co-op Creameries originally emerged in January 1965 under the umbrella of Avonmore Creameries Ltd., that shares were taken in the new entity by the society and that in following years a Ballyragget milk processing factory was built. Ireland entered the Common Market in 1970. The first bulk milk collection took place in 1973, when the amalgamation was formalised.

==== Other ====
Recent developments in Kilkenny have attracted further investment from local businesses as well as attracting new industries. Leggetsrath Business Park was opened in 2003. There are two retail warehouse parks in Kilkenny: Kilkenny Retail Park and Ormonde Retail Park. Hebron Business Park was constructed in 2002 and is a privately owned extension to the Hebron Industrial Estate, the main centre for industry in Kilkenny.

=== Hospitals ===
Hospitals in Kilkenny include three public hospitals and one private hospital. St. Luke's is a general medical and surgical hospital built in 1942. It is based on Freshford Road and provides a range of local and regional services. Local services include medical, general surgery, obstetrics, gynaecology and paediatrics. St. Canice's is a psychiatric hospital, opened in 1852 and located on the Dublin Road. It provides a range of mental health services including acute and long stay care, out-patient services throughout the county, addiction counselling services, respite care community hostel facilities and daycare facilities. It also provides paediatric physiotherapy, and occupational therapy. Kilcreene is the regional orthopaedic hospital outside the city in Kilcreene. Aut Even is a private hospital based outside Kilkenny City.

== Sport ==
=== Athletics ===
The Kilkenny City Harriers Club is an athletics club formed in 1953. In 1989 Kilkenny was designated as a local sports centre and an all-weather running track and facilities designed to meet International Association of Athletics Federations standards was begun. In 1992 the new track was officially opened and renamed Scanlon Park after Patrick 'Rusty' Scanlon, who had been associated with the old complex both as an athlete and as a soccer player.

=== GAA ===
The County Board of Kilkenny GAA (Irish: Cumann Lúthchleas Gael Coiste Cill Channaigh) has its head office and main grounds at Nowlan Park in the city. The Kilkenny branch of the GAA was founded in 1887.

Hurling is the dominant sport in the city and county, and Kilkenny has one of the most successful county hurling teams. Secondary schools noted for their contribution to the game include St. Kieran's College and Christian Brothers College (CBC). Former students who have played for St. Kieran's include Eddie Keher, Brian Cody, Eoin Kelly, DJ Carey and Henry Shefflin. There are three GAA clubs based in the city: O'Loughlin Gaels GAA, Dicksboro GAA and James Stephens (GAA Club). St John's Parish is the catchment area for O'Loughlin Gaels. The parishes of St Mary's and St Canice's are associated with Dicksboro. St Patrick's parish is the catchment area for the James Stephens club.

Gaelic football is also played in Kilkenny, although it is not as popular as it is in some other Irish counties. The Kilkenny footballers are the only county not to participate in the All-Ireland Senior Football Championship. They have previously taken gap years away from League football, and for example did not participate in 2013, after poor runs in 2012 and 2011.

=== Association football ===
Kilkenny City AFC played in the League of Ireland until January 2008. It entered the league as EMFA in 1986, but resigned its position in the league after 22 years citing "lack of finance, poor results and paltry attendances". The club had spent all but two seasons in the League of Ireland's second tier. Kilkenny and District Soccer League run leagues at schoolboy, youth and junior levels throughout the county. It is affiliated with the Leinster Football Association, Football Association of Ireland and the Schoolboy's Football Association of Ireland.

In 2015 Kilkenny United W.F.C. were admitted to the Women's National League, the top tier of women's football in Ireland.

=== Rugby ===
Kilkenny RFC founded in 1885, is a rugby union club based at Foulkstown on the Waterford Road. The club has provided a number players for the Ireland national team, including Jack Notley, Willie Duggan, Ned Byrne, Ronan Kearney and Gary Halpin. Ian Dowling plays for the Munster Rugby team and is a two-time winner of the European Rugby Cup in 2006 and 2008.

Rugby is played at schools level by Kilkenny College and Kilkenny Christian Brothers School (CBS).

=== Golf ===
Kilkenny Golf Club is an 18-hole championship parkland course within the city to the North West, close to the city centre. It has hosted several Professional Championship events. In 1984 and 1996, it was the venue for the All Ireland Mixed Foursome Finals, and in 1985 hosted the All Ireland Cups and Shields Finals. It is playable all year round due to sand-based greens. The course is mostly flat terrain with an abundance of trees.

Around Kilkenny City, there is also a Driving Range in Newpark and an 18-hole all-weather Par 3 golf course in Pocoke.

Mount Juliet Golf Course is a golf resort situated near Kilkenny in Thomastown. Jack Nicklaus designed the course, and it is considered to be one of Ireland's best courses.

=== Cycling ===
Kilkenny is home to two Cycling Ireland affiliated cycling clubs, Kilkenny Pedallers and Marble City Cyclers. Since 2016, Kilkenny has been the base for Rás na mBan, a women's cycling event which consists of six stages over five days to a total of over 400 km. Previous editions have featured stage finishes throughout County Kilkenny, including in Kilkenny city.

=== Ice hockey ===
Kilkenny City Storm is a mixed ice hockey team which was formed in 2007, and plays in the Irish Ice Hockey Association Recreational Division League. The team also has an inline hockey team, playing in the Northern Inline Hockey League and the Irish inline hockey (roller hockey) league.

== Notable residents ==
In Kilkenny: The Landed Gentry & Aristocracy, Art Kavanagh devotes a chapter each to eighteen of the most prominent Kilkenny families, chosen 'on a random geographical basis to ensure even distribution over the entire county', as follows: Agar of Gowran, Blunden of Castle Blunden, Bryan of Jenkinstown, Butler (Lords Carrick), Butler of Maidenhall, Butler (Lords Mountgarret), Butler (Earls of Ormonde), Cuffe (Lords Desart), De Montmorency, Flood of Farmley, Langrishe of Knocktopher, Loftus of Mount Juliet, McCalmont of Mount Juliet, Ponsonby (Earls of Bessborough), Power of Kilfane, Smithwick of Kilcreene, St George of Freshford and Wandesforde of Catlecomer.

== See also ==
- Switzer's Asylum, homes for the elderly
- Kilkenny Archaeological Society, Ireland's first historical society, founded in 1849
- List of towns and villages in Ireland
- List of townlands in County Kilkenny
- List of abbeys and priories in County Kilkenny
- Kilkenny (beer), a brand of beer produced by Guinness
- Kilkenny cat, nickname for a tenacious fighter
- Kilkenny (surname)
- National Reptile Zoo, Kilkenny
