= Mayor of Kilkenny =

The mayor of Kilkenny (Irish: Cathaoirleach) is an honorific title used by the head of The Municipal District of Kilkenny City. The Municipal District has jurisdiction throughout its administrative area which is the city of Kilkenny in the Republic of Ireland. The office was established in the 16th century and had significant powers. The office was all but abolished under the Local Government Act 2001. All that remains of the office, per section 11 of the Act is a symbolic role: "Subject to this Act, royal charters and letters patent relating to local authorities shall continue to apply for ceremonial and related purposes in accordance with local civic tradition but shall otherwise cease to have effect.". The Act goes on to state the chairman of the Council must be styled the Cathaoirleach and that "Any reference in any other enactment to the lord mayor, mayor, chairman, deputy lord mayor, deputy mayor or vice-chairman or cognate words shall, where the context so requires, be read as a reference to the Cathaoirleach or Leas-Chathaoirleach or other title standing for the time being." (section 31 (3)).

== History of the office ==
Kilkenny's first Council was elected in 1231 and since then Kilkenny has had a continuous record of municipal government. From the 13th century to the end of the 16th the chief magistrate was known as the sovereign, and since then mayor. The Cathaoirleach for the civic year 2012/2013 was Councillor Sean O' hArgain. John Coonan was elected mayor in 2020, succeeding Martin Brett.

=== List of sovereigns ===
- 1282 Richard Palmer
- 1289 Richard de Lega
- 1293 Alan Donninge
- 1295 Alan Donninge
- 1296 John White
- 1300 Robert de Edesor
- 1301 William Outlaw
- 1303 Robert de Edesor
- 1305 Alan Donninge
- 1307 John White
- 1310 William Outlaw, son of Alice Kyteler
- 1311 Henry Outlaw
- 1312 Alan Donnynge
- 1314 Phillip Croker
- 1315 Nicholas Croker
- 1316-17 John Godyn
- 1318 John Enocke (Eynow)
- 1319 John Godyn
- 1320 John Enocke
- 1321 Thomas de Ley
- 1322 John Enocke
- 1323-24 William Donninge
- 1326-28 William Fitz Geoffrey
- 1329 John Folyn
- 1330 Thomas Shortall
- 1331-32 Bartholomew Folyn
- 1333 Thomas Oweyn
- 1334 Walter FitzHugh
- 1335-36 Gilbert Fort
- 1337-38 John Cross
- 1339 Nicholas Bristow
- 1340 John Alyn
- 1341-43 John Cross
- 1345 Nicholas Bristow
- 1346-47 John Cross
- 1348 Thomas Venn
- 1349-50 John Enocke
- 1351 William Folyn
- 1352 John Enocke
- 1353 James Oweyn
- 1356 William Lofe
- 1357 John Rennell
- 1360 John Whyte de Ely
- 1364 John Enocke
- 1366 David Archer
- 1367-68 William Tirrell
- 1369 Robert Dencourt
- 1370 William Bristowe
- 1371 Oliver Knaresborough
- 1372 Robert Flood
- 1373 Robert Dencourt
- 1374-75 Robert Talbot
- 1376-77 David Archer
- 1379-80 Oliver Knaresborough
- 1381 Patrick Catermas
- 1383 John Cadde
- 1384-85 Nicholas Ley
- 1386 Robert Talbot
- 1387 John Lumbard
- 1388 Richard Norton
- 1389 Robert Folyn
- 1390 John Dyer
- 1391 John Chamberlain
- 1392 Thomas Knaresborough
- 1393 Thomas Taylor
- 1394 Phillip Cadde
- 1395 John Daniell
- 1396 William Stone
- 1397 Nicholas White
- 1398 William Stone
- 1399 Richard Talbot
- 1400 Thomas Knaresborough
- 1401 Robert Dullard
- 1402 Thomas Talbot
- 1403 Thomas Rothe, son of John Rothe
- 1404 Richard Talbot
- 1405 Roger Bernard
- 1406 John Marshall
- 1407 John Croker
- 1408-10 Nicholas Stokes
- 1411 Robert Taine
- 1412 John Shortall/Thomas English, alias Mownister
- 1416 John Lumbard
- 1417 Thomas Chamberlain
- 1418 John Marshall
- 1419 Thomas White
- 1420 David Girdler, alias Browne
- 1421 Robert Folyn
- 1422 Nicholas White
- 1424 John Coke
- 1425 William Archer
- 1427 John Knaresborough
- 1428 Maurice Stafford
- 1429 John Marshall
- 1430 Thomas English alias Mownister
- 1431 Nicholas Sutton
- 1432 John Knaresborough
- 1433 John Marshall
- 1434 William Archer
- 1435 William White
- 1438 John Archer
- 1440 John Roth(e)
- 1431 Walter Sherlock
- 1432 John Knaresborough
- 1433 Robert Savage
- 1434-35 John Whiteside
- 1436 Elias Archer
- 1449 John Rothe
- 1450 Patrick Sentleger
- 1451 John Knaresborough
- 1452 John Ragget(t)
- 1457 John Gerrot
- 1460 Thomas Sherlock for Elias Archer who refused to serve
- 1464 William Archer
- 1465 John Rothe
- 1466 William Archer Fitz Elias (i.e. son of Elias Archer)
- 1467-68 Walter Archer
- 1471 Patrick Daniell
- 1473 John Rothe
- 1475 Thomas Sherlock served for John Folyng of Drogheda
- 1477 John Whiteside
- 1482-83 John Knaresborough
- 1486 John Sherlock
- 1487 Robert Leonard
- 1489 Nicholas Ragget
- 1490 John Mothell
- 1491-92 Denis Maldony
- 1493, 1494, 1496 Robert Shee (died 1500 in the Battle at Moyaliff, Co. Tipperary)
- 1498 Peter Archer
- 1499 John Archer
- 1500 Thomas Marshall
- 1501 John Savage
- 1502 Walter Sherlock
- 1503 Patrick Archer
- 1504 William Kyrdow
- 1505 Robert Rothe
- 1506 Richard Rothe
- 1507 Walter Courcy
- 1508 Patrick Archer
- 1509 Robert Rothe
- 1510 Robert Rothe
- 1511 Thomas Langton
- 1512 Walter Sherlock Fitz Thomas
- 1513 Thomas Mothell
- 1514 Robert Rothe
- 1515 David Savage
- 1516 Walter Courcy
- 1517 Geoffrey Rothe
- 1518 Patrick Archer
- 1519 Thomas Mothell
- 1520 Peter Archer
- 1521 Peter Archer
- 1522 Richard Shee, son of Robert (see 1493), married to Joan Archer of New Ross
- 1523 Robert Rothe
- 1524 Thomas Shee
- 1525 Richard Rothe
- 1526 Nicholas Hackett
- 1527 John Walsh FitzLawrence
- 1528 Geoffrey Rothe
- 1529 Peter Walsh
- 1530 Thomas Shee
- 1531 John Rothe
- 1532 Richard Shee
- 1533 Geoffrey Rothe as locum tenens for Oliver Sentleger Lord of Tullchanbrog
- 1534 Nicholas Hackett
- 1535 Thomas Langton
- 1536 Richard Shee
- 1537 Robert Rothe
- 1538 John Walsh
- 1539 John Rothe
- 1540 Nicholas Cowley
- 1541 David Rothe
- 1542 Walter Archer
- 1543 Robert Shee, MP, son of Richard Shee (see 1522) and Joan Archer, married to Margaret Rothe, father of Sir Richard Shee and Henry Shee (see 1610)
- 1544 Walter Archer
- 1545 Walter Lawless
- 1546 David Rothe
- 1547 Francis Droone
- 1548 William Shee
- 1549 John Langton
- 1550 David Rothe
- 1551 Nicholas Cowley
- 1552 Robert Shee
- 1553 William Shee
- 1554 Walter Mothell
- 1555 John Marshall
- 1556 Walter Mothell
- 1557 John Langton
- 1558 Nicholas Garvey
- 1566 William Archer
- 1572 Helias (Elias) Shee
- 1577 Walter Archer
- 1578 Edward Langton
- 1579 Peter Shee
- 1580 John Archer
- 1581 Robert Shee
- 1582 Thomas Raghton (Rafter?)
- 1583-84 Arthur Shee
- 1585 Richard Ragget
- 1586 Arthur Shee
- 1589 Thomas Raghton (Rafter?)
- 1590 Walter Archer
- 1591 Arthur Shee
- 1592 Richard Ragget
- 1593 John Archer
- 1594 Helias (Elias) Shee
- 1595 Henry Shee (his coat of arms can still be seen in St. Kieran St, Kilkenny)
- 1596 Geoffrey Rothe
- 1597 Thomas Archer
- 1598 Edward Langton
- 1599 Helias Shee
- 1600 Henry Shee
- 1601 Patrick Archer
- 1602 Luke Shee
- 1603 Martin Archer (his coat of arms with the inscription "Insignia Martini Archer, Kilkenny, 1582." can still be found on a house on High St, Kilkenny)
- 1604 Edward Rothe
- 1605 John Rothe Fitz Piers of Rothe House, great-great grandson of Sovereign John Rothe 1440
- 1606 Nicholas Langton
- 1607 Edward Shee
- 1608 Thomas Ley

=== List of mayors since 1609 ===
- 1609 Thomas Ley (died 1629) until Michaelmas, then Robert Rothe
- 1610 Henry Shee, grandson of Richard (see 1522), married first to Frances Crisp and second to a lady White; built the house on High Street which is now the restaurant Paris Texas and still bears his and his wives' coat of arms
- 1611 Thomas Archer removed, then Patrick Archer, MP
- 1612 Edward Rothe
- 1613 John Rothe Fitzpiers of Rothe House, then Nicholas Langton (1562-1632)
- 1614 Edward Shee
- 1615 Luke Shee
- 1616 John Rothe Fitzpiers, then David Rothe
- 1617 Clement Raggett
- 1618 William Shee
- 1619 Clement Raggett
- 1620 Sir Cyprian Horsfall
- 1621 Walter Archer
- 1622 Walter Lawless
- 1623 Thomas Shee
- 1624 Walter Archer (died Jan. 1626), William Shee
- 1626 Michael Cowley
- 1627 Richard Rothe
- 1628 Henry Archer
- 1629 Peter Rothe (son of John Rothe Fitzpiers) of Rothe House (died 1654 in exile), MP, married to Letitia Lawless, daughter of Walter
- 1630 John Shea
- 1631 Marcus Shee, son of Sir Richard Shee
- 1632 William Shee
- 1633 Robert Shee, MP, son of Henry Shee and Dorothy Shee, great-grandson of Henry Shee (see 1610)
- 1634 Thomas Archer
- 1635 Richard Lawless, son of Walter Lawless
- 1636 James Cowley
- 1637 Nicholas Knaresborough, married to Rose Rothe
- 1638 George Shee
- 1639 Michael Archer Young
- 1640 George Shee
- 1641 Thomas Archer
- 1642 Patrick Murphy
- 1643 Walter Archer
- 1644 Peter Shee
- 1645 William Langton
- 1646 Jenkin Rothe
- 1647 Richard Shea FitzMarcus
- 1648 Robert Rothe
- 1649 James Archdekin
- 1650 Elias Shee
- 1651 Peter Rothe FitzEdward, MP died, replaced by ? Shee
- 1652 James Bjrogan (?)
- 1653 Elias Shee
- 1654-55 Daniel Axtell, military governor
- 1656 Abel Warren, MP
- 1657 Thomas Addams
- 1658 John Addams
- 1659 Thomas Evans
- 1660 John Joyner or Jaynor
- 1661 Thomas Evans
- 1662 Thomas Butler
- 1663 William Warden
- 1664-65 Peter Goodwin
- 1666-68 Thomas Evans
- 1669-70 Thomas Burrell
- 1671-72 William Connell
- 1673-75 Josias Haydock
- 1676-77 Francis Rowledge
- 1678 Joseph Cuffe
- 1679 Arthur Helsham died / Thomas Young
- 1680 John Baxter
- 1681 Samuel Phillips
- 1682 Bartholomew Connor (?)
- 1683 Thomas Butler
- 1684 Thomas Longueville
- 1685-86 Richard Connell, MP
- 1687-88 John Rothe (Catholic), MP
- 1689 John Archdekin
- 1690 July-91 John Baxter
- 1692-93 Joshua Helsham
- 1694-95 Ebenezer Warren, MP
- 1696 John Pape
- 1697 Isaac Mukins
- 1698 Thomas Phillips
- 1699 George Birch
- 1700 Abel Butler
- 1701 Josias Haydock
- 1702 John Blunden
- 1703 Patrick Connell
- 1704 William Earl of Inchiquin
- 1705 John Hamilton
- 1706 John Garnett
- 1707 Adam Haydock
- 1708-09 Stephen Haydock
- 1710 Robert Connell
- 1711 William Baxter
- 1712 Edward Evans
- 1713 Thomas Blunt
- 1714 William Baxter
- 1715 James Agar
- 1716 John Birch
- 1717 John Dessaroy
- 1718 John Cooksey
- 1719 John Blunden
- 1720 Enoch Collier
- 1721 John Cuffe
- 1722 Richard Phillips
- 1723 Thomas Sandford of Sandfordscourt
- 1724 Edward Warren
- 1725 Arthur Helsham
- 1726 Thomas Butler
- 1727 Thomas Barnes
- 1728-29 John Blunden (c. 1695 – 1752)
- 1730 Stephen Haydock / Edward Warren
- 1731 William Gore, MP
- 1732 Edward Evans
- 1733 Edward Warren, MP
- 1734 Henry Evans
- 1735 Richard Butler
- 1736 Algernon Warren
- 1737 George St. George of Kilrush
- 1738 Thomas Butler
- 1739 Arthur Helsham
- 1740 William Gore (1703–1748)
- 1741 Ebenezer Lodge
- 1742 Anthony Blunt
- 1743 Barry Colles
- 1744 Samuel Matthews
- 1745-46 Ambrose Evans
- 1747 Joseph Evans
- 1748 Joseph Blunt
- 1749 Ambrose Evans
- 1750 Ebenezer Lodge
- 1751 Ralph Gore
- 1752 Harvy Morres
- 1753 John Blunden (c.1718-1783), MP
- 1754 William Evans Morres, MP
- 1755 William Colles, father of Abraham Colles
- 1756 George Carpenter
- 1757 James Percival
- 1758 Thomas Butler
- 1759 Charles Gore
- 1760 Anthony Blunt
- 1761 Thomas Wilkinson
- 1762 Anthony Blunt
- 1763 John Blunt
- 1764 Francis Lodge
- 1765 Barry Colles
- 1766 Haydocke Evans Morres, MP
- 1767 Thomas Butler
- 1768 John Watters
- 1769 Christopher Hewetson
- 1770 Anthony Blunt the younger
- 1771 Otway Lord Desart
- 1772 Francis Lodge
- 1773 Ralph Gore
- 1774 Thomas Mossom
- 1775 John Watters
- 1776 Patrick Welch, MP
- 1777 Clayton Bayly
- 1778 John Earl of Wandesford
- 1779 Otway Lord Desart
- 1780 Thomas Butler
- 1781 Henry Geale
- 1782 Bibby Hartford
- 1783 Edward Evans
- 1784 Edmund Butler
- 1785 Patrick Welch
- 1786 Edmund Butler
- 1787 Patrick Welch the younger, MP
- 1788 James Wemys
- 1789 Henry Shearman
- 1790 Robert Edmonds
- 1791 Patrick Welch the elder
- 1792 Edmund Butler
- 1793 Robert Edmunds
- 1794 James Wemys
- 1795 Robert Edmonds
- 1796 William Wilkinson
- 1797 William Kingsmill
- 1798 Robert Edmonds
- 1799 William Pitt Blunden
- 1800 Robert Edmonds
- 1801 Sir John Blunden
- 1802 John Enery
- 1803 Samuel Matthews
- 1804 John Helsham
- 1805 Rev. Edward Herbert
- 1806 Walter, Earl of Ormonde
- 1807 The Hon. Hamilton Cuffe
- 1808 The Hon. James Butler
- 1809 John Otway Cuffe, 2nd Earl of Desart
- 1810 George Rothe
- 1811 James Wemys
- 1812 William Bayly
- 1813 Samuel Matthews
- 1814 The Hon. James Butler
- 1815 Rev. Nicholas Herbert
- 1816 The Hon. Charles Butler
- 1817 Samuel Madden
- 1818 John Kinchela
- 1819 William Hartford
- 1820 Nathaniel Alcock
- 1821 Henry Wemys
- 1822 Joseph Bradish
- 1823 Sir Jonah Wheeler Denny Cuffe
- 1824 Joseph Greene
- 1825 Charles Madden
- 1826 Christopher Humfrey / Joseph Bradish
- 1827 William Kingsmill / Charles Madden 1868 William O'Donnell
- 1828 Nathaniel Alcock
- 1829 William Oliver Wheeler
- 1830 Henry Gore
- 1831 William Robertson
- 1832 Thomas Cronyn
- 1833 John McCraith
- 1834 William Grace
- 1835 Parr Kingsmill
- 1836 Redmond Reade first Roman Catholic Mayor since 1690)
- 1837 Richard Sullivan
- 1838 Thomas Pack
- 1839 William Shanahan
- 1840 Lewis Chapelier Kinchela Sr.
- 1841 Lewis Chapelier MD
- 1842-43 James Burnham
- 1844 Edmond Smithwick
- 1845 Robert Cane (1807–1858)
- 1846 Joseph Hackett
- 1847 Henry Potter
- 1848 Thomas Hart
- 1849 Robert Cane
- 1850 Michael Banim
- 1851 Michael Hyland
- 1852 Daniel Cullen
- 1853 John Potter
- 1854 Michael Sullivan
- 1855 James M. Tidmarsh
- 1856 William Lanigan
- 1857 Daniel Smithwick
- 1858 Patrick Moran
- 1859 Matthew Rowan
- 1860 Edmund Murphy
- 1861 Thomas Power
- 1862-63 Alexander Colles
- 1864-65 Edmond Smithwick
- 1866 John Feehan
- 1867 John Buggy
- 1868 William O'Donnell
- 1869 William Healy
- 1870 James W. Sullivan
- 1871 William Hayden
- 1872-73 William Kenealy
- 1874 Patrick Murphy
- 1875 Simon Morris
- 1876 Peter McDermott
- 1877 Arthur M. Mahon
- 1878 Daniel McCarthy
- 1879 James S. Loughlin
- 1880 Andrew Dowling
- 1881 Patrick Maher
- 1882 Simon Morris
- 1883 John Hogan
- 1884 John E. Smithwick, MP (1844-1913)
- 1885 William O'Donnell
- 1886 James Walsh
- 1887-88 Patrick M. Egan, father of the playwright Michael Egan
- 1889 John Coyle
- 1890 David Fenton
- 1891 Michael Kennedy
- 1892 Patrick Rowan
- 1893 Cornelius Quinn
- 1894-95 Patrick J. Morrissey
- 1896 Major O'Leary
- 1897 Thomas Cantwell
- 1898 John A. Healy
- 1899 Patrick J. O'Keeffe
- 1900-1901 Joseph Purcell
- 1902-03 Patrick Hoyne
- 1904-05 Edward O'Shea
- 1906 Edward McSweeney
- 1907-08 Captain Otway Cuffe
- 1909-10 Michael J. Potter
- 1911 Thomas Cantwell
- 1912-13 Joseph Purcell
- 1914-16 John Magennis
- 1917-18 John Slater
- 1919-24 Peter DeLoughrey
- 1925-27 James Reade
- 1926 James Reade
- 1927 James Reade
- 1928 John Magennis
- 1929-1930 John G. Duggan
- 1931 T.J.D. O'Hanrahan
- 1932-34 Michael McSweeney
- 1935-36 Patrick Bryan
- 1937-38 John Magennis
- 1939-42 Raymond Crotty
- 1943-44 Commissioner
- 1945-46 Patrick J. Crotty
- 1947 James P. Pattison
- 1948 Thomas J. DeLoughrey
- 1949 James Monahan
- 1950-51 John Leahy
- 1952-55 Patrick Gleeson
- 1956 John J. Holohan
- 1957-58 Michael J. McGuinness
- 1959 John J. Holohan
- 1960 Seamus Monahan
- 1961 John J. Holohan
- 1962 Patrick Kinchella
- 1963-64 Tomás Ó Dubhshláine
- 1965-66 Michael J. McGuinness
- 1967 Thomas Martin
- 1968 John J. Holohan
- 1969-70 Margaret Tynan (First woman elected Mayor)
- 1970 Margaret Tynan
- 1971 Kieran Crotty
- 1972 Kieran Crotty
- 1973 Michael J. McGuinness
- 1974 Thomas Martin
- 1975 John J. Holohan
- 1976 Seamus Pattison
- 1977 Margaret Tynan
- 1978 Luke Boyle
- 1979 Thomas Martin
- 1980 Kieran Crotty
- 1981 Luke Boyle
- 1982 John J. Holohan
- 1983 Thomas Crotty
- 1984 Michael J. McGuinness
- 1985-88 Margaret Tynan
- 1989-90 Kieran Crotty
- 1991 Thomas Crotty
- 1992 Seamus Pattison
- 1993 Michael J. McGuinness
- 1994 Michael Lanigan
- 1995 Kieran Crotty
- 1996 John J. McGuinness, son of Michael J. McGuinness
- 1997 Margaret Tynan
- 1998 Tomás Ó Dublshláine / John Bolger
- 1999 Tony Patterson
- 2000 Paul Cuddihy
- 2001 Joe Cody
- 2002 Betty Manning
- 2003 Pat Crotty
- 2004 Martin Brett
- 2005 Marie Fitzpatrick
- 2006 Martin Brett
- 2007 Marie Fitzpatrick
- 2008 Pat Crotty
- 2009 Malcolm Noonan (Green Party)
- 2010 Martin Brett
- 2011 David FitzGerald
- 2012 Sean O' hArgain
- 2013 Martin Brett
- 2014 Andrew McGuinness, son of John J. McGuinness
- 2015 Joe Malone
- 2016 Patrick O'Neill (Fine Gael)
- 2017 Michael Doyle (Fine Gael)
- 2018 Peter "Chap" Cleere (Fine Fáil)
- 2019 Martin Brett
- 2020 John Coonan
- 2021 Andrew McGuinness
- 2022 David FitzGerald
- 2023 Joe Malone
- 2024 Andrew McGuiness
- 2025 John Coonan
- Andrew McGuiness

== See also ==
- List of cities in Ireland
- Lord Mayor of Dublin
- Lord Mayor of Cork
- County Kilkenny
