= Richard Shee =

Sir Richard Shee
- Born: c.1550
- Died: 1608; Bonnetstown, County Kilkenny
- Education: Gray's Inn, King's Inns
- Occupations: Lawyer, Politician, Deputy Lord Treasurer
- Spouses: Margaret Sherlock; Margaret Fagan
- Children: Robert, Lucas, Thomas, John, Marcus, Lettice, Katherine, Margate, Isabel
- Parents: Robert Shee; Margaret Rothe

Sir Richard Shee (c. 1550 - 1608) was an Irish lawyer, politician, and Deputy Lord Treasurer of Ireland. He was a prominent member of the ruling class in Kilkenny city. He is best remembered for his influence on the architecture of Kilkenny city through his founding of the Shee Alms House in Rose Inn Street, Kilkenny, and for his ornate tomb in Saint Mary's Church.

== Family background ==
The Shee family were descended from Gaelic lords Clan Ua Seaghdha in the Iveragh peninsula in County Kerry, in southwestern Ireland. During the 14th century they moved to Tipperary and then on to Kilkenny where Richard Shee's grandfather Robert O'Shee rose to prominence and was recorded as being sovereign of Kilkenny city.

Richard Shee was an important member of the prominent Shee family of Kilkenny as noted by archaeologist Cóilín Ó Drisceoil:

The O’Shees became firm allies of the ruling Butler (Ormonde) family and this Robert died in battle in 1500 whilst fighting under their standard. The close relationship with the Butler family guaranteed success for the Shee family politically, financially and culturally which today is reflected in a legacy of architectural and sculptural heritage in Kilkenny city – the Shee Alms house, domestic houses, a now destroyed wayside cross and their funeral monuments.

== Biography ==
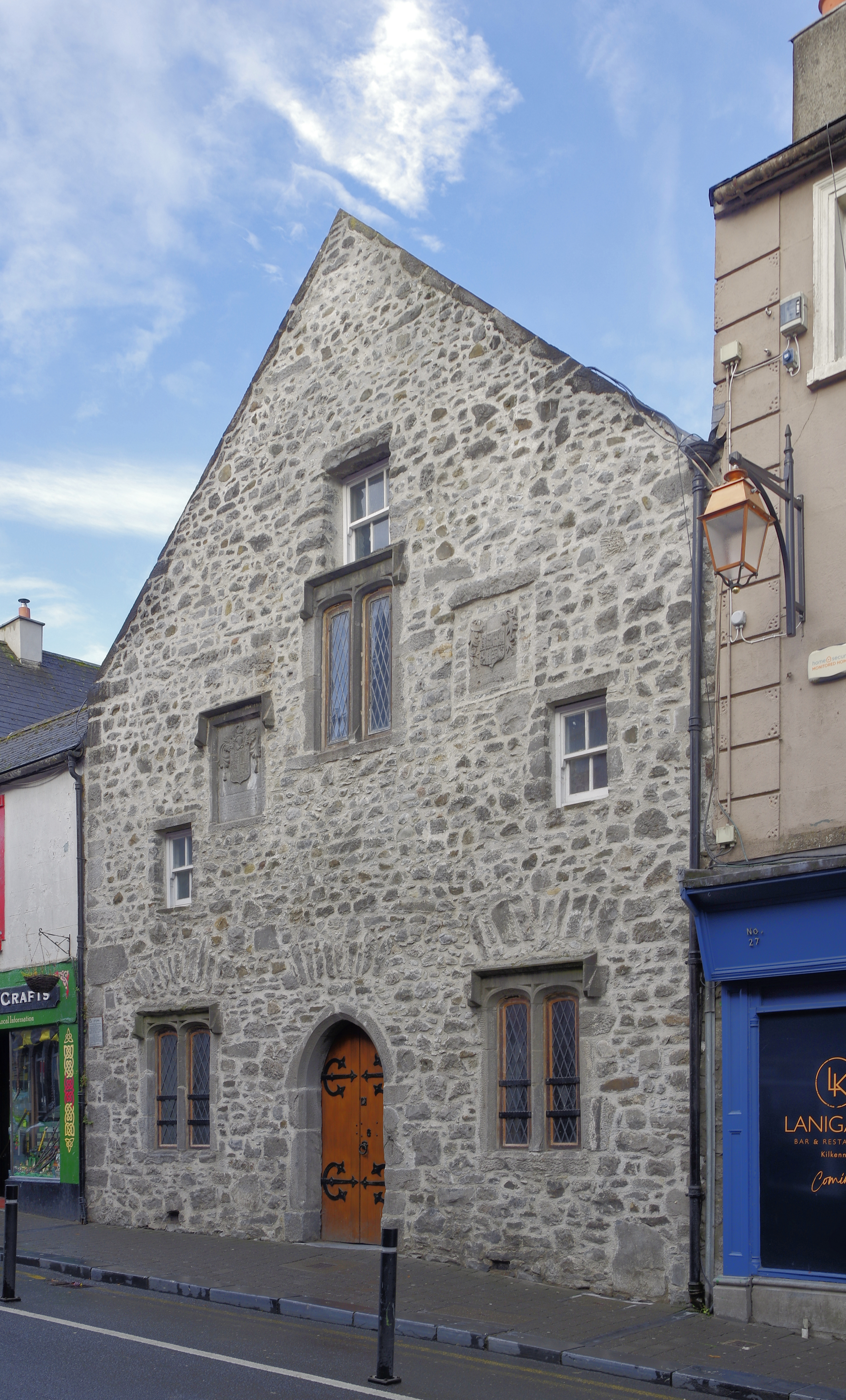
Shee Almshouse, Kilkenny.

Richard Shee was the eldest son of Robert Shee (Sovereign of Kilkenny 1545-46, 1553–54; M.P. for Kilkenny in 1559) and his wife Margaret Rothe, sister of John Rothe of Rothe House, also souvereign and mayor of Kilkenny.

Shee pursued a career in law, first as a student of Gray's Inn and later as a bencher of the King's Inns. He was also seneschal of Kilkenny's Irishtown district in 1568. Bishop of Ossory Christopher Gafney granted him the manor of Uppercourt in County Kilkenny in 1570, and in the following year he was made Treasurer of the regalities of Tipperary in 1571 and in 1576 he was made Deputy to the Lord Treasurer of Ireland. This led to his knighthood sometime shortly after 1582. He worked closely with Thomas, Earl of Ormonde throughout his legal career which led to him greatly increasing his property holdings and wealth.

Richard Shee founded the Hospital of Jesus of Kilkenny, but popularly known as the Shee's Alms House in Rose Inn Street, Kilkenny which still stands today and was used for as the Tourist Information Office.

Richard Shee died on 10 August 1608 in his residence in Bonnetstown, a short distance outside of Kilkenny City.

== Wives and children ==
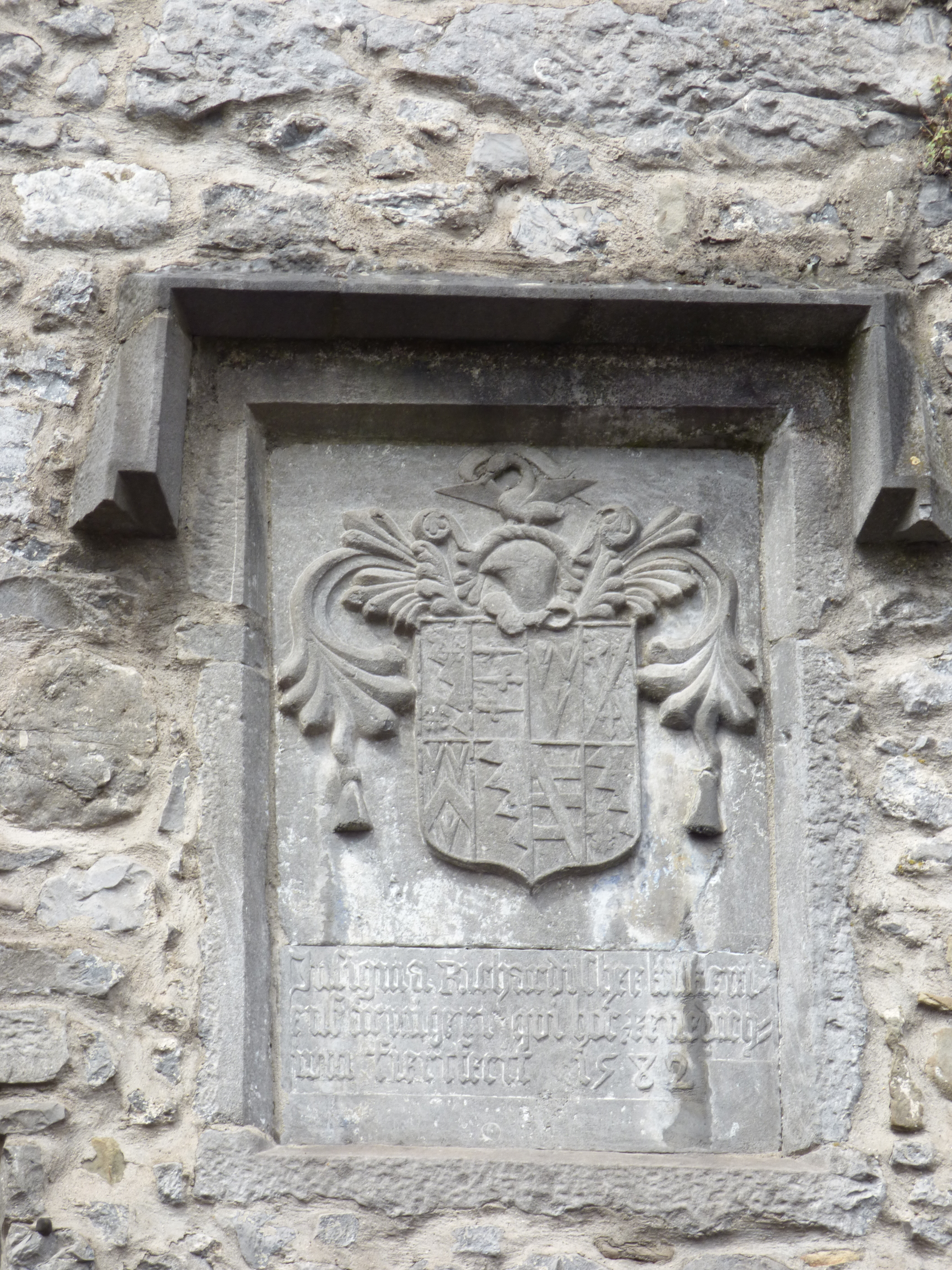
Richard's Coat of arms on Shee's Almshouse in Kilkenny

Shee was married twice, first to Margaret Sherlock of Waterford, and then to Margaret Fagan of Dublin. He had no children by his second wife. His surviving children were:

- Robert, died in England before 1608 without issue.
- Lucas of Uppercourt, M.P.1613-15, died 27 July 1622, aged 56 years. His eldest son and heir, Robert, hosted the first assembly of an independent Irish state at his Kilkenny home in October 1642 (see Confederate Ireland)
- Thomas of Freneystown, died without issue October 1636.
- John, died 13 November 1633, leaving a son, Richard, and a daughter, Anne.
- Marcus of Sheestown, ancestor of the Shees of Sheestown and Gardenmorris, Mayor of Kilkenny 1631.
- Lettice, wife of John Grace, of Courtstown.
- Katherine, wife of Edmund Cantwell, of Moycarky.
- Margate, wife of James Walsh, of Waterford.
- Isabel, wife of David, eldest son of Robert Rothe, of Kilkenny.

== Shee family tombs ==
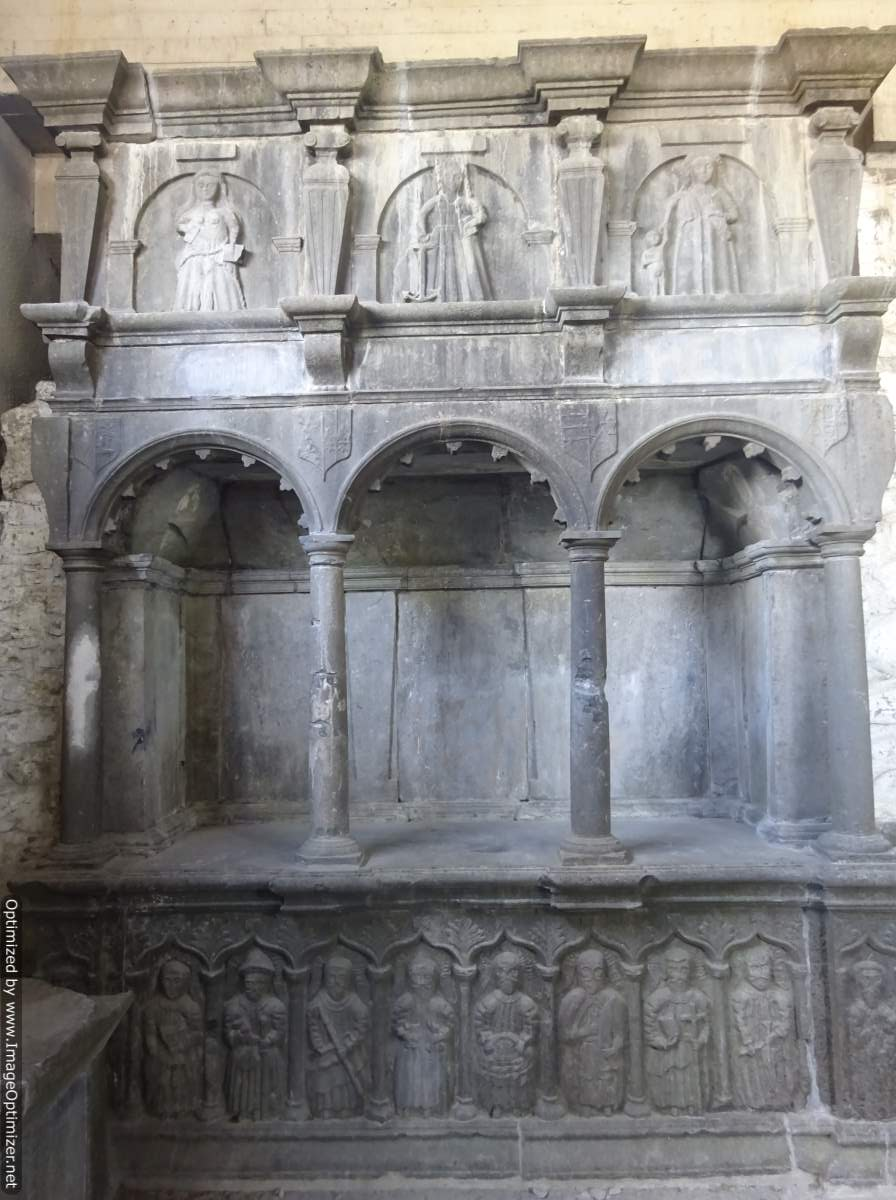
Richard Shee's tomb in St. Mary's Church, Kilkenny

The Shee family tombs projected the wealth and influence the family had in Kilkenny. Richard Shee was buried in Saint Mary's Church in Kilkenny City under an engraved monument. He stipulated in his will for his son and heir Lucas to build an appropriate tomb for a man of his standing in the community:

"I bequeath my soul to God, and my body to the buried in my said ffather’s burial in my parish church of our Ladye in Kilkennye. Executors of this my last will and testament doe make constitute and appoynte my sonnes Lucas Shee, Marcus Shee and John Shee; whom I doe appoynte to buylde a decent monument of the value of 100 marks sterling over my said burial”
