= Woodstock Estate =

Historic house in County Kilkenny, Ireland

Coordinates: 52.47592°N 7.059032°W

Woodstock House
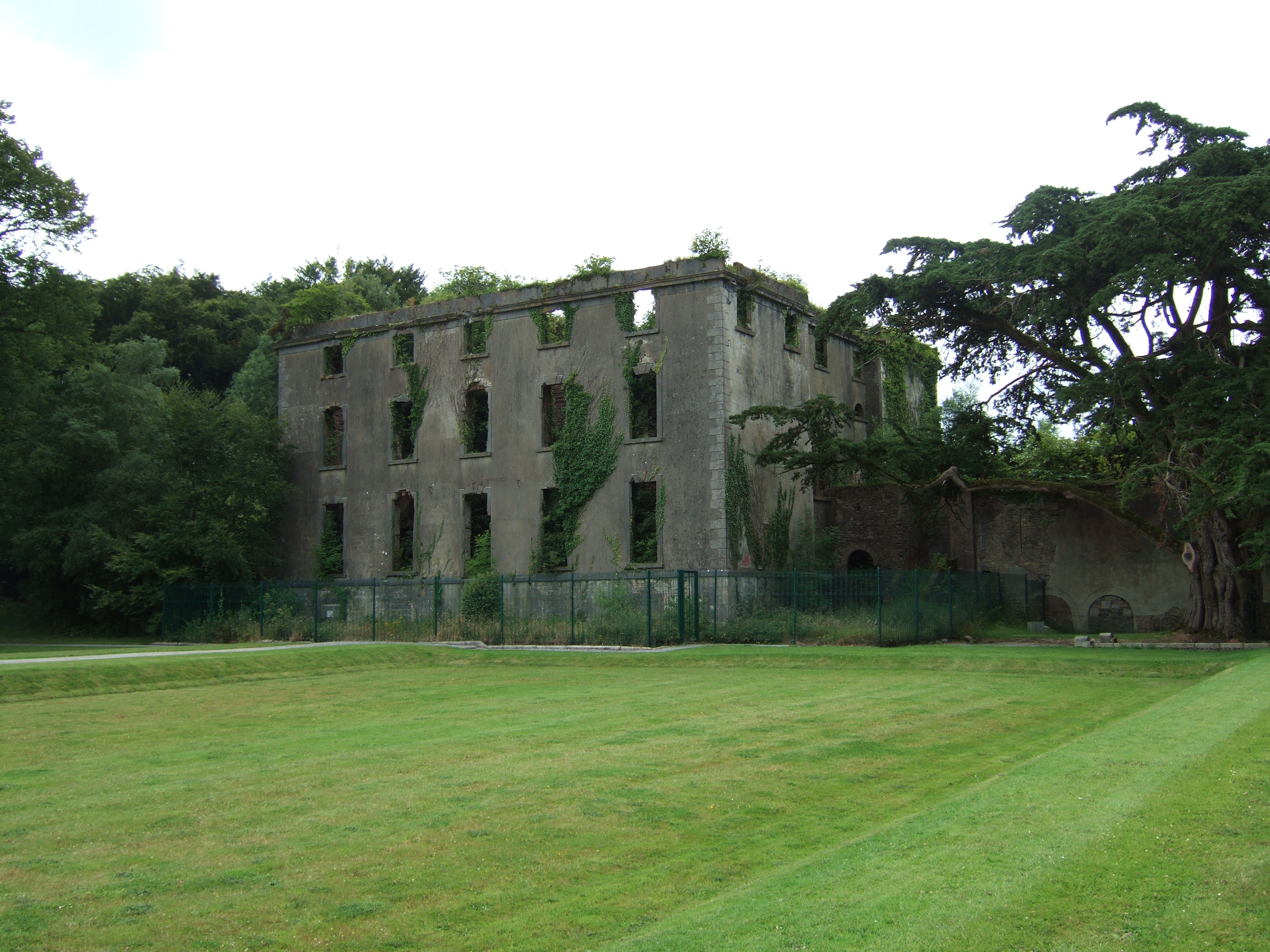
- The ruins of Woodstock House

General information
- Status: Ruin
- Type: House
- Architectural style: Palladian
- Location: Inistioge, County Kilkenny, Ireland
- Current tenants: Coillte; Kilkenny County Council
- Construction started: 1745
- Completed: 1747
- Owner: Tighe family

Technical details
- Material: Kilkenny limestone and sandstone
- Floor count: 4

Design and construction
- Architect: Francis Bindon
- Developer: Sir William Fownes, 2nd Baronet
- Other designers: Richard Turner (Glass conservatory - 1860)
- Main contractor: William Colles (1745)

Renovating team
- Architect: William Robertson (1804-06)

Woodstock House and Estate is a ruined Georgian house and estate located near Inistioge, County Kilkenny, Ireland, on the west bank of the River Nore. The Ladies of Llangollen story began here and Mary Tighe died here. The house was destroyed by presumed arson after it was used a billet by the British army during the Irish War of Independence.

The house is still a ruin but the gardens are open to the public.

== History ==
In 1737, William Fownes's grandfather left him over 21,000 acres. William Fownes father, (also) Sir William Fownes, had been the Mayor of Dublin. When the younger William married Elizabeth Ponsonby he received £4,000 as a dowry. With this money William and Elizabeth built the six bayed three storey Woodstock House in County Kilkenny in 1745-7.

They had a child guest named Sarah Ponsonby who was Elizabeth's cousin. When Sarah's adult friend, Lady Eleanor Butler, ran away from home she was hidden in Sarah's room and the housemaid Mary Carryl smuggled in food for her stowaway. Sarah was receiving unwanted attention from Sir William but eventually they agreed that they could leave Ireland together. They went to Llangollen in Wales where they set up home in a cottage called Plas Newydd. Eleanor and Sarah became the Ladies of Llangollen with Mary Carryl as their lifelong servant.

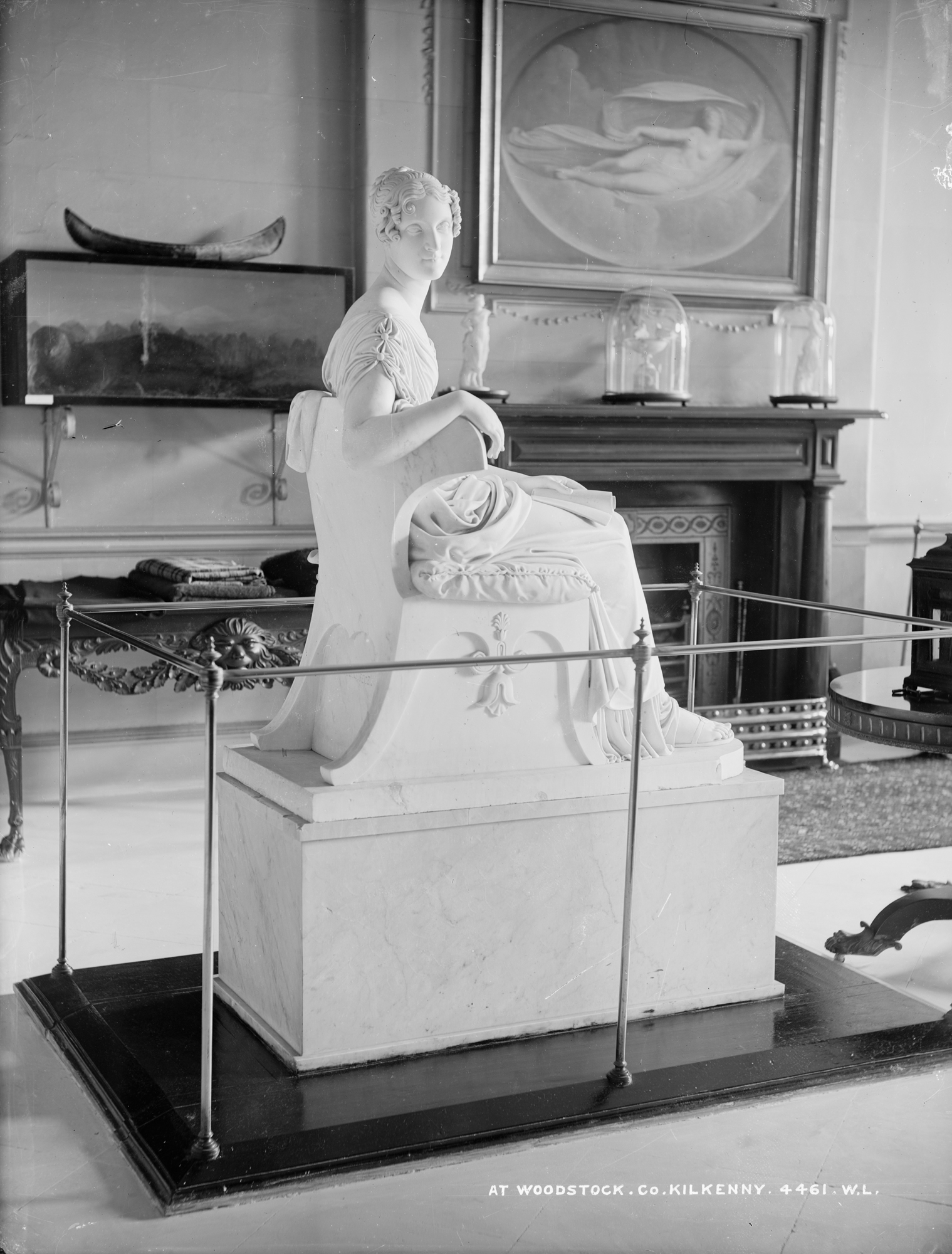
Mary Blachford Tighe (1772-1810) as sculpted by Lorenzo Bartolini ca. 1820.

Over the next forty-five years, Woodstock was the background to a series of dramas that led to the deaths of William, Elisabeth and their son-in-law William Tighe.

Between 1804-06, the existing wings, which were likely Palladian curved quadrant wings, were replaced by the local architect Daniel Robertson with flanking wings over a basement to create service yards for the then owner William Tighe.

The Irish poet Mary Tighe died here of tuberculosis in 1820.

The gardens and walks were laid out between 1840 and 1900 by another William Tighe and his wife Lady Louisa Lennox. The gardens contain many exotic plants from Asia and South America, including the Monkey Puzzle tree and the Noble Fir tree which form two of the walks in the gardens, as well as specimens of the Coast Redwood.

Between 1848-51, a New Model Agricultural School was developed on the land to the design of architect Frederick Darley for the Commissioners of Education.

=== 20th century ===
In 1921, the property was occupied by the Black and Tans and Auxiliaries, which caused resentment, and then by troops of the Free State Army, who were withdrawn from the premises during the Irish Civil War, on 1 July 1922. The house, left unguarded, was burnt down the next day, and remains a derelict empty shell, overgrown with vegetation. The grounds are being restored by Kilkenny County Council and are open to the public.

In the grounds, near the river, is a shooting lodge called the Red House.

In 1978 the estate hosted the Irish Jamboree, marking seventy years of Scouting in Ireland. The celebrations were attended by almost 10,000 Scouts from around the world and they were opened by President Patrick Hillery.
