= Margaret Tynan =

Irish politician

- Born: 15 November 1930; Kilkenny, Ireland
- Died: 28 October 2007 (aged 76); Kilkenny, Ireland
- Known for: First woman Mayor of Kilkenny city

Margaret Tynan (15 November 1930 – 28 October 2007) was the first woman Mayor of Kilkenny city. She was first elected in 1969 and was elected another seven times after that.

== Early life ==
Margaret Tynan was the daughter of Pierce Tynan, founder of the Kilkenny Motor Company. Tynan was educated at Presentation Convent and Mount Rath in Co Laois and began a degree in medicine at University College Dublin. She did not complete her degree as she returned home to run the family business and take care of her parents. She had three brothers who died relatively young, two in tragic circumstances. The eldest, Paddy, was killed testing a car, while her youngest brother Dominic, drowned in 1974. Her middle brother died from a heart attack. Tynan was a rally driver and occasionally beat Rosemary Smith. Her other sports included golf, camogie, table tennis and badminton.

== Political career ==
A member and then president of the Chamber of Commerce Tynan got involved in county council politics for Fine Gael when she was elected as their candidate in 1974.

Institutions she was involved in founding in Kilkenny were the Social Services, the Citizens' Information Centre and the Rape Crisis Centre, the Business and Professional Women's Association, the Kilkenny Soroptimists and the Civic Trust.
