= St. Mary's Church, Kilkenny =

Saint Mary's Church
- Mary's Hall
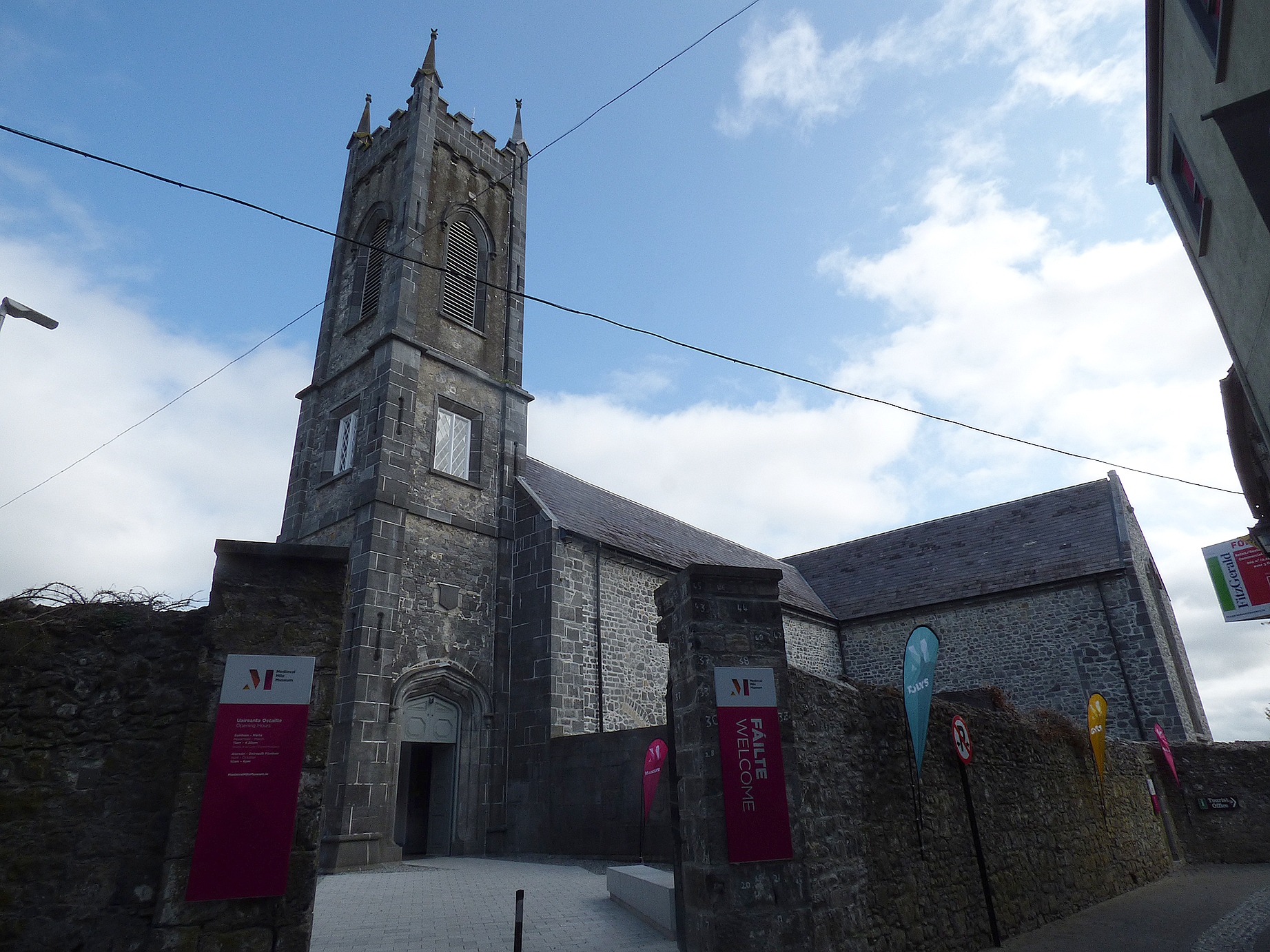
- The church in 2018
- Saint Mary's Church
- 52.65179°N 7.25221°W
- Location: St. Mary's Lane, Kilkenny City
- Country: Ireland
- Previous denomination: Church of Ireland, Roman Catholic

History
- Status: deconsecrated
- Founded: 1202
- Dedication: Mary

Architecture
- Functional status: Medieval Mile Museum
- Architect: William Robertson
- Architectural type: Chapel
- Style: Gothic, Gothic Revival

Specifications
- Materials: limestone

St. Mary's Church was a church in Kilkenny, Ireland, first built in 1202 at the time of the Norman settlement of the town. The church building was deconsecrated in 1957 and has been used as the Medieval Mile Museum since 2017.

== History ==
St. Mary's Church was built in 1202 close to Kilkenny Castle under the newly established Norman rule of Kilkenny. The tower was added in 1343. The parish was carved out of the parishes of St. Patrick's and St. Canice's. St. Mary's parish originally ended at St. James's Street, but was extended between 1207 and 1232 to extend beyond St. James's Street to the Breagagh River. The land for that extension was provided by the Bishop of Ossory in exchange for land in Aghaboe, County Laois. St. Mary's served as the church for the medieval (Norman) High Town, as Bishop David Rothe describes in the early 17th century.

As early as 1205, the building was used to hold ecclesiastical court.

Throughout the Middle Ages, the church's upkeep was financed by the town's (later city's) merchants by collection of 4d. annually from each hall and a halfpenny from each stall or shop in town. Thus, the church became the pride of the merchant class in Kilkenny and many of its prominent members are buried there, including the Shee family, Archer family, Rothe family from Rothe House and bishop David Rothe. Only the wealthiest of the burgesses were allowed to be buried within the church.

The town council held meetings in the building as well as court sessions. In the 16th century, it was also used as a venue for town plays.

After the Reformation, the building fell into disrepair. It became a Protestant church like St. Canice's Cathedral and St. John's Priory, even though the Protestant population in Kilkenny was declining from under 20% in 1731 to 5% by 1800. This resulted in the building of Catholic churches of the same names (St. Canice's Church, St. John's Church and St. Mary's Cathedral) in later years.

In 1603, with James I on the throne, the church was converted back to serve the Catholic population, only to be later converted again to be used by the Church of Ireland congregation. At the time of the Confederation of Kilkenny (1642-1649), it was again in Catholic hands with Archbishop Rinuccini celebrating High Mass. In 1957, it was finally deconsecrated and restored for use as a parish and badminton hall as well as a lodge for the Free Masons.

In 2009, the property was bought by Kilkenny County Council.

== Architecture ==
In its original shape, the church had a nave with side aisles, transepts and a chancel. Around 1560, the Rothe family (wealthy merchants) built a chantry chapel in the north transept of the church dedicated to the Archangel Michael. Even after the reformation had seen the church turned over to Protestant worship, these chapels continued to be used by the Catholic congregation. The family of John Rothe and Rose Archer from Rothe House are buried there, amongst other Catholic merchants of the time and later.

It is believed that the bell-tower was a separate building, today indicated by a concrete platform in the churchyard.

Kilkenny born architect William Robertson carried out works on the tower and elsewhere between 1819 and 1826. He is buried in the graveyard alongside his family. There is also a memorial plaque for his nephew in the church who was a founding member of the Kilkenny Archaeological Society.

== Archaeology ==
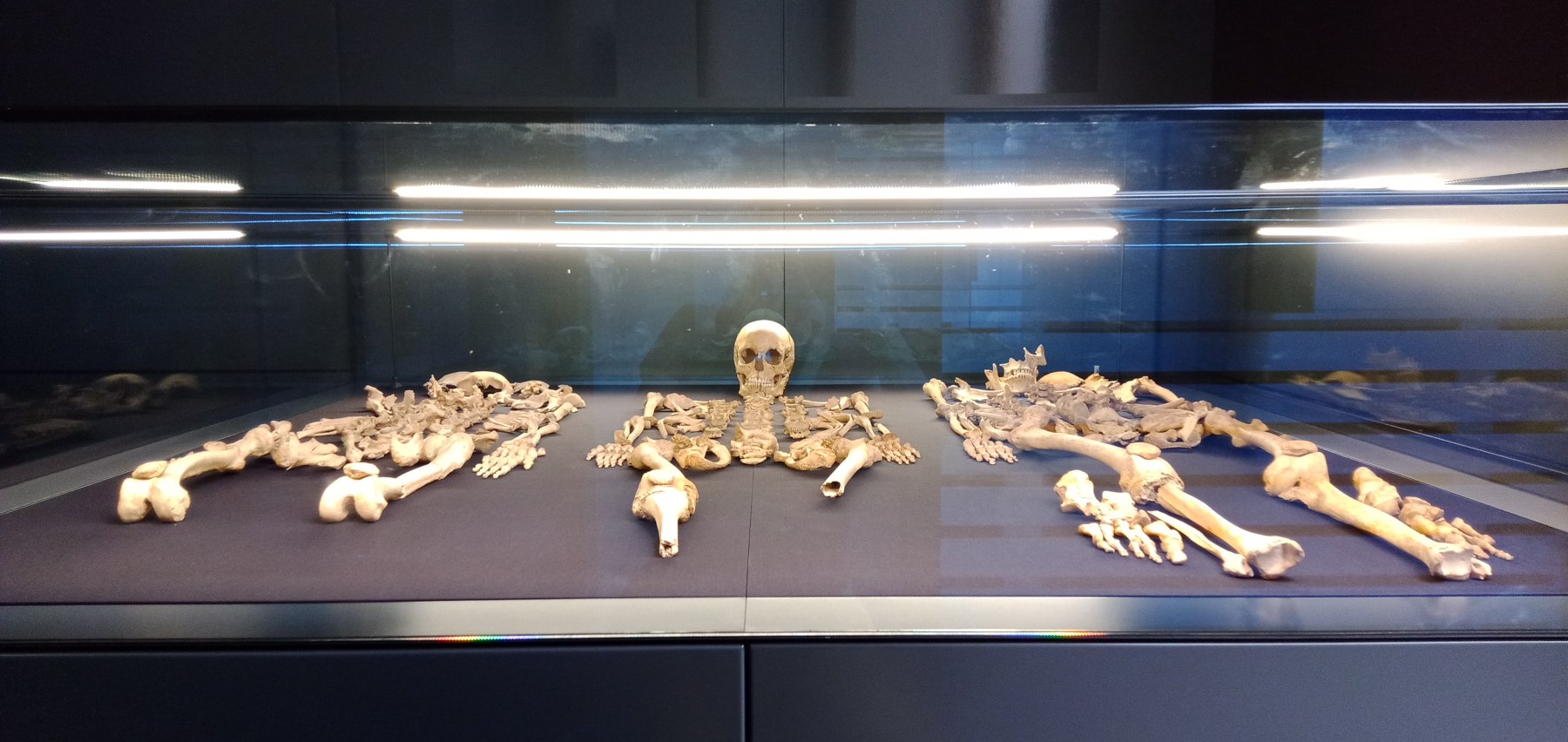
Three partial female skeletons on display

In preparation of the opening of the building as a museum, four female skeletons were discovered in 2016 in the gateway area. The work was carried out by Kilkenny Archaeology. Three of the bodies found are on display in the museum since 2019.

== Ordnance Survey ==
With its tall spire making it a prominent landmark, St. Mary's Church served as the fundamental reference point for Kilkenny, when the city and county were surveyed by the Ordnance Survey. A benchmark at the entrance still bears witness to that.

== Gallery ==
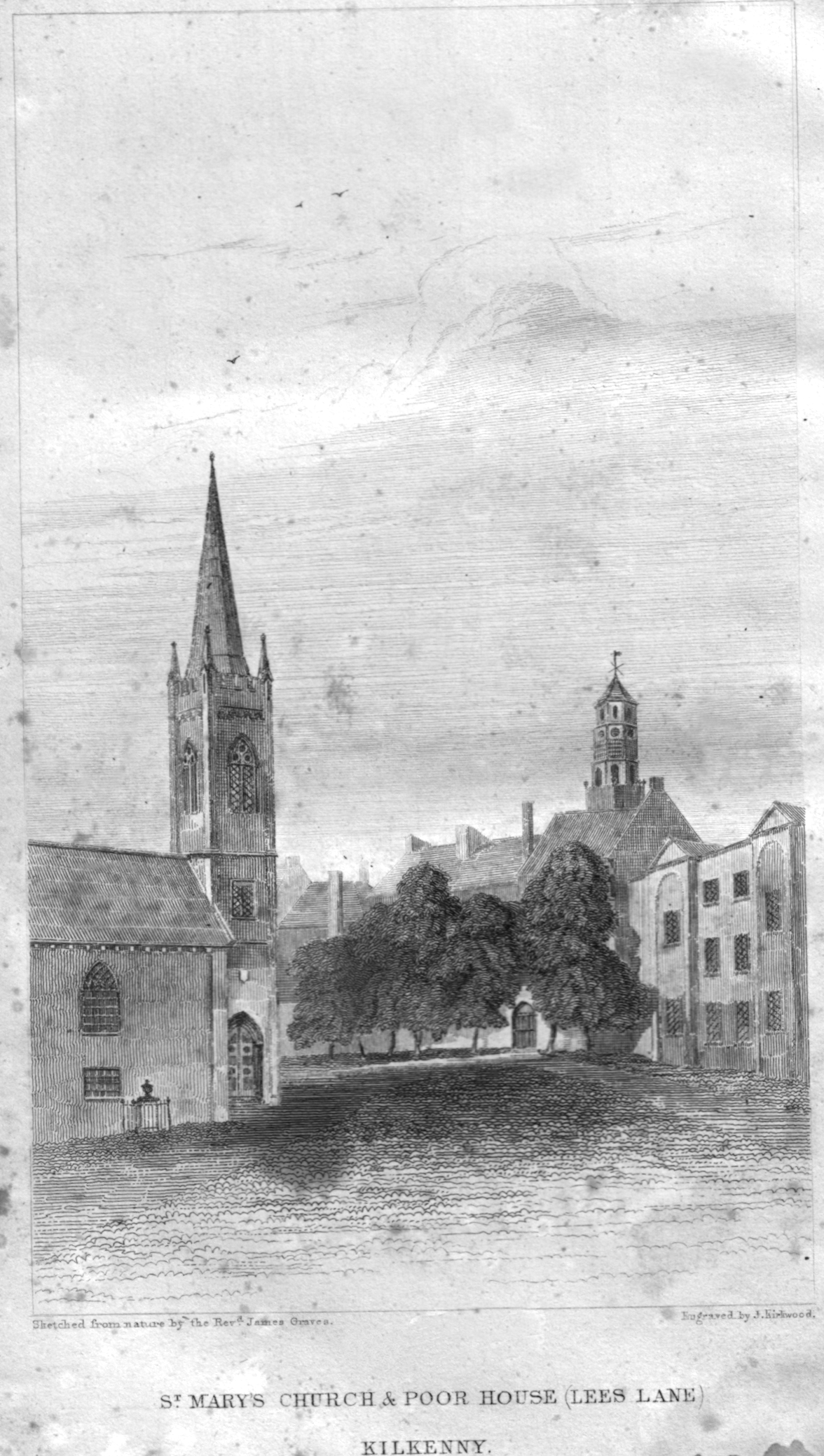
Drawing of the church by James Graves showing the since lost spire

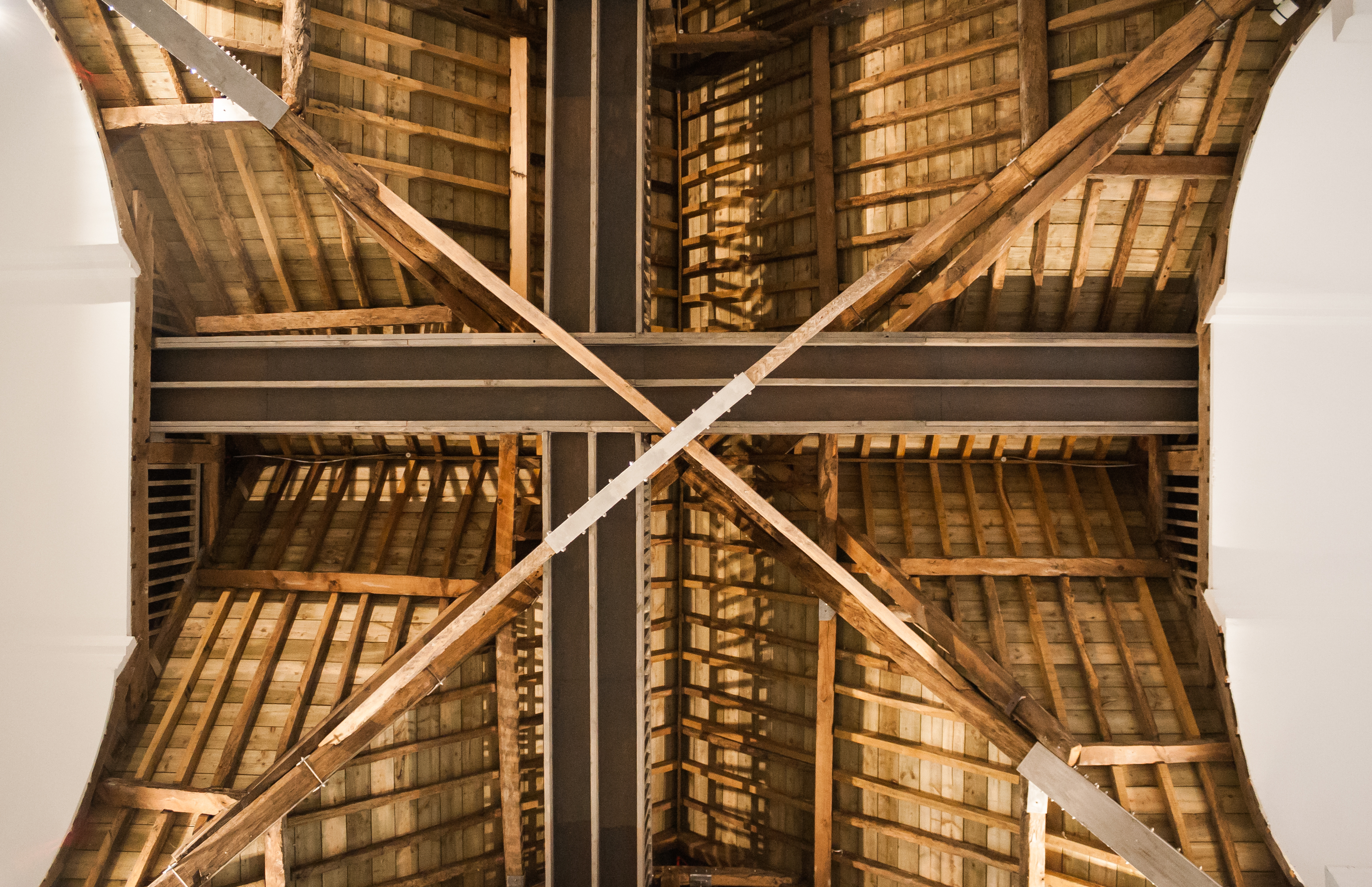
Ceiling in the restored church building

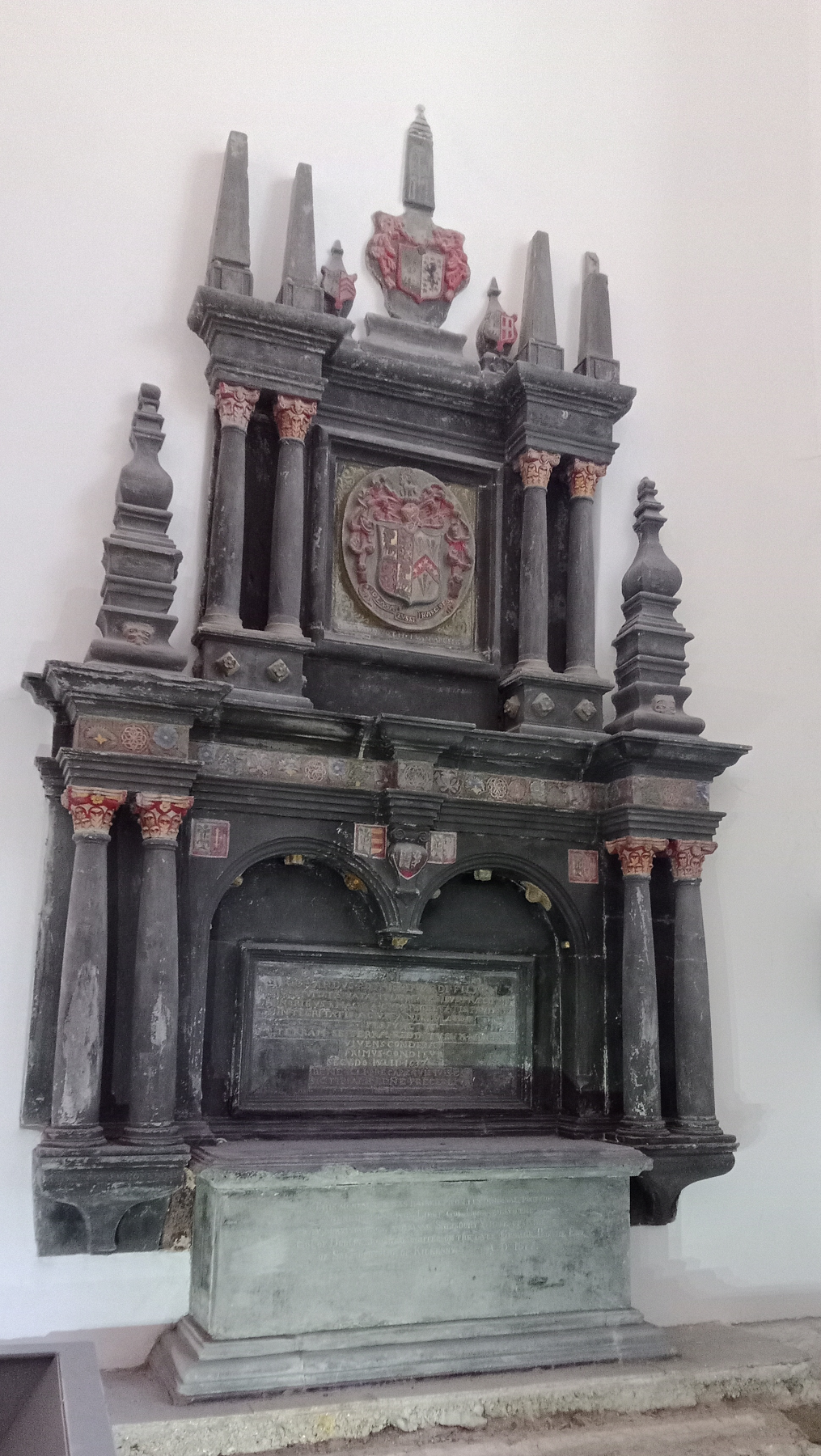
Rothe family tomb in St Michael's Chapel
