= William Robertson (Irish architect) =

Irish architect (born 1770)

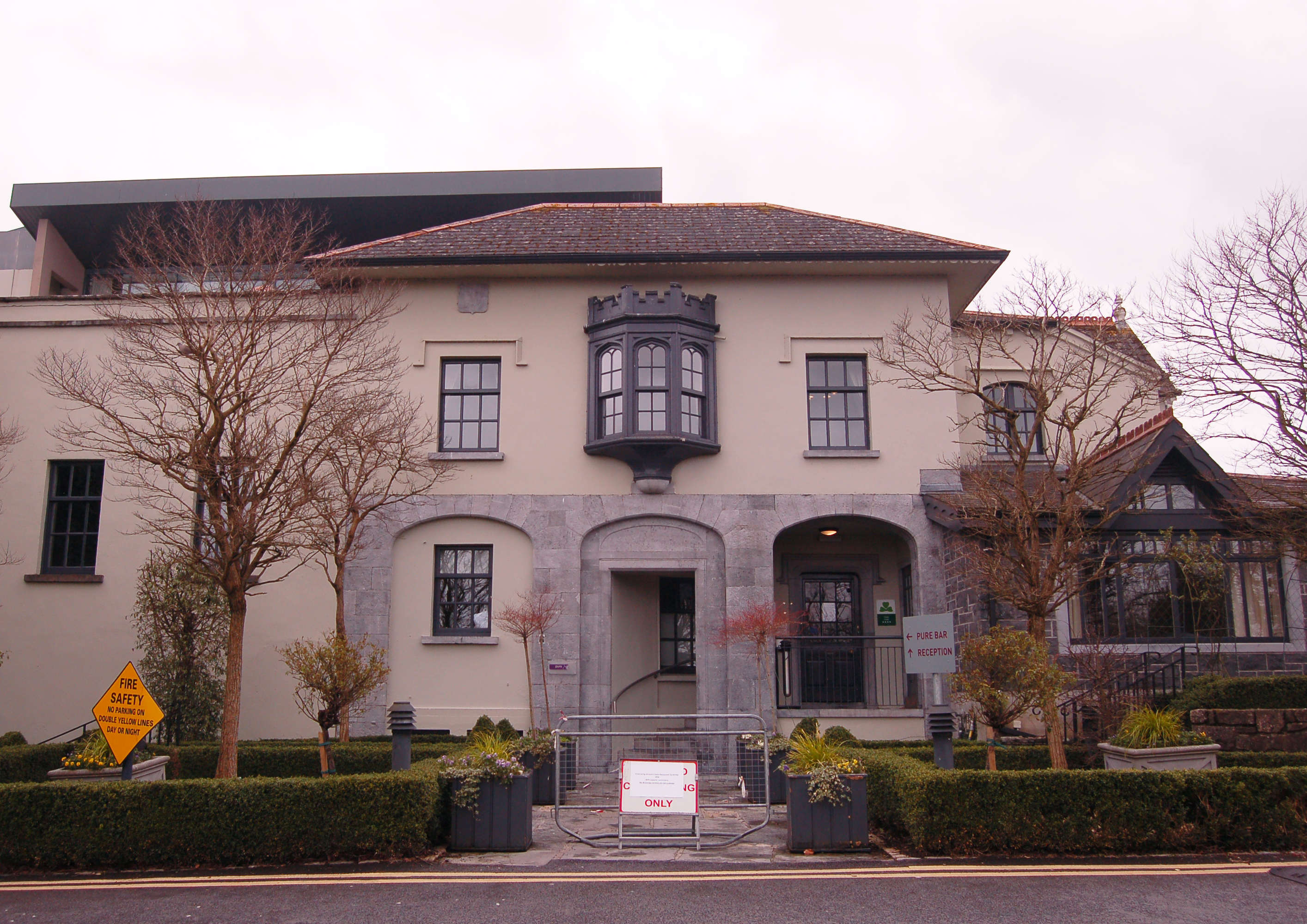
- Rosehill House, where he resided until his death
- Born: 1770; Kilkenny
- Died: 1850 (aged 79–80); Kilkenny
- Other name: William Robinson
- Education: Royal Dublin Society
- Occupation: Architect
- Spouse: Catherine Jones
- Parent(s): William Robertson & Margery Jones
- Awards: silver medal for drawing (1795)
- Buildings: St. Canice's Church, Waterford Courthouse, Kilkenny Jail
- Projects: Kilkenny Castle (remodelled), St. Canice's Cathedral

William Robertson, an Irish architect, was born in Kilkenny, Ireland, some days before 4 December 1770. He attended the Dublin Society where he was awarded with a silver medal for his drawing skills in 1795.

After some years in London, he returned to Kilkenny, where he designed the Gaol, St. Canice's Church and the Psychiatric Hospital ("Lunatic Asylum"). He also remodelled Kilkenny Castle and worked on his baptismal church St. Mary's and St. John's Priory. Furthermore, he worked on other buildings in his home county as well as buildings in County Cork, County Tipperary, County Laois and County Waterford. William Robertson's work has been confused in the past with that of Daniel Robertson, so that some work attributed to Daniel has been re-attributed to William by now.

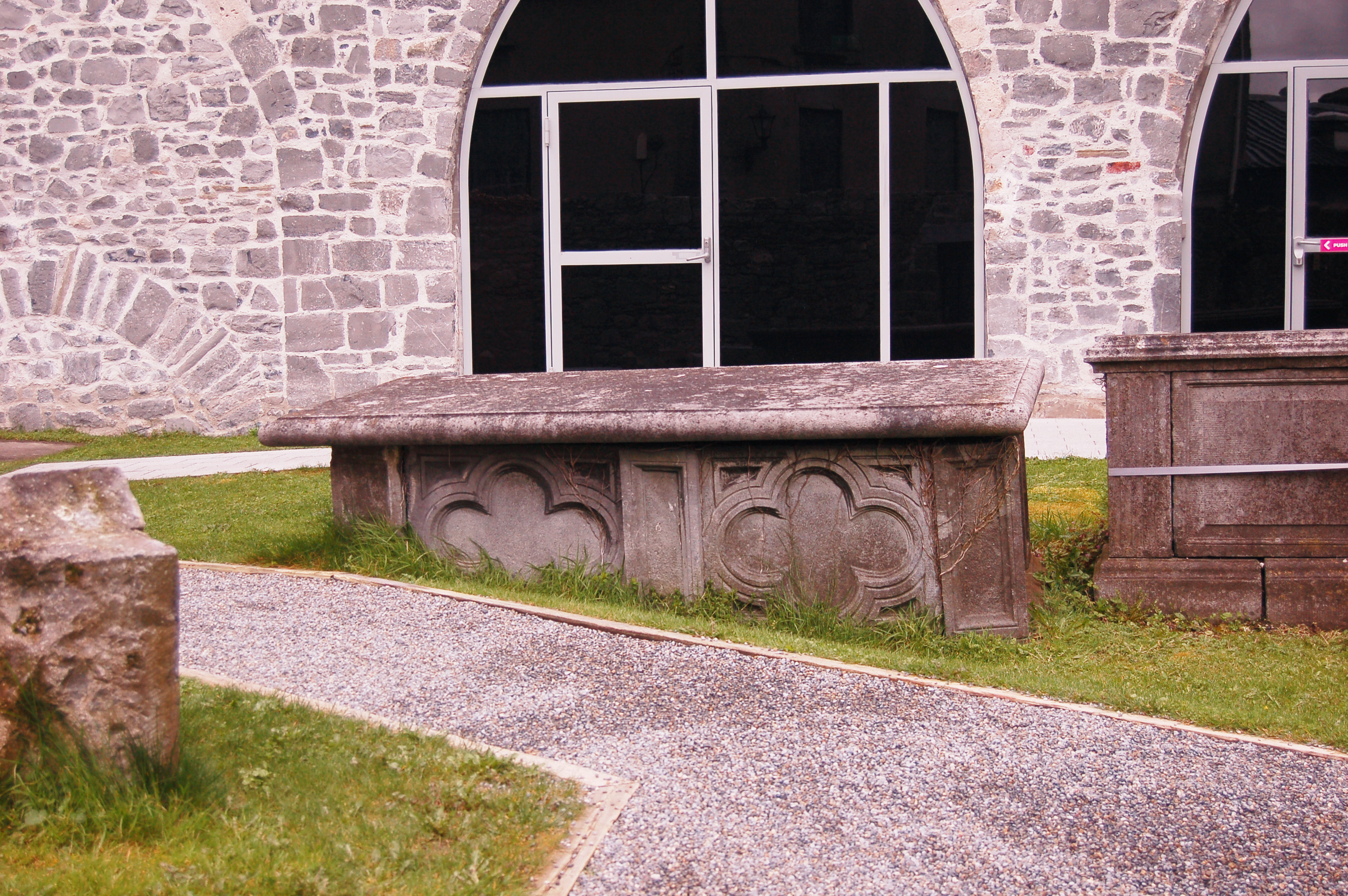
William Robertson's grave in St. Mary's Graveyard

He died on 23 May 1850 at his home in Rosehill, Kilkenny which he had also designed himself and is buried in St. Mary's Graveyard alongside his family.

== Early life ==
It is presumed that his father was William Robertson, a Scotsman who had come to Kilkenny from Aberdeenshire and had opened a nursery shop in High Street in 1765. His mother was Margery Jones from Clonmel. His older brother John (1767–1839) followed the father into the business. There is some confusion about his last name, his name appearing in the baptismal register of St. Mary's Church as "Robison" as well as his enrollment at the Dublin Drawing School as "William Robinson".

== The London Years ==
In London, young William Robertson presumably worked for a London-based architect. His notebook shows great interest in architecture and gardening. While in London, he exhibited sketches, amongst them one of Kilkenny Castle. While in London, he published two books that show the influence of his father's profession:

- A collection of various forms of stoves: used for forcing pine plants, fruit trees, and preserving tender exotics: intended as well for the use of amateurs, as that of students in the art of gardening. R. Ackermann, London, 1798. link to digital book on archive.org
- Designs in architecture: for garden chairs, small gates for villas, park entrances, aviarys, temples, boat houses, mausoleums, and bridges; with their plans, elevations, and sections, accompanied with scenery, etc. R. Ackermann, London and J.R. Beygang, Leipzig, 1800. link to digital book on archive.org

His books were translated into French and German:

- Desseins d'architecture : répresentans des siéges de jardins, des portes de maisons de campagne, des entrées de parcs, des volières, des temples, des hangars pourdes bateaux, des mausolées et des ponts; avec leurs plans, leurs élévations, leurs sections et des ornements. De l'imprimerie d'A. Dulau et Co. et de L. Nardini, Londres et Paris.
- Sammlung verschiedener Arten Gewächs- und Treibhäuser, um Ananasse und Fruchtbäume zu ziehen, und zarte ausländische Pflanzen zu erhalten. Zum Gebrauch für Liebhaber der Botanik und Gärtnerei. Nach dem Englischen bearbeitet von Joh[ann] Gottfr[ied] Grohmann, Prof. zu Leipzig. Mit XXIIII. Kupf. in getuschter Manier. Nebst ausführlichen Beschreibungen der Risse, und einer genauen Methode zur Erleichterung der Zeichnung im Grossen von Aufrissen und Durchschnitten, nach gegebenen Grundrissen. 18 S. in gr. Querfol. in blauem Umschl., Baumgärtnerische Buchhandlung Leipzig, 1800. Access online

== Family life ==
William Robertson married his first cousin Catherine Jones (1785–1872) from Clonmel in 1805. They had no children.

== Political life ==
He was liberal in his political views and supported Catholic Emancipation. He served Kilkenny as justice of peace, magistrate, alderman and was mayor of Kilkenny in 1831.

== Impact in Ireland ==
By 1801, Robertson had returned to Kilkenny. His first commission was the design of Kilkenny Gaol. He designed and worked on private houses for himself and others (Jenkinstown House, Woodstock Estate) and was also involved in designing and working on public works like the Courthouse in Kilkenny (Grace's Old Castle), the entrance gate to St. Kieran's College (originally at Jenkinstown House), several churches and the workhouses in Kilkenny and Carlow.

== Architectural style ==
In Kilkenny, William Robertson used the local stone Kilkenny Marble. He followed a Neo-Gothic style with the country houses and public buildings, very likely influenced by his childhood in Kilkenny. His own town-houses in Kilkenny are more influenced by the Georgian style. Some elements like hood moulds are practical as well as ornamental, whereas his stone plaques are merely decorational. In Kilkenny Castle and Rosehill House, he used oriel windows which might have been influenced by the one on Rothe House. His quatrefoils can be found in his sacral architecture as well as secular buildings built and remodelled by him (see photographs of St. Mary's Church, St. Canice's Cathedral and Kilkenny Castle).

== Gallery ==
Some examples of William Robertson's works include

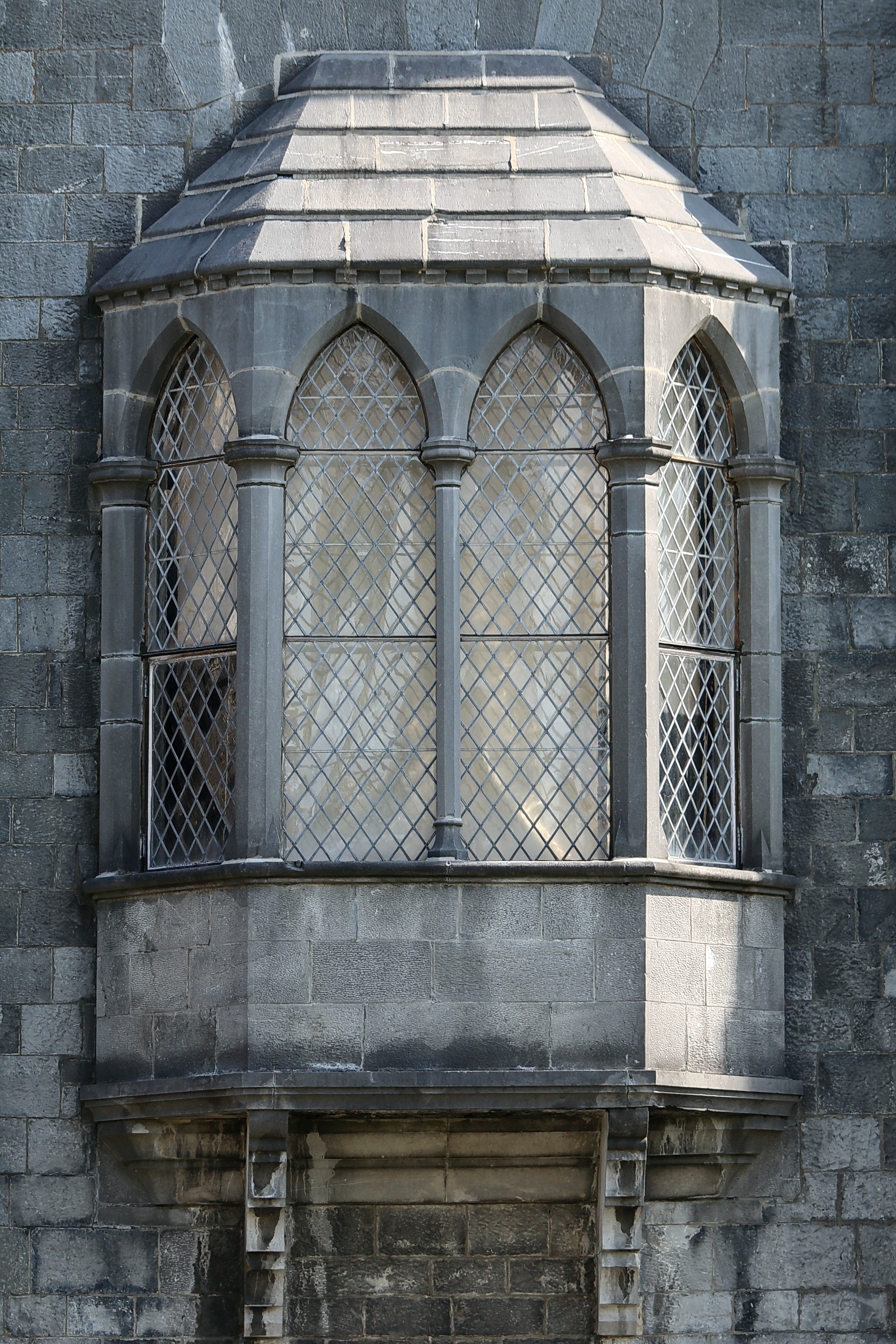
Oriel Window in Kilkenny Castle

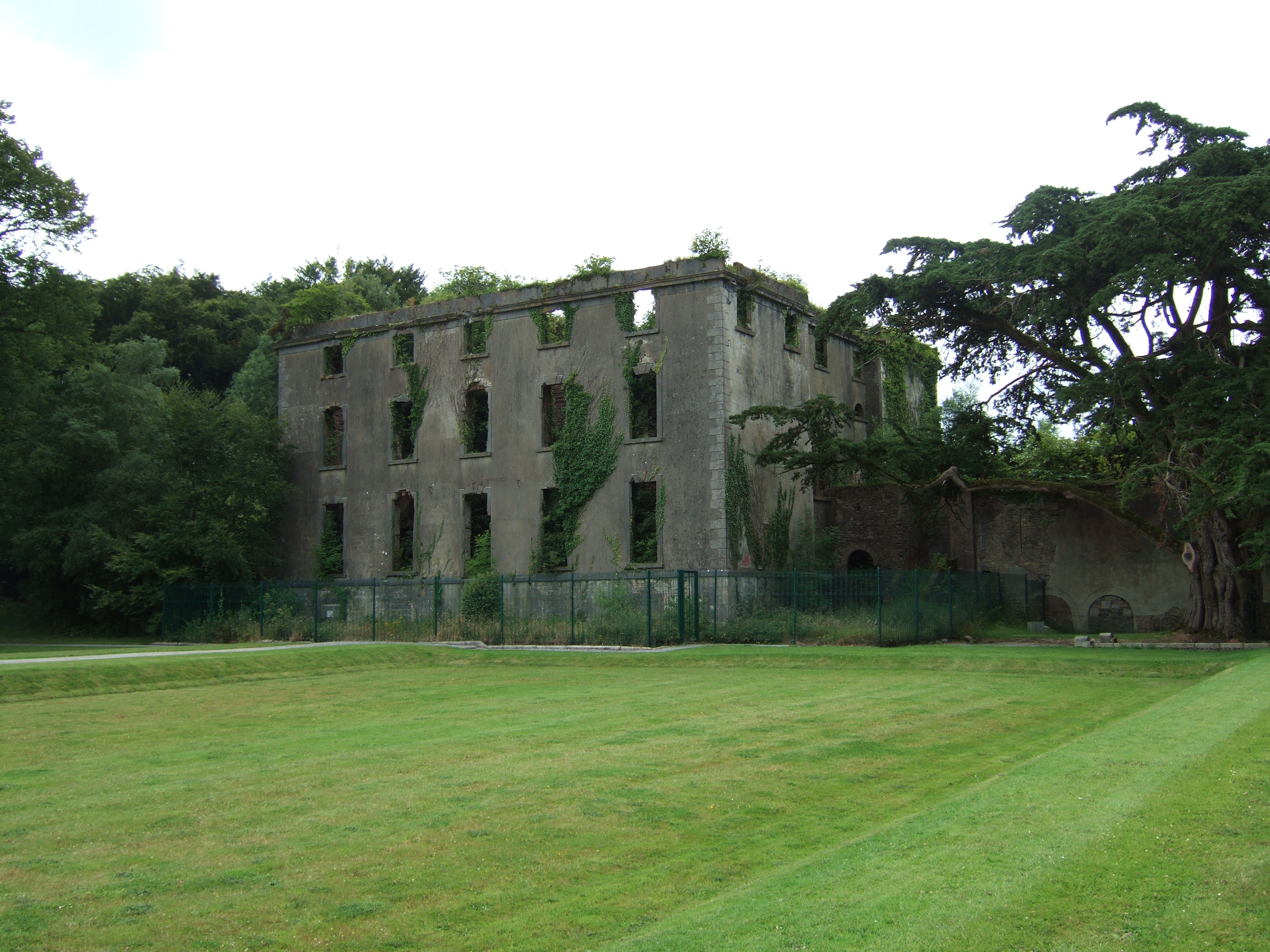
Remains of Woodstock Estate

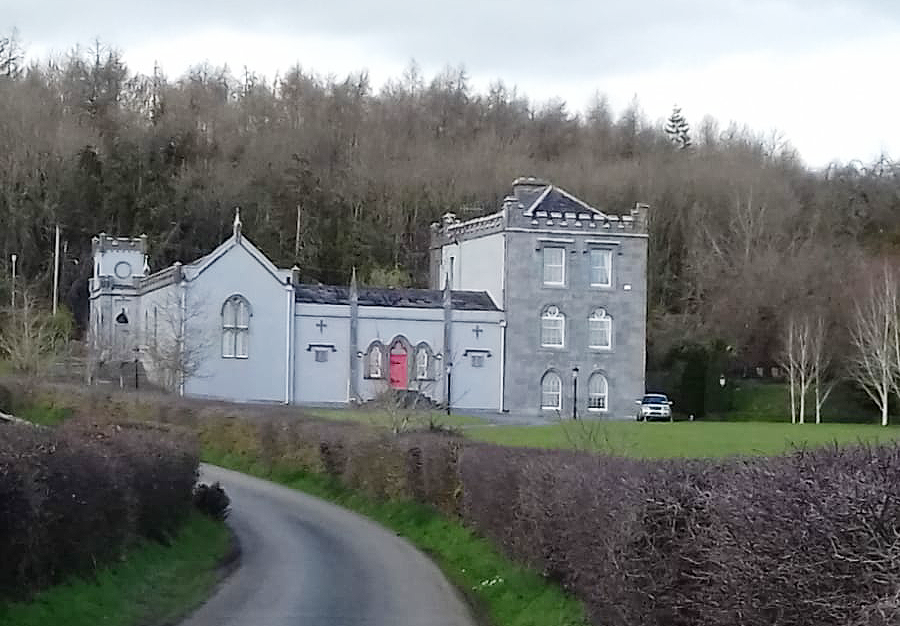
Jenkinstown House, County Kilkenny

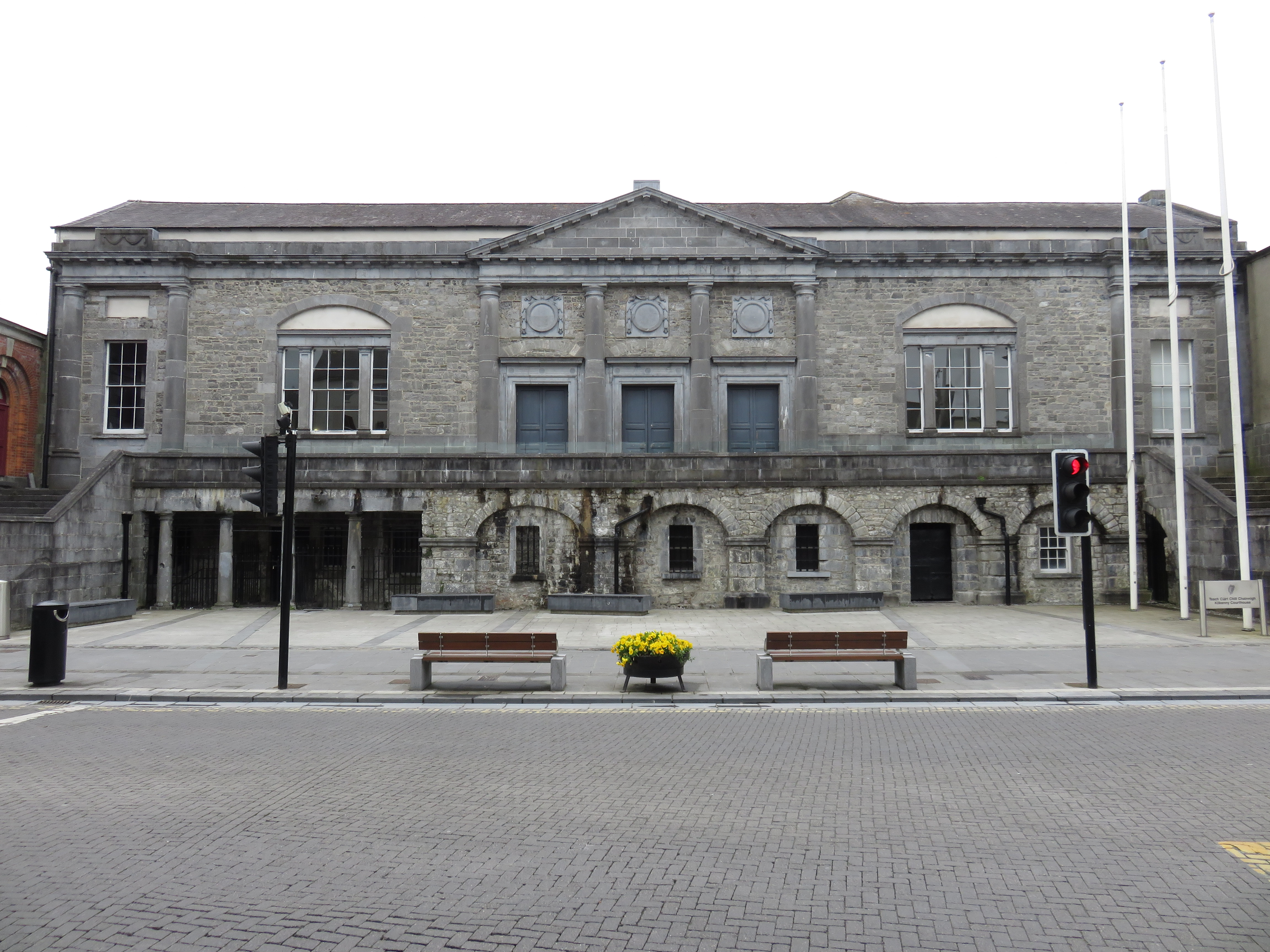
Kilkenny Courthouse

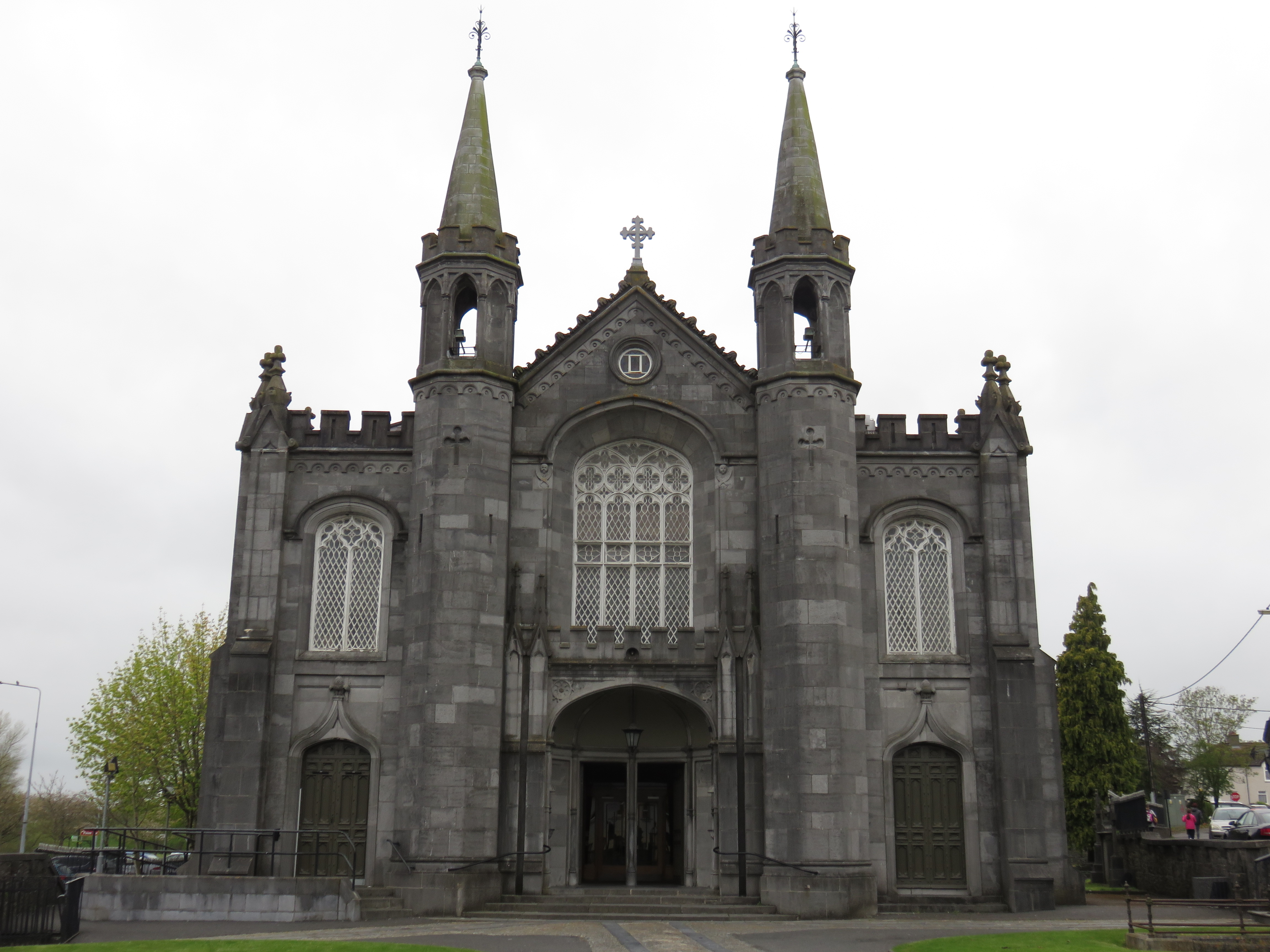
St. Canice's Church

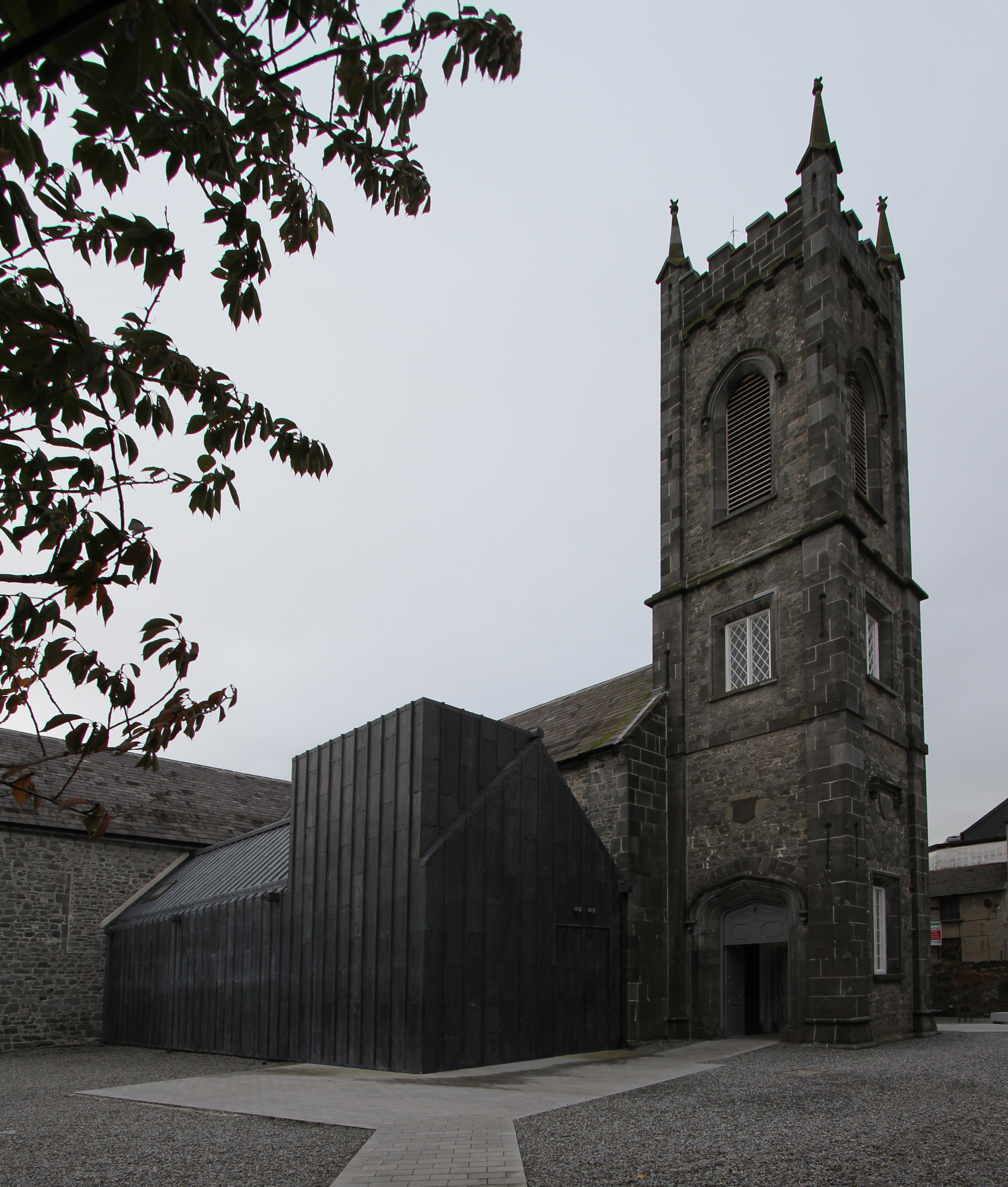
St. Mary's Church (Kilkenny)

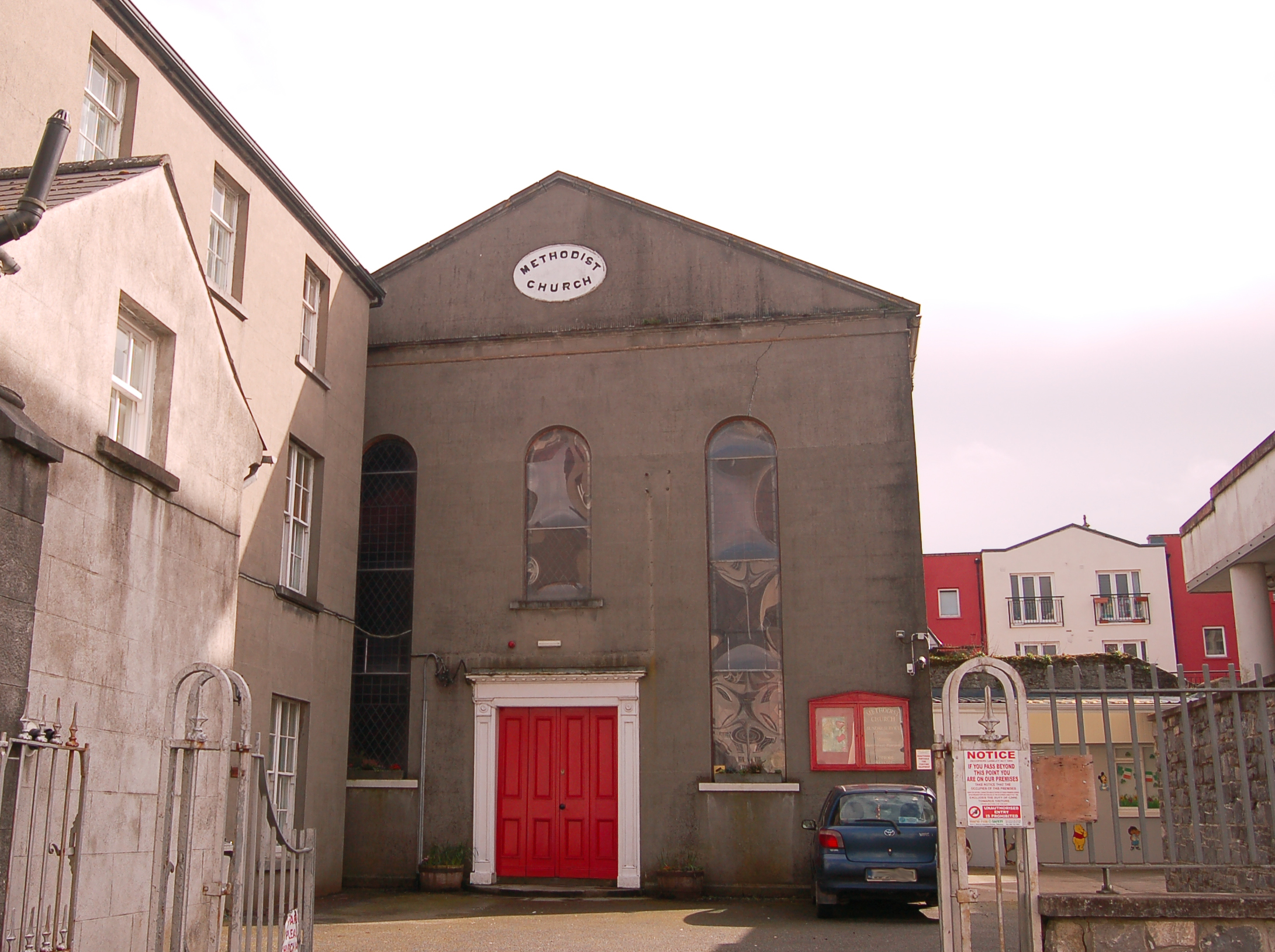
Methodist Church in William Street

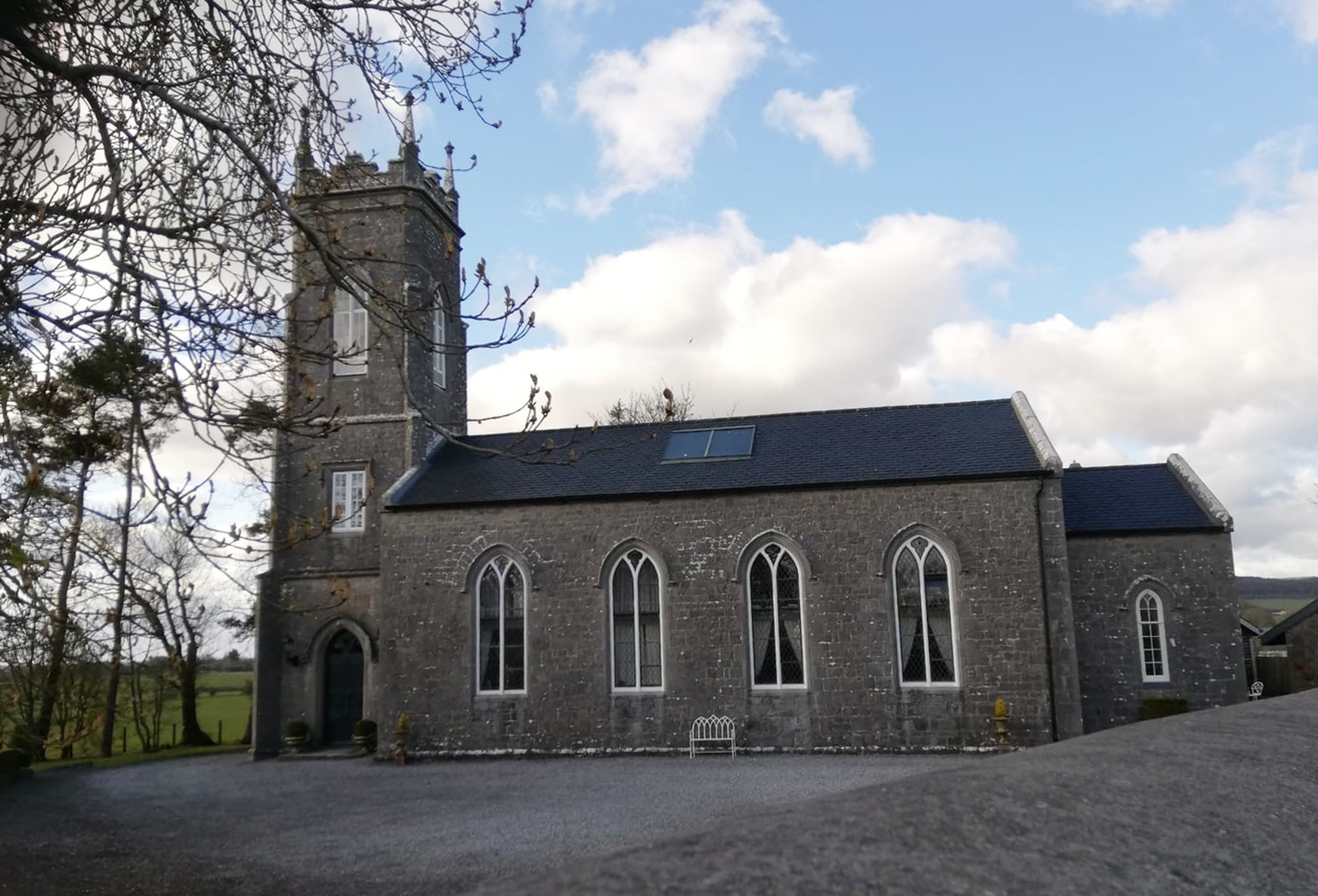
Former Church of Ireland in Woodsgift

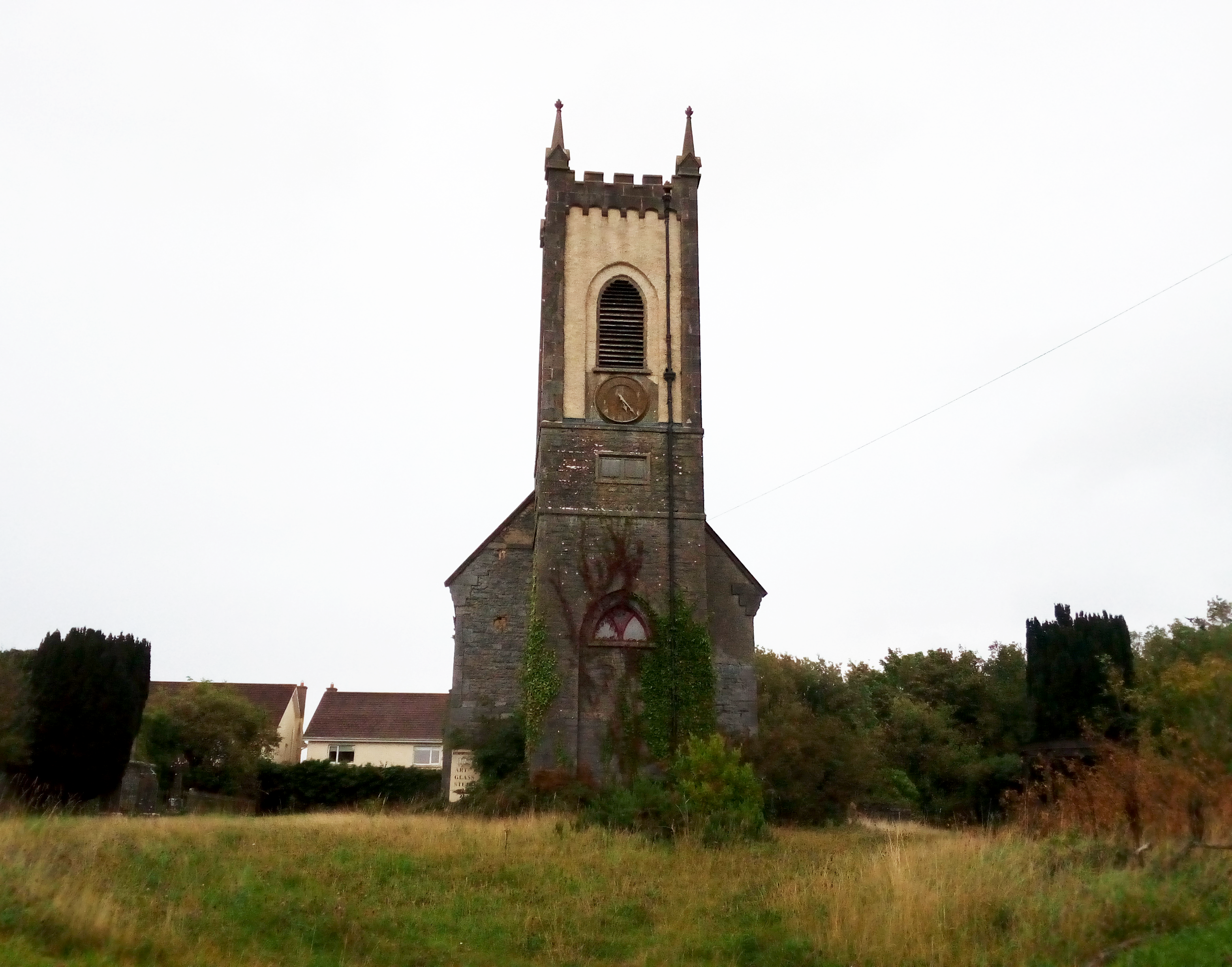
Former Church of Ireland in Knocktopher

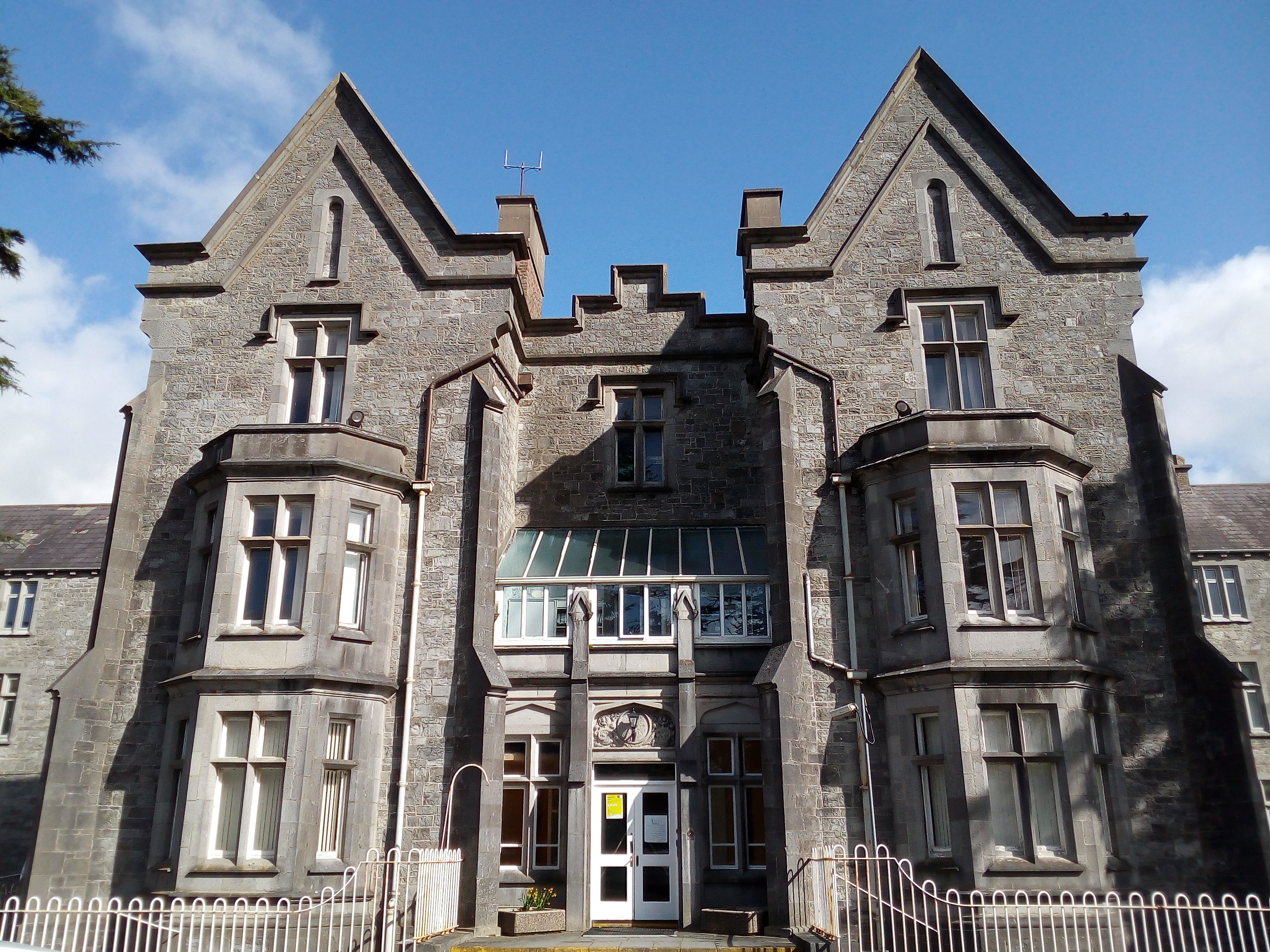
Kilkenny Lunatic Asylum

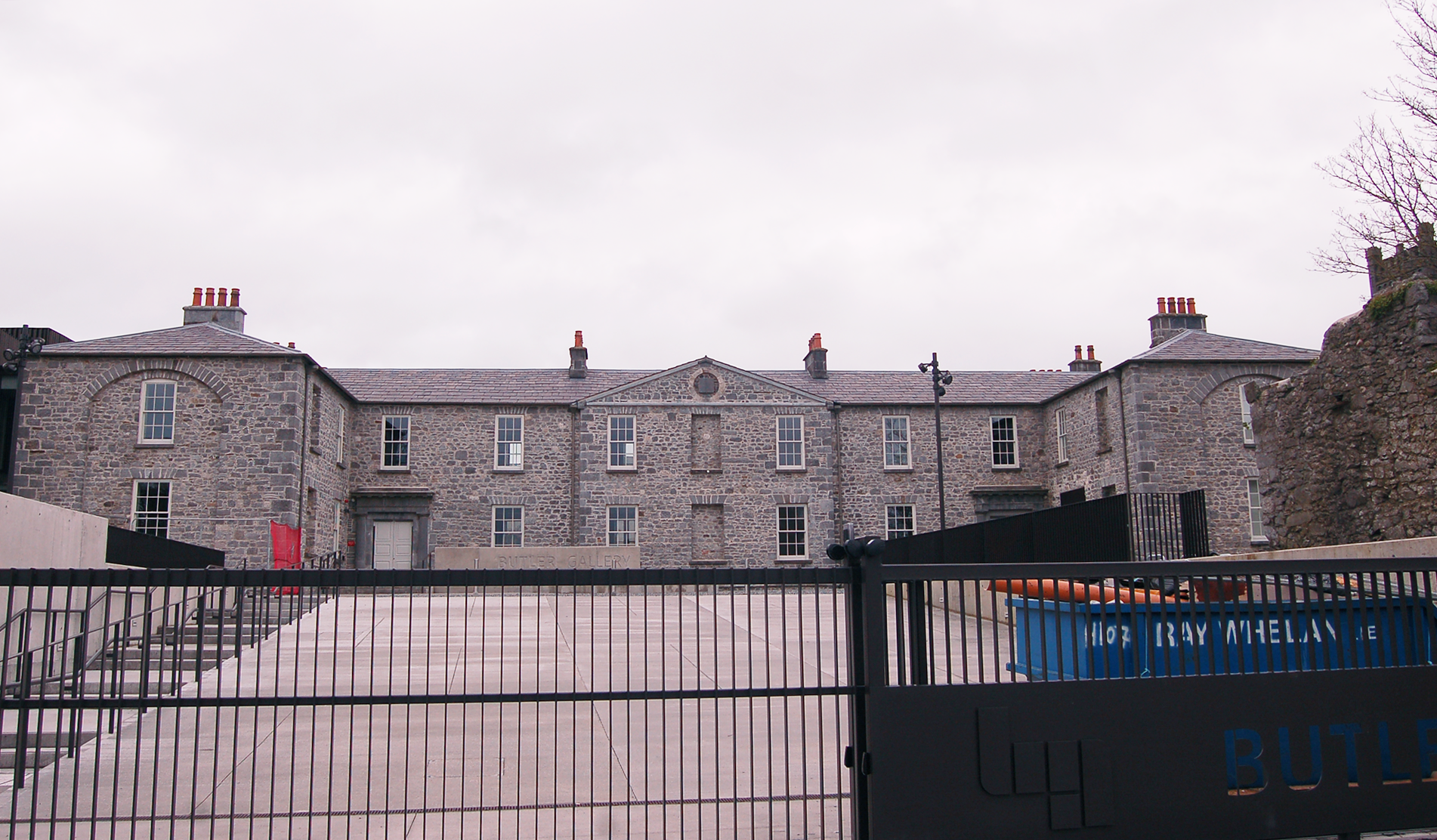
New Butler Gallery

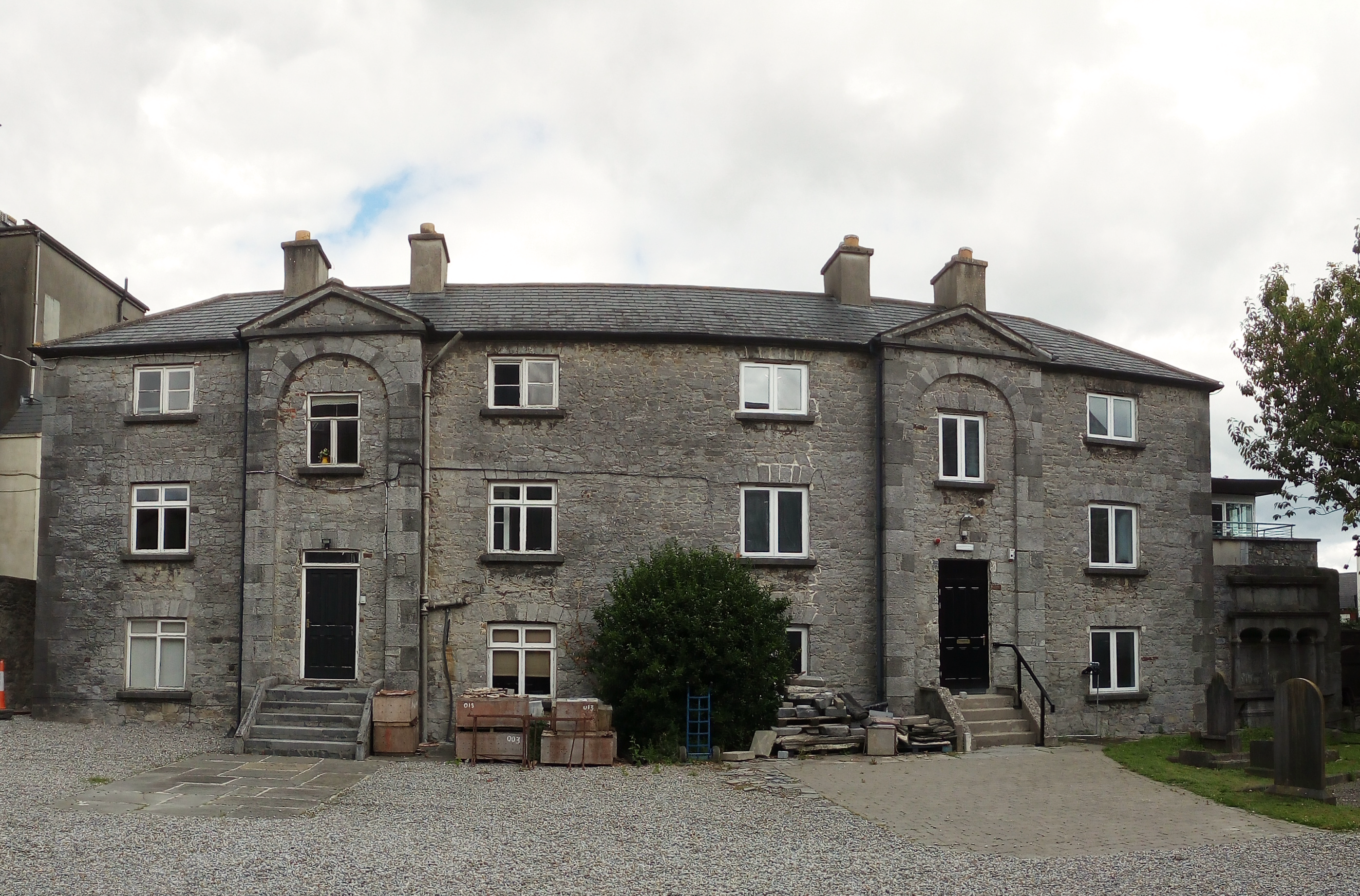
Lee's Lane Asylum in St. Mary's Churchyard (Kilkenny)

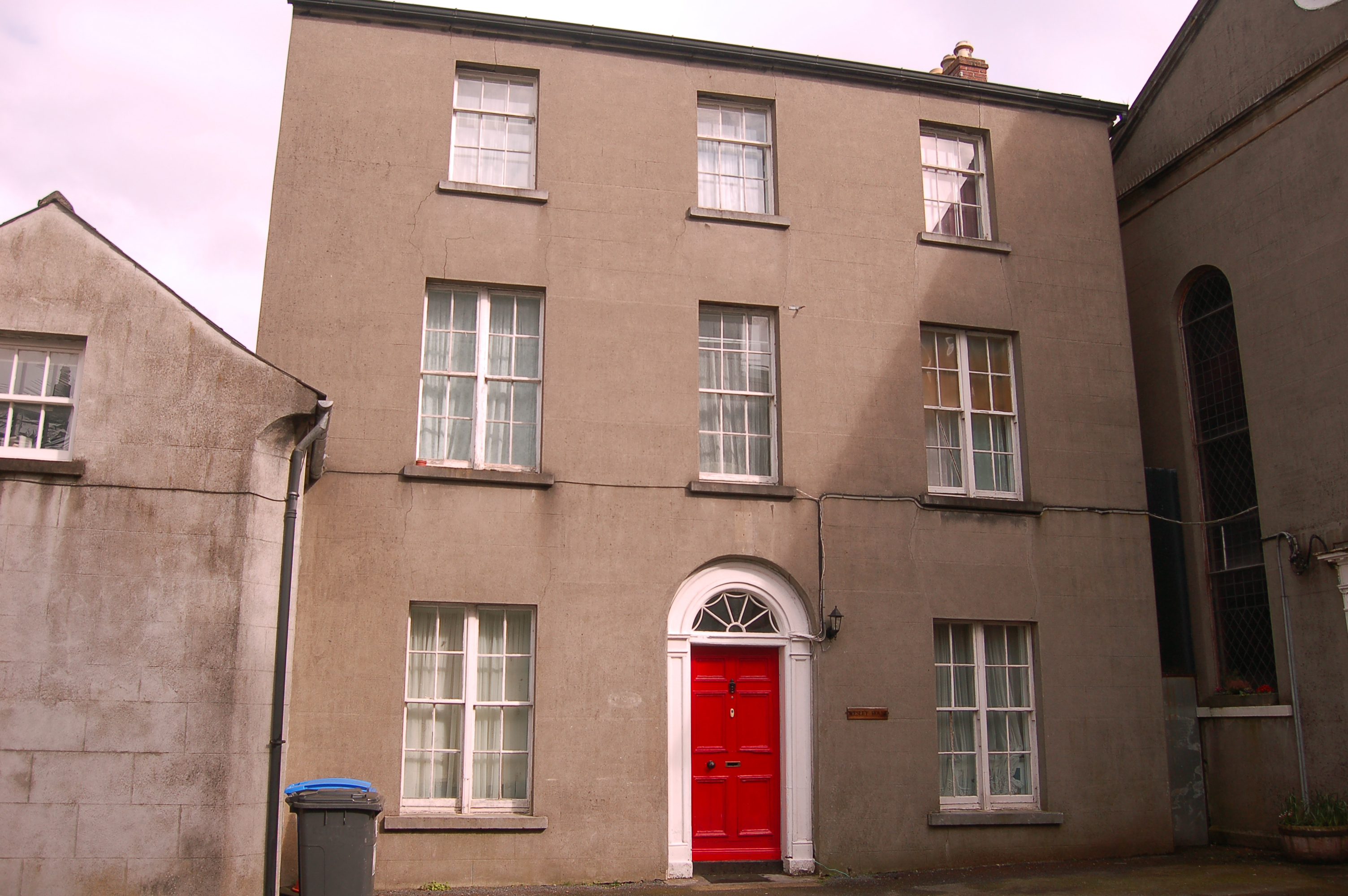
Manse to the Methodist Church

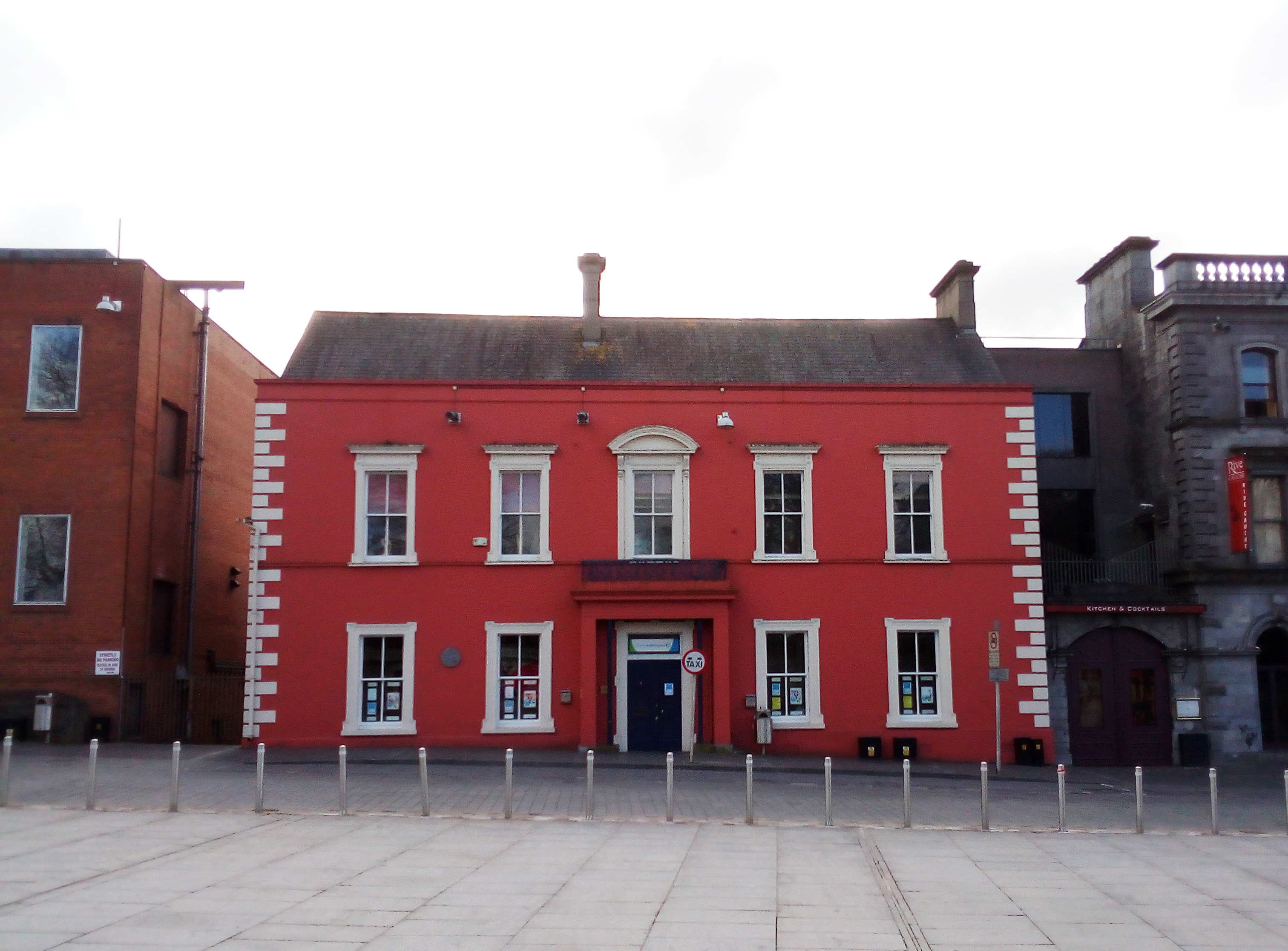
Building of the Athenaeum on the Parade in Kilkenny, a floorplan is kept in Rothe House

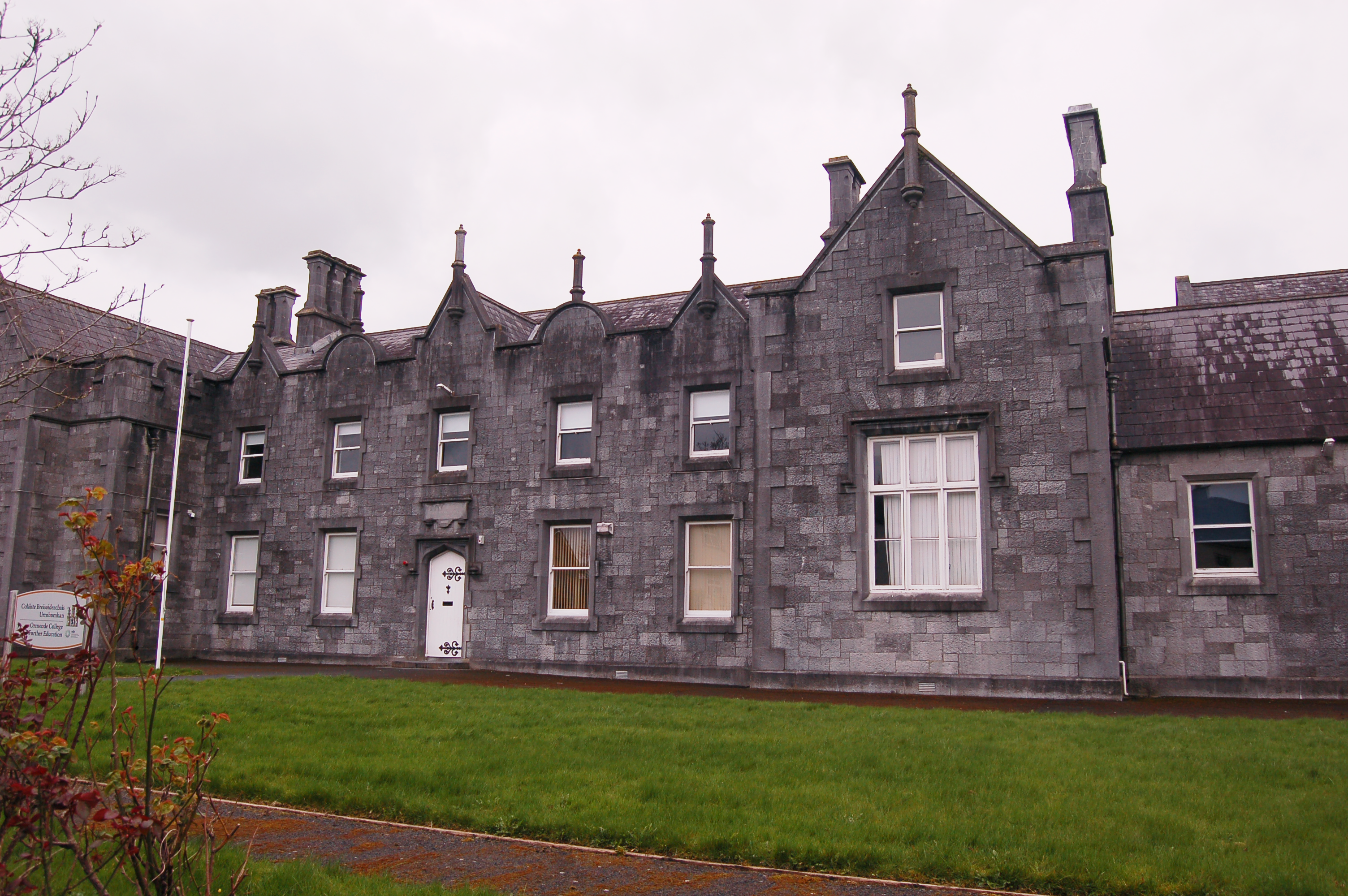
Partial view of Ormonde College in Kilkenny

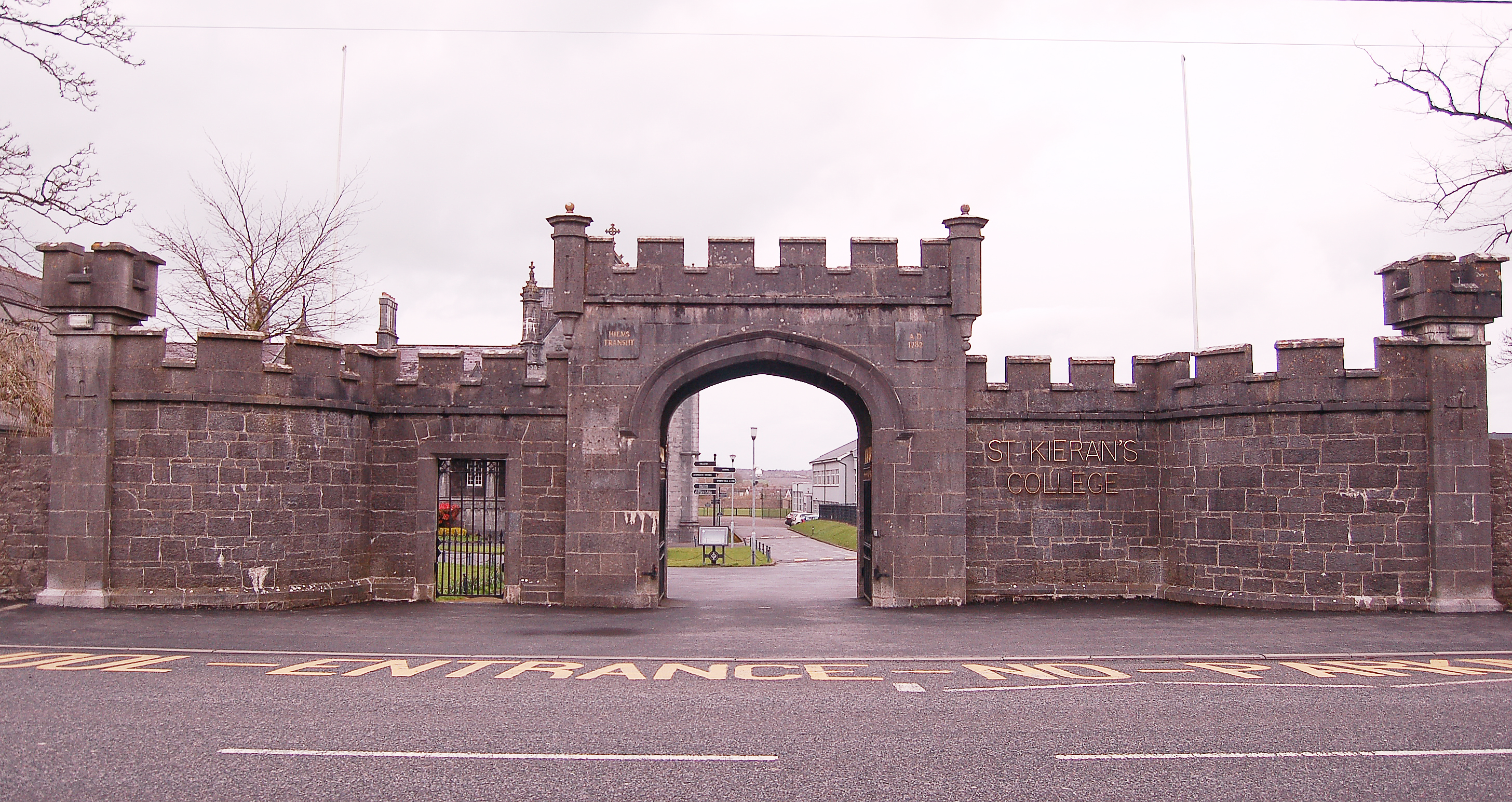
Entrance gate into Kieran's College, originally at Jenkinstown House

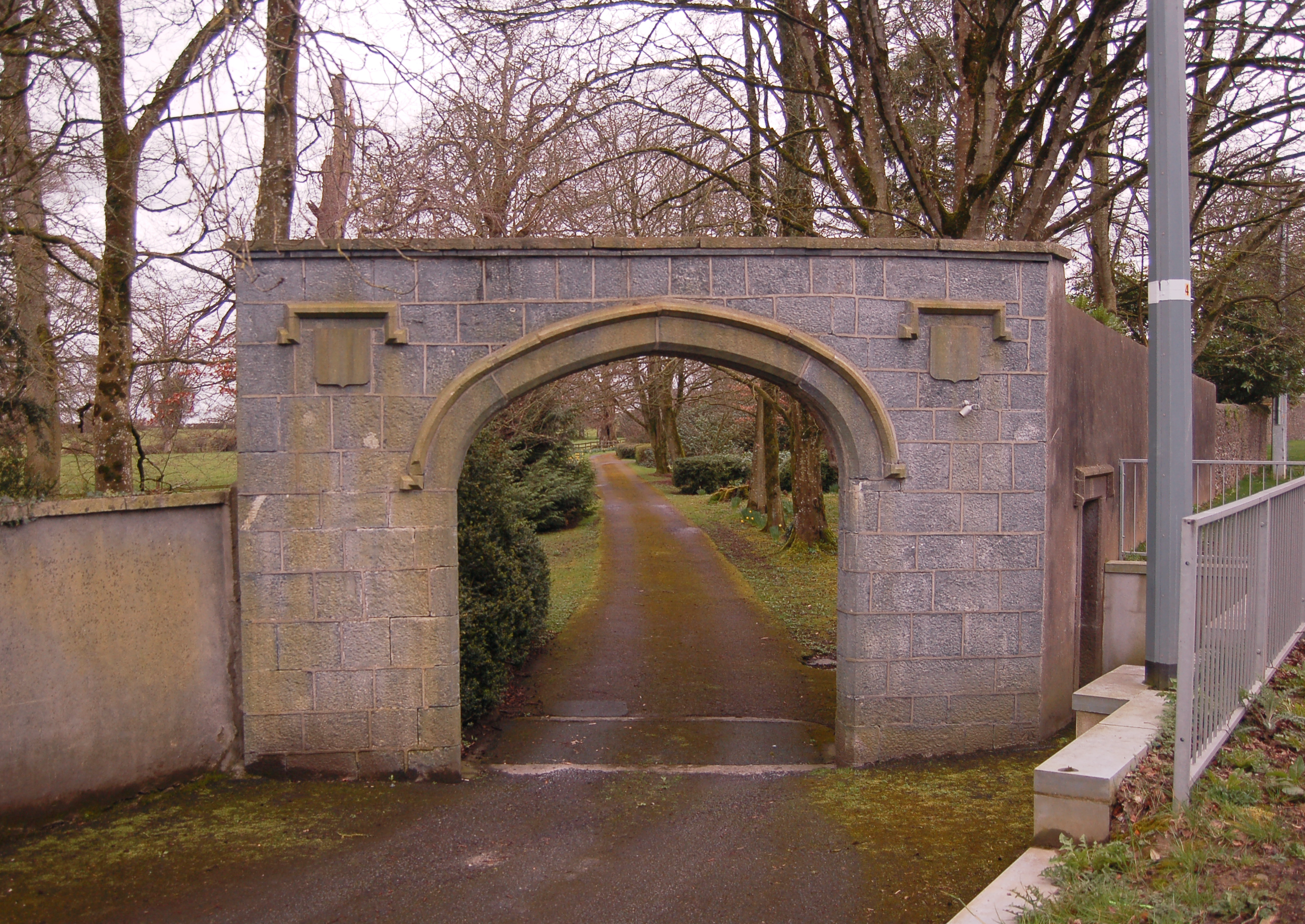
Entrance gate to Orchardton House, Kilkenny

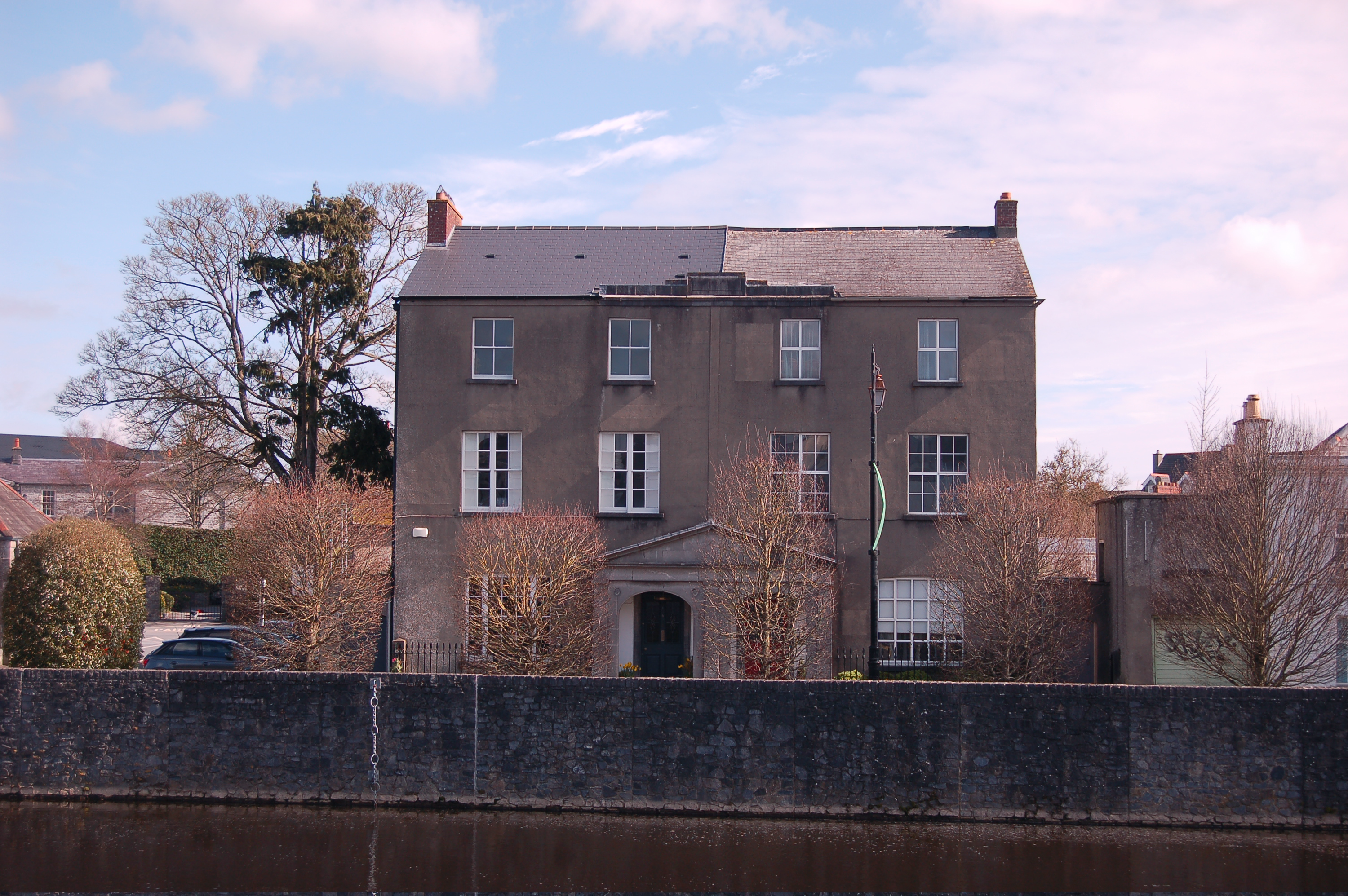
5,6 John's Quay Kilkenny
