= List of people from County Kilkenny =

This is a list of Kilkenny people including those who were born in County Kilkenny, in Ireland and have lived there for most of their lives. Also included on the list are people who were not born in County Kilkenny, but have lived there for most of their lives or are associated with County Kilkenny.

== Art ==
=== Actors ===
- James O'Neill (1847–1920)

=== Architecture ===
- James Hoban (1762–1831)
- William Robertson (1770–1850)

=== Artists ===
- Mildred Anne Butler (1858–1941)
- Gerard Casey (born c.1960)
- Edmund Garvey (1740–1813)

=== Comedians ===
- Mike Rice (born 1991)

=== Painters ===
- Mildred Ann Butler (1858–1941)
- Kathleen Marescaux (1868–1944)
- Tony O'Malley (1913–2003)

=== Sculptor ===
- Christopher Hewetson (1739–1799)

=== Writing ===
- Deborah Alcock (1825–1913), author
- John Banim (1798–1842), novelist
- Hubert Butler (1900–1991), essayist
- James Graves (1815–1886), antiquarian and author
- Constantia Grierson (1705–1732), editor, poet, and classical scholar
- Thomas Kilroy (1934–2023), playwright and novelist
- John Locke (1847–1889), poet, writer and Fenian
- Dónall Mac Amhlaigh (1926–1989), writer
- Brian Mac Giolla Phádraig (c.1580–c.1652), scholar and poet
- Francis MacManus (1909–1965), novelist
- Gerardine Meaney, Irish feminist critic
- John O'Donovan (1806–1861), scholar
- Standish James O'Grady (1846–1928), author, journalist, and historian
- Katharine A. O'Keeffe O'Mahoney (1852–1918), educator, lecturer, writer
- Richard Lalor Sheil (1791–1851), politician, writer and orator

=== Music ===
- John Martyn (1948–2009)
- Seamus Moore (born 1947)
- George William Torrance (1835–1907)
- Ronan Tynan (born 1960)
- Robert Grace

== Military ==
- John Barry (1873–1901), recipient of the Victoria Cross
- Dan Bryan (1900–1985), Army officer
- John Byrne (1832–1879), recipient of the Victoria Cross
- William Dowling (1825–1887), recipient of the Victoria Cross
- Frederick Hall (1885–1915), recipient of the Victoria Cross
- Walter Hamilton (1856–1879), recipient of the Victoria Cross
- Robert Johnston (1872–1950), recipient of the Victoria Cross
- John Ryan (1823–1858), recipient of the Victoria Cross

== Business ==
- Patrick Cudahy (1849–1919), Meat Packer and philanthropist
- James Butler (1855–1934), American Grocery Store and Racetrack owner
- Sean O'Farrell (1909–1972), National Ploughing Association and National Ploughing Championships

== Politicians ==
- Liam Aylward (born 1952)
- Bobby Aylward
- Edward Butler (1823–1879), Australian politician
- James Butler, 1st Duke of Ormonde (1610–1688)
- James Butler, 2nd Duke of Ormonde (1665–1745)
- Piers Butler, 1st Earl of Ormonde (c.1467–1539)
- Thomas Butler, Earl of Ossory (1634–1680)
- Robert Cane (1807–1858)
- Kieran Crotty
- John Dunn, Jr. (1827–1909), American politician
- Kathleen Funchion
- Jim Gibbons (1924–1997), Irish politician, Minister of Agriculture
- Phil Hogan (born c. 1965)
- John McGuinness (born 1955)
- Malcolm Noonan, former Mayor of Kilkenny and Minister of State for Heritage and Electoral Reform since 2020
- Séamus Pattison
- John Paul Phelan
- Ann Phelan
- James Stephens (1825–1901), Fenian
- Margaret Tynan (1930–2007), first woman Mayor of Kilkenny

== Judicial ==
- Peter Smithwick (born 1937), President of the District Court of Ireland 1988–2005

== Religious ==
- William Carrigan (1857–1924)
- James J. Davis (1852–1926)
- Michael Anthony Fleming (c.1792–1850)
- Thomas Francis Hendricken (1827–1886)
- John Ireland (1838–1918)
- Edmund Ignatius Rice (1762–1844)

== Science, education and technology ==
- Robert Barber (1749–1783)
- George Berkeley (1685–1753)
- Abraham Colles (1773–1843)
- Peter Wyse Jackson (born c.1955)
- Aoife Gowen

== History ==
- John Bradley (historian) (1954–2014)
- James Graves (antiquarian) (1815–1886)
- Margaret Phelan (1902–2000), historian
- John G. A. Prim (1821–1875), antiquarian

== Sport ==
- D.J. Carey (born 1970)
- Eddie Keher (born 1941)
- Maeve Kyle (born 1928)
- James Mason (1849–1905), Irish-born chess player
- Sinead Delahunty-Evans, Olympic athlete
- Paddy Mullins (1919–2010), Racehorse trainer
- James Lannon, 2 time ELG Champion
- Sean Patrick Maguire (born 1993) Footballer
- Michael Drennan (born 1994) Footballer

=== Hurling ===
==== Players ====
- Peter Barry
- Eddie Brennan
- Paddy Buggy
- D.J. Carey
- Charlie Carter
- Martin Comerford
- Frank Cummins
- JJ Delaney
- Pa Dillon
- Michael Fennelly
- Ger Fennelly
- Liam Fennelly
- James 'Cha' Fitzpatrick
- Pat Henderson
- Joe Hennessy
- Noel Hickey
- Michael Kavanagh
- Eddie Keher
- Jim Langton
- Eoin Larkin
- Paddy Larkin
- Phil Larkin
- Philly Larkin
- Derek Lyng
- James McGarry
- Lory Meagher
- Liam 'Chunky' O'Brien
- Eddie O'Connor
- Willie O'Connor
- Paddy Phelan
- Richie Power Snr
- Richie Power Jnr
- T. J. Reid
- PJ Ryan
- Henry Shefflin
- Noel Skehan
- John Tennyson
- Jackie Tyrrell
- Jimmy Walsh
- Michael Walsh
- Ollie Walsh
- Tommy Walsh

==== Managers ====
- Brian Cody
- Pat Henderson
- Fr. Tommy Maher
- Ollie Walsh

== People who lived or were educated in Kilkenny ==
- Robert Blackburn (educationalist) (1927–1990), born in Kilkenny
- Michael Byrne (1761–?)
- John Clyn (14th century)
- William Congreve (1670–1729)
- Joseph Fiennes
- Ralph Fiennes
- Henry Flood (1732–1791), Statesman and orator
- Oisín Kelly (1915–1981)
- Lionel of Antwerp, Duke of Clarence (1338–1368)
- Theobald Mathew (1790–1856)
- Séamus Pattison (1936–2018)
- Robert Clarke Shearman (1825–1910), New Zealand policeman and farmer, born in Kilkenny
- Jonathan Swift (1667–1745)

== People who died or are buried in Kilkenny ==
- John Lavery (1856–1941)

== Other people associated with Kilkenny ==
- Max Adrian (1903–1973), actor, noted for Shakespearean roles and a favourite of Ken Russell
- Anne Anderson, Irish ambassador to the United States
- Lady Mary Butler (1689–1713)
- Mabel Cahill, U.S. Open Tennis Champion
- Senator Ellen Cuffe, Countess of Desart (1857–1933), philanthropist
- Patrick Joyce, aka Achmet Borumborad, a Kilkenny man who masqueraded as a Turk for a period in the late eighteenth century in Dublin.
- Dame Alice Kyteler (1280–c.1325)
- Saint Brendan (460–577)
- Saint Canice (525–599)
- Saint Fiachra (died 670)
- Saint Finbarr (c.550–c.620)
- Saint Kieran (350–400)
- Thomas Nash, Irish fisherman, settled in Newfoundland and Labrador, Canada; founder of Branch, Newfoundland and Labrador

== See also ==
- Viscount Mountgarret
- List of Irish people
- The Riordans
