= List of Irish learned societies =

This is a partial list of notable learned societies, professional bodies and engineering societies operating in Ireland:

- Accounting Technicians Ireland, formerly the Institute of Accounting Technicians in Ireland (IATI)
- Archives and Records Association, Ireland^{†}
- Bar Council of Ireland
- British and Irish Association of Law Librarians
- British Computer Society^{†}
- Chartered Accountants Ireland
- Dublin Philosophical Society
- Galway Archaeological and Historical Society
- Geographical Society of Ireland^{†}
- Honorable Society of King's Inns
- Institute of Chartered Accountants in Ireland (ICAI)
- Institute of Chemistry of Ireland
- Institute of Physics ^{‡}
- Institution of Engineers of Ireland
- Irish Archaeological Society
- Irish Association of Physicists in Medicine (IAPM)^{¥}
- Irish Computer Society^{¥}
- Irish Hospitality Institute
- Irish Institute of Legal Executives
- Irish Institute of Medical Herbalists
- Irish Manuscripts Commission
- Irish Mathematical Society
- Irish Medical Organisation
- Irish Nutrition and Dietetic Institute
- Irish Planning Institute
- Irish Professional Photographers Association
- Irish Recorded Music Association
- Irish Texts Society
- Institute and Faculty of Actuaries
- Institute of Physics and Engineering in Medicine (IPEM)^{†}
- Kilkenny Archaeological Society
- Law Society of Ireland
- Library Association of Ireland
- Microscopical Society of Ireland^{†}
- Pathological Society of Great Britain and Ireland
- Pharmaceutical Society Of Ireland
- Psychological Society of Ireland
- Royal Academy of Medicine in Ireland
- Royal Anthropological Institute of Great Britain and Ireland
- Royal College of Surgeons in Ireland
- Royal College of Physicians of Ireland
- Royal Dublin Society
- Royal Geological Society of Ireland
- Royal Hibernian Academy
- Royal Institute of the Architects of Ireland
- Royal Irish Academy
- Royal Microscopical Society^{‡}
- Royal Society of Antiquaries of Ireland
- School of Irish Learning
- Society of Actuaries in Ireland
- Society for Musicology in Ireland
- Zoological Society of Ireland

^{‡} Established before partition, and represents professionals both in Britain and Ireland

^{†} Established after partition, and represents professionals both in Britain and Northern Ireland

^{¥} Primarily operates in the Republic of Ireland

== See also ==
- List of Ireland-related topics
- List of Irish cultural institutions
- List of learned societies
