= Ellen Prendergast =

Ireland's first female professional archaeologist

Ellen M. Prendergast
- Born: June 11, 1918; Killure, County Kilkenny
- Died: May 10, 1999 (aged 80)
- Education: University College Dublin
- Occupation: archaeologist

Ellen M. Prendergast (11 June 1918–10 May 1999) was Ireland's first female professional archaeologist.

== Early life and education ==
Ellen M. Prendergast was born at Killure near Paulstown, County Kilkenny as one of a pair of twin girls, her sister was named Catherine. She was educated in the Brigidine Convent school in Mountrath. She was a boarder there and it was here that Helen Roe (1895–1988), Laois county librarian, inspired her about archaeology with lessons on local history.

In 1938 Prendergast took up a post as Technical Assistant at the National Museum of Ireland, and attended University College Dublin where she completed a BA in 1943, and in 1947 an MA, in Celtic Archaeology.

== Career ==
Prendergast spent her professional life working in the National Museum of Ireland, specialising in areas including burials of the later Neolithic period, prehistoric pottery and Early Bronze Age cist burials. She remained deeply interested in the archaeology of County Kilkenny and was a regular contributor for the Old Kilkenny Review, and she was a member of the Irish Archaeological Society committee from 1945.

In addition to her involvement in history, Prendergast was known as a feminist and trade unionist, and a supporter of the Irish language.

When she retired in 1983 Prendergast returned to live in Kilkenny.

Ellen Prendergast continued to write and publish on archaeology and history until shortly before her death on 10 May 1999.

== Papers ==
- The Stoneyford Roman Finds.Archaeology Ireland, vol. 3, no. 4, 1989, pp. 159–159
- Bronze Age Burials in Co. Westmeath. The Journal of the Royal Society of Antiquaries of Ireland vol. 75, no. 2, 1945, pp. 107–111
- A fertility figure from Tullaroan, 1992
- A souterrain at Scurlockstown, 1971
- Amber Necklace from Co Galway, 1960
- Bronze Age Burials, Co Wexford, 1953
- Bronze Age burials in Co Westmeath, 1945
- Burial at Rossmakay, Co Louth, 1957
- Burials at Stephenstown, 1970
- Castlegarden sweat-house, Co Kilkenny, 1991
- Cist burial at Bolinready, Co Wexford, 1968
- Excavation of a mound at Blessington, Co Wicklow, 1946
- Group of bronzes from Charleville Forest, Co Offaly, 1961
- Images of the Holy Trinity – two new examples, 1993
- National Museum of Ireland: archaeological acquisitions in the year 1965, 1968
- Prehistoric Burial at Rath, Co Wicklow, 1959
- Report on investigation of souterrain at Dowdallshill, Dundalk, 1968
- Ring-fort with Souterrain at Gorteen, Co Westmeath, 1959
- The history of the Abbotsbury duck decoy 1655–1982, 1985
- The history of the Morden duck decoy 1724, 1985
- Two Souterrains in Co Meath, 1962
- Two unrecorded graveslabs in County Dublin, 1977
- Urn Burial at Maganey Lower, Co Kildare, 1962
- Colonel Dan Bryan – Obituary, 1985

== Old Kilkenny Review Articles ==
- * "Pre-Historic Cooking places in Webbsborough District", Old Kilkenny Review, 1955.
- * "The Moat of Ballyfoyle", Old Kilkenny Review, 1958.
- * "Bronze axehead from Annaleck Upper, civil parish of Powerstown", Old Kilkenny Review, 1958.
- * "Souterrain recently discovered in Kilkenny at Kildalton, Piltown", Old Kilkenny Review, 1958.
- * "Kiln at Luffany, Co Kilkenny", Old Kilkenny Review, 1960.
- *"Prehistoric burial site at Slieverue, Co Kilkenny" Old Kilkenny Review, 1960.
- * "Prehistoric grave at Jeanville, Powerstown, near Gowran", Old Kilkenny Review, 1962.
- * "Ancient cemetery at Coolmore, Knocktopher – cist graves", Old Kilkenny Review, 1963.
- * "New High Cross at Leggettsrath", Old Kilkenny Review, 1964.
- * "Carved stone head in the care of the Nolan family of Glenbower", Old Kilkenny Review,1965.
- * "Burials at Gallowshill, Kilkenny", Old Kilkenny Review, 1970.
- * "Smithstown axe-head found near Thomastown", Old Kilkenny Review,1970.
- * "Burial of the Bronze Age at Moyne, Durrow, Co Laois", Old Kilkenny Review, 1974.
- * "Fulacht fiadh at Firgrove near Inistioge", Old Kilkenny Review, 1976. * "Fulacht fiadh at Ballyhimmin, near Castlecomer", Old Kilkenny Review, 1977.
- * "Medieval jug from Castleinch or Inchyologhan", Old Kilkenny Review, 1977.
- * "A bronze axehead from Tullaroan area", Old Kilkenny Review, 1981.
- * "Two artefacts of the Bronze Age from County Kilkenny (spearhead from 1984 Tullaroan and axehead from Rathcash, Clifden)", Old Kilkenny Review, 1984.
- * "A spearhead with a difference – found by James Healy of Rathkyle, near 1985 Conahy", Old Kilkenny Review, 1985."The Vigors collection", Old Kilkenny Review, 1985.
- * "An ancient repair method to a bronze spearhead", Old Kilkenny Review, 1986.
- * "The birthplace at Higginstown of Fr Matt Keeffe (1811–1887), Callan curate", Old Kilkenny Review, 1987.
- * "Viking sword from Harley Park, parish of Ballingarry", Old Kilkenny Review, 1991.
- * "Fertility figure, or Sheelagh-na-Gig, from Tullaroan", Old Kilkenny Review, 1992.
- * "Images of the Holy Trinity: two new examples, at St Rioch's Kilkenny and 1993 Ballybromhill, Co Carlow", Old Kilkenny Review, 1993.
