= Killure =

Killure is the name of several places in Ireland:

- Killure, County Waterford, a townland in the Republic of Ireland near Waterford Airport
- Killure, County Kilkenny, near Goresbridge in the Republic of Ireland
- Killure, County Londonderry in Northern Ireland
