= Shrine of St Caillín =

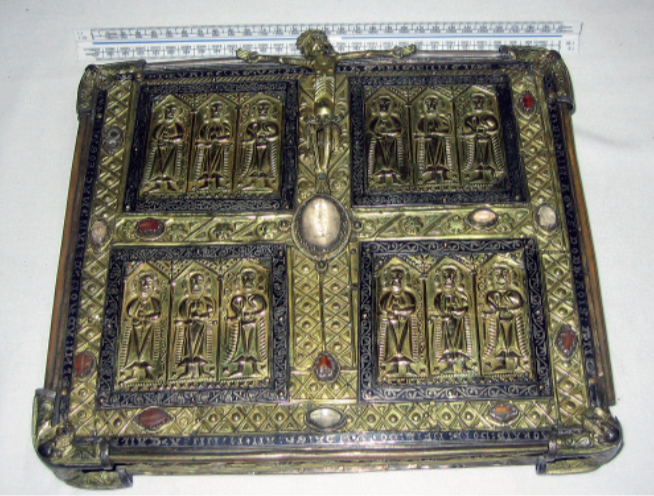
The Shrine of Caillín, 1536

The Shrine of St Caillín is a metal cumdach (a book-shaped shrine) built before 1536 to hold and protect the 15th century Book of Fenagh manuscript.

It has been described as "something of a specialist in the production of battle talismans" and according to legend, in his lifetime commissioned a number of battle standards, including this shrine. There is some doubt as to if the shrine was intended as a cumdach, given that it is smaller than the manuscript.

== Description ==
The shrine consists of an oak box overlain with die-stamped gilt brass ornaments on a silver frame. The decorations consist of abstract insular art patterns as well the depiction of a number of human figures.

== Condition ==
The shrine was in good condition until it was badly damaged in the 2009 fire that destroyed large parts of St Mel's Cathedral, Longford, where it had been kept since 1980.000

It was acquired by the National Museum of Ireland the following year, while the manuscript is in the collection of the Royal Irish Academy.

== Sources ==
- Mullarkey, Paul. The Shrine of St Caillín of Fenagh and its place in Irish late medieval art. The Royal Irish Academy, September 2016
- Lucas, Anthony. "The Social Role of Relics and Reliquaries in Ancient Ireland". The Journal of the Royal Society of Antiquaries of Ireland, volume 116, 1986. JSTOR 25508904
- Scott, Brendan. "The Making of the Book of Fenagh". History Ireland, volume 25, no. 3, 2017. JSTOR 90014529
