= St. Kieran's Well, Kilkenny =

Holy well in Kilkenny

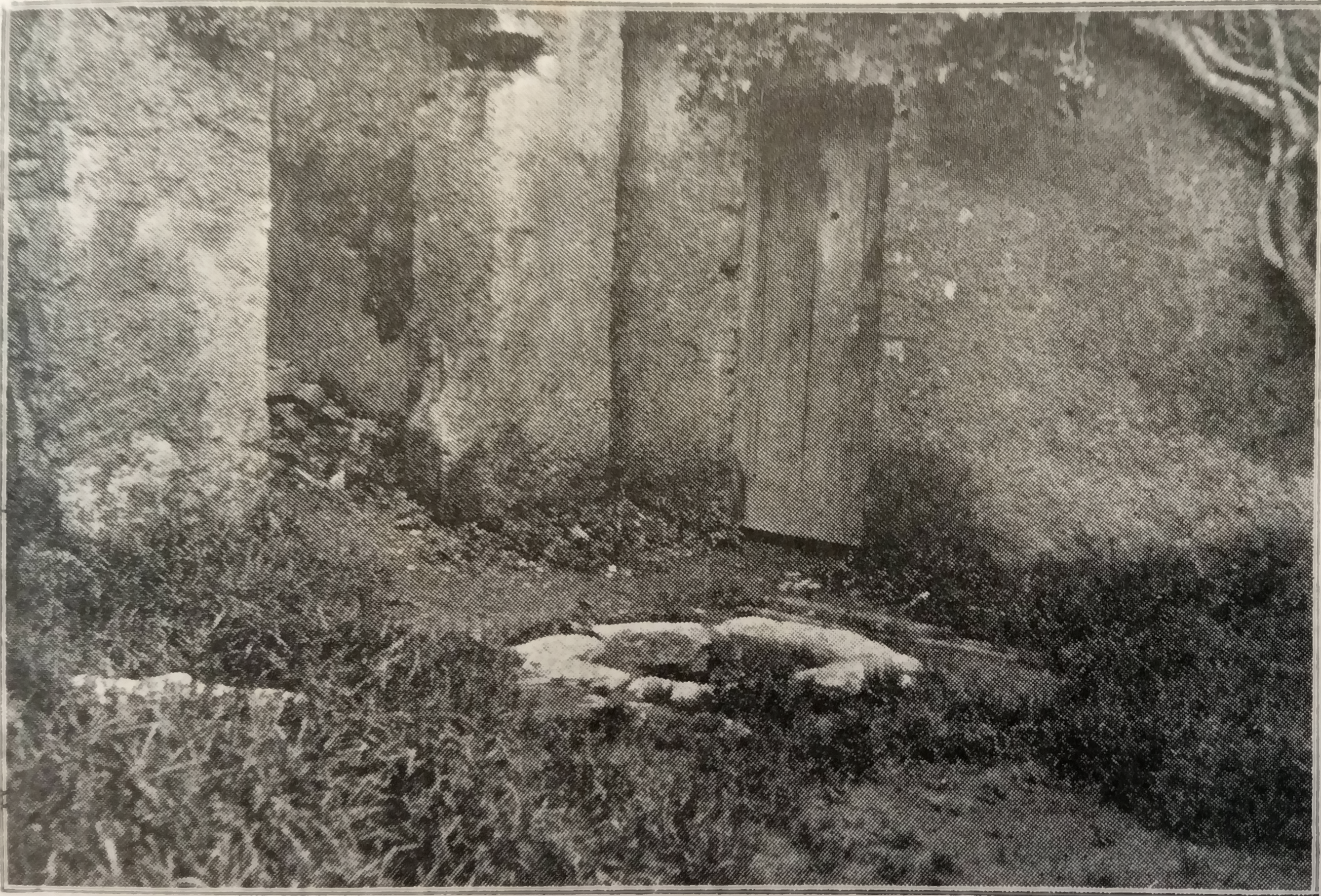
St. Kieran's Well around 1905

St. Kieran's Well, also St. Kyran's Well, Keverock's Well or Kerock's Well, was a holy well in Kilkenny known since at least the 13th century. Now situated in what is now the smoking area of Kyteler's Inn, it was located in the vicinity of the pre-Norman St. Kieran's Church which was demolished as late as the beginning of the 19th century. The street it was located on has since the 1930s been called St. Kieran Street or Kieran Street for short (named after the well), but was called King Street, Back Lane and Low Lane before that.

The well was historically associated with the building referred to as "Kyteler's Hall" (in 1449) and later "Kyteler's Inn", itself associated with the Kyteler family and Alice Kyteler.

== History ==
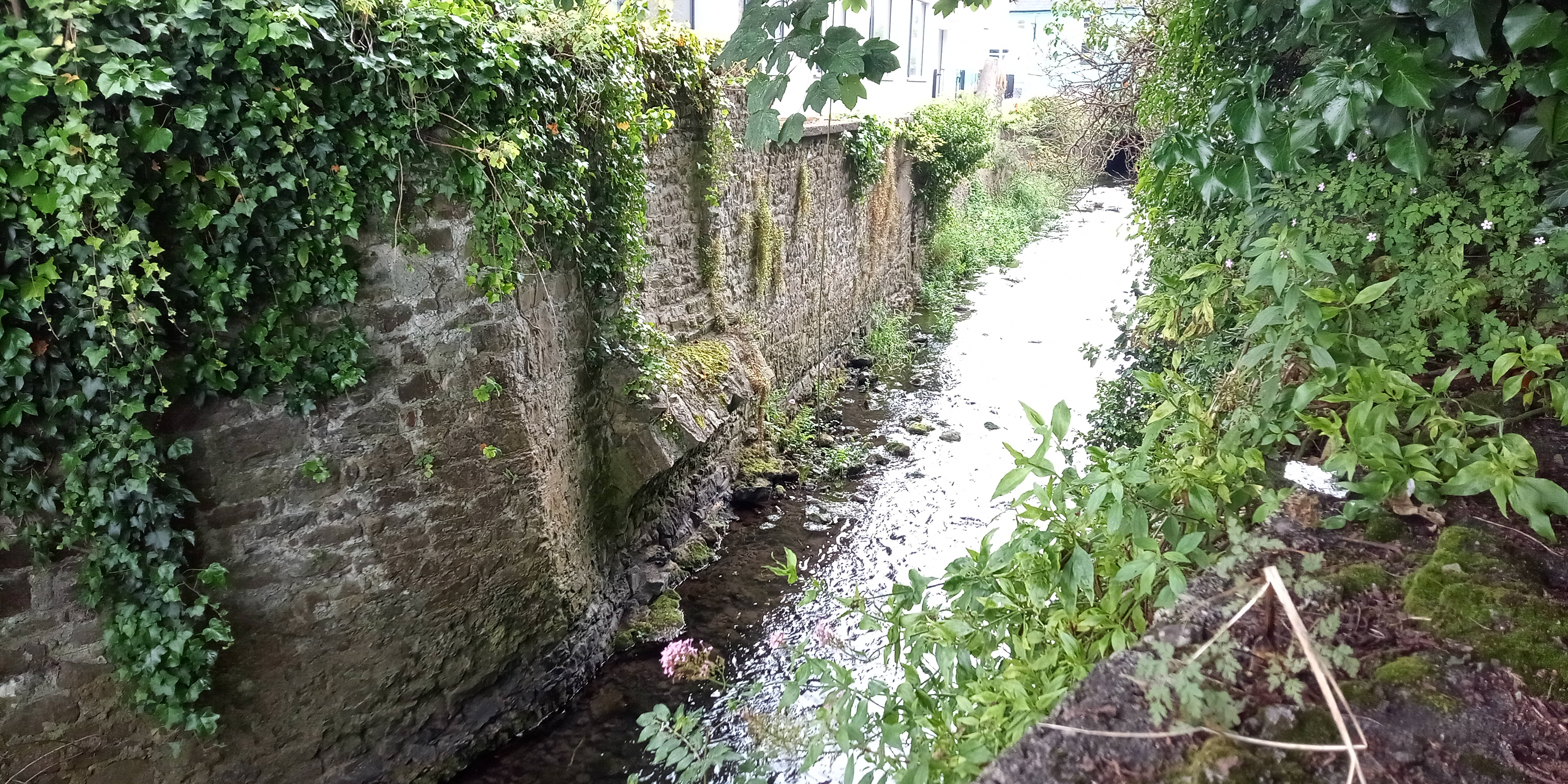
Stump of Cotterell's Bridge over the Breagagh River

The holy well was first mentioned as a reference to the enlargement of High Town or English town (ad ampliandum Villam) as documented in the Liber Albus Ossoriensis in a charter by Bishop Hugh Rufus to William Marshal which defines the land to be granted as lying between Cotterell's Bridge and St. Kieran's Well. The historian John Hogan does not provide a date with this charter, but John Bradley dates it to (around) 1207. (Note: John Bradley in the Towns Atlas for Kilkenny dates the expansion to c.1207, see there, and dates the charter to 1207 in his 2009 book.)

The well is referenced several times in legal documents over the centuries, such as in 1688, 1745 and 1811, some of which are royal charters, such as the 1639 charter by Charles I concerning a rent "arising out of a house anciently called Kytelar’s Inn near Kyran's Well".

The holy well site is not marked on the 6 inch Ordnance Survey maps, 25 inch Ordnance Survey maps, nor the 1871 Ordnance Survey map. Some sources speak of two springs or wells, and the word "Wells" is legible on an 1841 Ordnance Survey map.

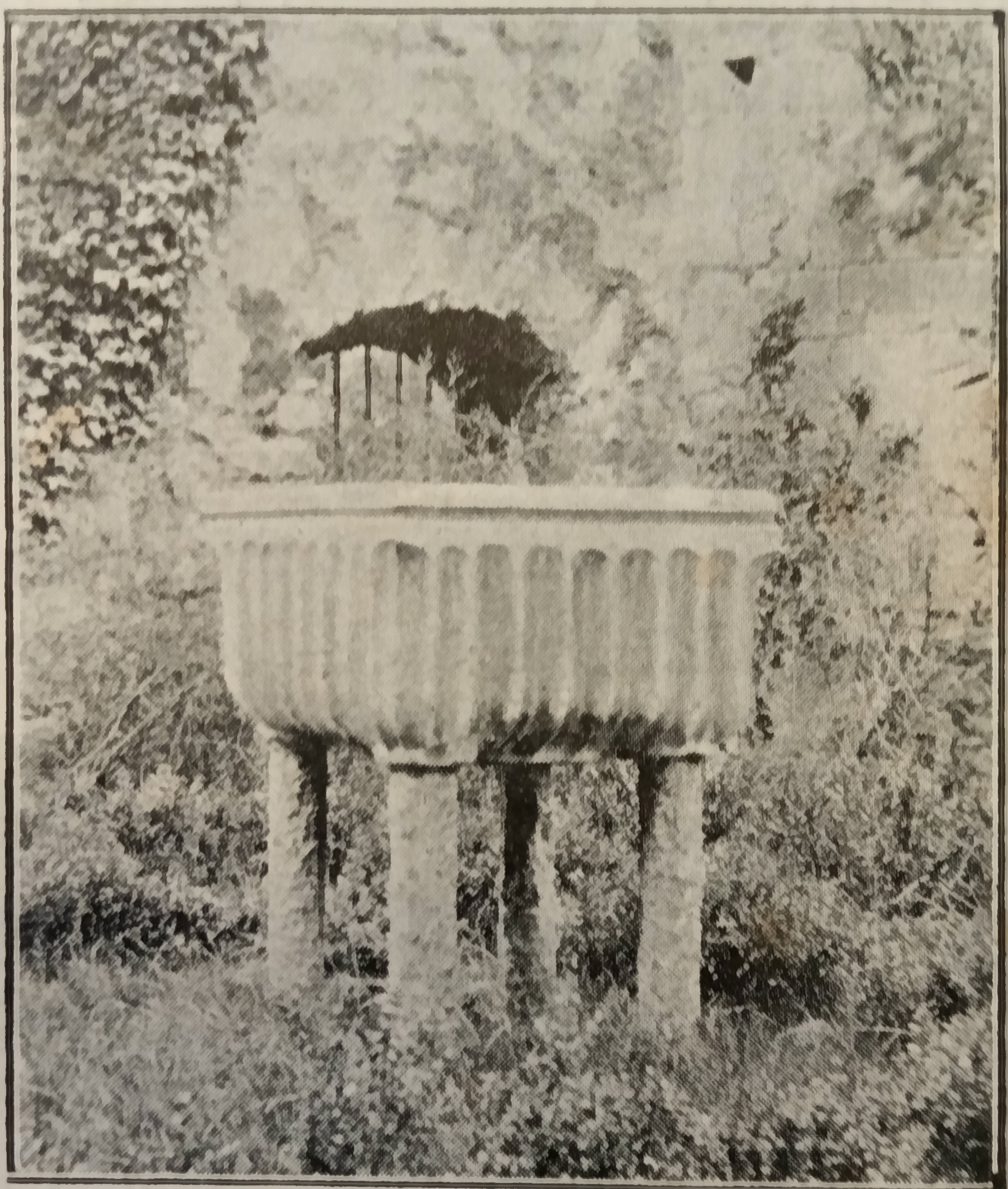
Photograph (from Carrigan's book) of the baptismal font in its new location at St Francis' Abbey; The legs are a later addition.

In Kilkenny: The Ancient City of Ossory (1884), John Hogan dedicates several pages to St. Kieran's Well, stating that "there is in the small lawn at the rear of this old fabric one of the most beautiful spring wells in the city of Kilkenny". He mentions a "baptismal font of Kilkenny marble, through the orifice in the bottom of which the water of this beautiful fountain is constantly bubbling up". He presumes that the baptismal font might have come from St. Kieran's Church and later used by the Ryan family of Back Lane (aka Kieran Street).

Canon William Carrigan adds to this in 1905, stating that this baptismal font was moved to St. Francis' Abbey in "about 1889". This move from Mr. Ayres' property to "near the east window of St. Francis'" is attested in the Kilkenny Moderator of July 27th 1889, where it is presumed that the font had been originally at St. Francis' Friary. This is given as the reason why it was moved (back) there. This article suspects that Alice Kyteler committed the theft of the baptismal font herself "for its subsequent use in her nefarious practice." It describes the font as being of "black marble" (i.e. the Kilkenny limestone referred to as "Kilkenny Marble") and weighing 11 cwt. The size is described as 31 inches square on top, diameter of the basin 21.5 inches and of 2.5 inches depth, with the external depth being 19 inches. The pillars, also visible in the photographs have a diameter of four inches and length of 14.5 in. The decoration has "carved in low relief the vine-leaf trefoil".

The holy well was still existing and in use in March 1967, when Kyteler's Inn's refurbishment (Note: Not a "restoration", because much of the original fabric was destroyed.) under architect Colm Ó Cochláin was completed and the pub blessed with water from the well. This was reported in the Kilkenny People of March 17, 1967 as follows:

"A BLESSING of a very special kind took place o Wednesday of this week when V Rev C. J. Sherin of St. Mary's, Kilkenny, blessed the recently restored Kyteler Inn in Kieran street.

The interesting part about it is that the water which he use for the blessing, was taken from the St Kieran's holy well in the courtyard of the Inn.

The well is reputed to be the oldest in Kilkenny and was the site of pilgrimages for many centuries. Today, the waters are as clear as ever in the courtyard, which is dominated by a huge chestnut tree."

In the second edition of Katherine Lanigan's book Kilkenny Its Architecture and History in 1986, the well is described as: "East of the house in the court yard is the Well of St Ciaran - a clear bubbling stream surrounded by masonry."

Colm O'Cochláin describes the wells in his 1987 book about the 1960s restoration work:

"In summer time guests can relax in the lovely old world courtyard shaded by a spreading chestnut tree, and drink cooling draughts of the famous local beer by the side of the 1200 year old holy well of St. Kieran.

The wells were cleaned and the upstand protective stones reset.

The water cleared after some months and was very refreshing to drink. It comes from high ground at St. Mary's Cathedral and was boxed in in stone drains underneath the cellar floor.

[...] Unfortunately today road works and other alterations around the Cathedral area disturbed the ancient water courses and the present flow has become sluggish and the water polluted."

A 2008 report in relation to planning permissions quotes the Office of Public Works Urban Survey file describing the (re-)discovery of the wells in 1966: "There are two domestic wells in the yard behind [Kyteler's Inn] which were revealed during restoration work in 1966."

The same report quotes a February 1995 archaeological survey of Kyteler's in preparation for further changes on the fabric which describes the wells and their effect on the excavation as follows: "Excavation commenced at the northern side of the yard working southeastwards. Water ingress was so great that, in spite of the use of a pump, the excavation had to be temporarily abandoned (the water supply simply turned the soils into sludge). The two medieval wells, on the northeastern side of the yard which were reinstated during the paving of the yard for use as a ‘beer garden’ may be fed from the water source which flooded the trench."

Several floor plans contained in planning permission applications show the location of the wells in the courtyard, however, they are not labelled as such.

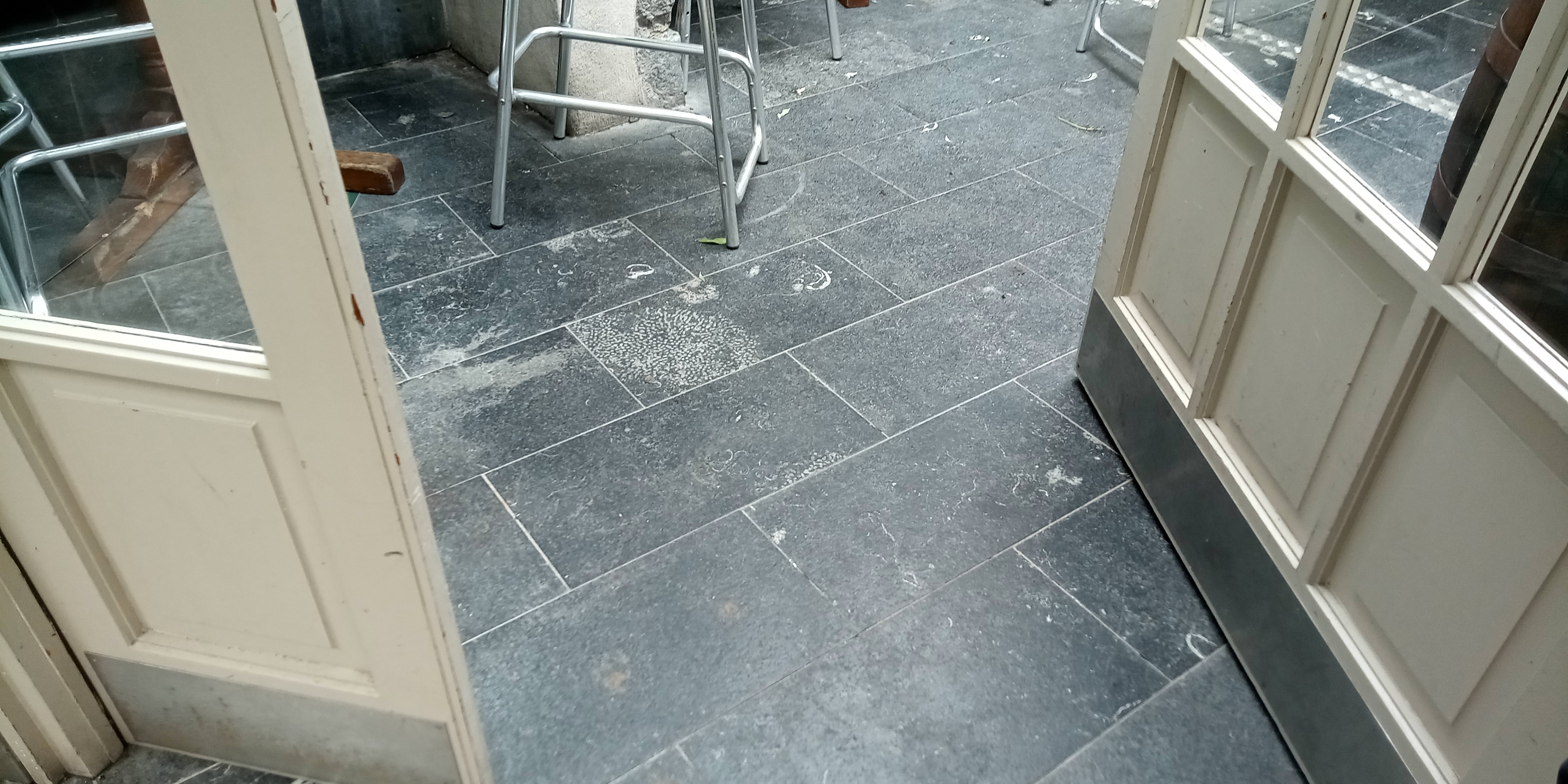
Approximate location of the well in Kyteler's Inn premises

According to Pádraig Ó Dálaigh's 2018 PhD thesis, the well was eventually covered over in 2013 with indistinct slabs, when another refurbishment of Kyteler's Inn took place. As of 2024, there is no inscription or plaque to mark the site.
