= John Bradley (historian) =

Irish historian and archaeologist (1954–2014)

- Born: 11 January 1954
- Died: 7 November 2014 (aged 60)
- Education: Kilkenny CBS Secondary School; University College Dublin
- Occupation: Lecturer in Archaeology at UCD
- Organization(s): Fellow of the Society of Antiquaries, Kilkenny Archaeological Society
- Known for: Pioneer of urban archaeology in Ireland

John Bradley (11 January 1954 – 7 November 2014) was a historian and archaeologist at NUI Maynooth. He grew up in Kilkenny and published many papers about his hometown.

He worked with Professor George Eogan at the archaeological excavations at Knowth.

He left a large corpus of works that he had either written or edited and was very committed to publishing. He has been described, in the newsletter of the Institute of Archaeologists of Ireland, as "the first and foremost Irish medieval archaeologist, urban historian, raconteur, font of knowledge on literature, film, chess, opera and so many other subjects. A Kilkenny man par excellence, and a great loss to archaeology and life". The Kilkenny Archaeological Society, of which he was a member, holds an annual conference in his memory.

He was also an avid chess player and was a member of the Kilkenny Chess Club from 1972.

== Works ==
- Bradley, John (1984). Viking Dublin exposed: the Wood Quay saga.
- Lucas, A T. Bradley, John (ed.). Cattle in Ancient Ireland.
- Bradley, John (2000). Discover Kilkenny. Dublin: O’Brien Press.
- Bradley, John (2000). Irish Historic Towns Atlas, no. 10. Royal Irish Academy.
- Bradley, John (2003). Treasures of Kilkenny: charters and civic records of Kilkenny city. Kilkenny Borough Council.
- Bradley, John (2009). The Kilkenny city charter of 1609. Kilkenny Borough Council.
- Bradley, John; O'Dwyer, Michael, eds. (2009). Kilkenny through the centuries: chapters in the history of an Irish city. Kilkenny Borough Council.
- Bradley, John; Fletcher, Alan J.; Simms, Anngret, eds. (2009). Dublin in the medieval world: studies in honour of Howard B Clarke. Dublin: Four Courts.

=== Papers ===
- Bradley, John (1986). "The medieval towns of Kerry". North Munster Antiquarian Journal Xxviii: 28–39.
- Bradley, John (1987). Jäger, H. (ed.). "Recent archaeological research on the Irish town". Stadtkernforschung. Städteforschung A/27. Bohlau Verlag (Köln-Wien): 321–70.
- Bradley, John (1987). Rynne, E. (ed.). "The Ballyhale Madonna and its iconography". Figures from the Past: Essays and Studies in Honour of H. M. Roe. Dublin: Glendale Press: 258–77.
- Bradley, John (1988). "The medieval borough of Bunratty". North Munster Antiquarian Journal XXX: 19–25.
- Bradley, JOohn (1988). Bradley, John (ed.). "Archaeological remains of the Llanthony granges at Duleek and Colp". Settlement and Society in Medieval Ireland: Studies Presented to F. X. Martin, O.s.a. Boethius Press, Kilkenny.
- Bradley, John (1988). Bradley, John (ed.). "The interpretation of Scandinavian settlement in Ireland". Settlement and Society in Medieval Ireland: Studies Presented to F. X. Martin, O.s.a. Boethius Press, Kilkenny: 49–78.
- Bradley, John (1988). MacNiocaill, G.; Wallace, P. F. (eds.). "Anglo-Norman sarcophagi from Ireland". Keimelia: Studies in Medieval Archaeology and History in Memory of Tom Delaney. Galway University Press: 74–94.
- Bradley, John (1989). "The chantry college Ardee". County Louth Archaeological & Historical Society Journal. 22 (1): 16–19. doi:10.2307/27729670. JSTOR 27729670.
- Bradley, John (1988–1989). "The medieval towns of Co. Meath". Ríocht na Midhe viii: 2: 30–49.
- Bradley, John (1990). Slater, T. R. (ed.). "The role of town plan analysis in the study of the Irish medieval town". The Built Form of Western Cities: Essays for M. R. G. Conzen on the Occasion of His Eightieth Birthday. Leicester University Press: 39–59.
- Bradley, John (1990). Nolan, W. (ed.). "The early development of the medieval town of Kilkenny". Kilkenny: History and Society. Geography Publications, Dublin: 63–73.
- Bradley, John The precinct of St John's Priory, Kilkenny, at the close of the Middle Ages, in Pertitia, 317–345 (2012)
- Bradley, J. The purpose of the Pale: a view from Kilkenny, in Michael Potterton and Thomas Herron (eds), Dublin and the Pale in the Renaissance, c.1540-1660. Dublin, Four Courts (2011)
- Bradley, J. Waterford: patronage and position, Irish Arts Review, 28: 3; 99–102 (2011)
- Bradley, J. With Cóilín Ó Drisceoil, Richard Jennings, Leah McCullough and John Healy. The Kilkenny Archaeological Project, Old Kilkenny Review 61, pp. 7–19 (2009)
- Bradley, J.: Introduction, in John Bradley & Michael O'Dwyer (eds) Kilkenny through the centuries: chapters in the history of an Irish city. Kilkenny Borough Council, pp. x–xii (2009)
- Bradley, John: Anglo-Norman Kilkenny, in John Bradley & Michael O'Dwyer (eds) Kilkenny through the centuries: chapters in the history of an Irish city. Kilkenny Borough Council pp. 24–45 (2009)
- Bradley, J. From frontier town to Renaissance city: Kilkenny 1500-1700, in John Bradley & Michael O'Dwyer, (eds), Kilkenny through the centuries: chapters in the history of an Irish city, Kilkenny Borough Council, pp. 96–119 (2009)
- Bradley, John (2003). Dublin in the year 1000. The Sir John T. Gilbert Commemorative Lecture. Dublin: 2000 Dublin City Public Libraries.
- Bradley, J. Canice and Kilkenny, in John Bradley & Michael O'Dwyer (eds) Kilkenny through the centuries: chapters in the history of an Irish city. Kilkenny Borough Council, pp. 1–23 (2009)
- Bradley, J. With Alan J. Fletcher and Anngret Simms, Laudatio, in John Bradley, Alan J Fletcher, & Anngret Simms (eds) Dublin in the medieval world: studies in honour of Howard B Clarke. Dublin Four Courts (2009)
- Bradley, J. Foreword, in Michael Potterton and Matthew Seaver (eds) Uncovering medieval Trim: archaeological excavations in and around Trim, Co. Meath. Dublin, Four Courts. pp. 19–22 (2009).
- Bradley, J. Archaeology in Ireland's journals, 2008 Archaeology Ireland 23: 1, (Spring 2009).
- Bradley, J. Dublin in the year 1000, in Máire Kennedy and Alastair Smeaton (eds), The Sir John T. Gilbert commemorative lectures 1998-2007. Dublin City Public Libraries, pp. 45–56 (2009)
- Bradley, J. With Cóilín Ó Drisceoil, Richard Jennings, John Healy and Leah McCullough. Can Humpty Dumpty be put back together again? The Kilkenny Archaeological Project, Archaeology Ireland 23 (Summer 2009).
- Bradley, J. A lease of 1573 relating to the Corpus Christi plays in Kilkenny, Old Kilkenny Review 60; 54–69 (2008)
- Bradley, J. With Declan Murphy, Cóilín Ó Drisceoil and Máire Downey, Kilkenny city's M3, in Archaeology Ireland, 22: 3; 14–16, (Autumn 2008)
- Bradley, J. Kilkenny, past and present, Irish Arts Review 25: 2; 108-13 (Summer 2008)
- Bradley, J. Towards a definition of the Irish monastic town in Catherine Karkov and Helen Damico (eds) Aedificia Nova: studies in honor of Rosemary Cramp. Medieval Academy of America, Kalamazoo, MI, pp 325–60 (2008)
- Bradley, J. Sir Henry Sidney's bridge at Athlone 1566-7, in Thomas Herron and Michael Potterton (eds), Ireland in the Renaissance, c.1540-1660. Four Courts Press, Dublin. pp. 173–94 (2007)
- Bradley, J. Archaeology in Ireland's journals 2007, Archaeology Ireland 21: 4; pp. 37–41. (Winter 2007)
- Bradley, J. Alice Kyteler (ca.1260/5 - after 1324), in R. M. Golden (ed), Encyclopedia of witchcraft, the western tradition (4 vols, Santa Barbara, CA), vol. iii, pp. 613–15 (2006)
- Bradley, J. The town wall of Kilkenny revisited - a review article Old Kilkenny Review 58; pp. 185–95 (2006)
- Bradley, J. The creation of The Parade: Ormond's deal with Kilkenny Corporation, 1677 Old Kilkenny Review 58; pp. 77–116 (2006)
- Bradley, John (2006). "A tale of three cities: Bristol, Chester, Dublin and the coming of the Normans". H. B. Clarke and J. R. S. Phillips (Eds), Ireland, England and the Continent in the Middle Ages and Beyond, Essays in Memory of a Turbulent Friar, F. X. Martin, O.s.a. Dublin: 51–66.
- Bradley, J. Archaeology in Ireland's journals, 2006, Archaeology Ireland 20: 4; pp. 37–41, (Winter, 2006)
- Bradley, J. The decline and fall of Gaelic Leinster - a review article Old Kilkenny Review 57; pp. 118–24 (2005)
- Bradley, J. The pre-Reformation priors of St John's (O.S.A.), Kilkenny, Old Kilkenny Review 57; pp. 62–74 (2005)
- Bradley, J. Opposing systems: institutional continuity as an agent of social change, in Tom Condit and Christiaan Corlett (eds) Above and beyond, papers in memory of Leo Swan. Wordwell, Bray. pp. 409–14 (2005)
- Bradley, J. Kilkenny: Irish historic towns atlas supplement to History Ireland, 6 pp. (Spring 2005)
- Bradley, J. Entries on: ‘Bridges’, ‘Carolingian’, ‘Kildare’, ‘Kilkenny’, Mills and milling’, ‘Tara’, ‘Trim’, ‘Villages’, ‘Walled towns’, in Sean Duffy (ed) Medieval Ireland: an encyclopedia. Routledge, London. (2005)
- Bradley, J. Archaeology in Ireland's journals, Archaeology Ireland 19: 4; (Winter 2005)
- Bradley, J. Death, art and burial: St Canice's cathedral Kilkenny in the sixteenth century in Colum P Hourihane (ed) Irish art historical studies in honour of Peter Harbison. Four Courts, Dublin. pp. 210–218 (2004)
- Bradley, J. The role of the Irish Historic Towns Atlas as a source for urban history, in Howard Clarke, Jacinta Prunty and Mark Hennessy (eds) Surveying Ireland's past, multidisciplinary essays in honour of Anngret Simms. Geography Publications. pp. 727–746 (2004)
- Bradley, J. and Märit Gaimster Medieval Britain and Ireland in 2003 in Medieval Archaeology 48; pp. 229–350 (2004)
- Bradley, John (2004). Coles, John; Grogan, Eoin; Raftery, Barry; Roche, Helen (eds.). "Moynagh Lough in the Late Bronze Age". From Megaliths to Metals, Essays in Honour of George Eogan. Oxford: Oxbow.
- Bradley, J. Ireland's archaeology journals, Archaeology Ireland 18: 4; pp. 46–48 (2004)
- Bradley, J. With Märit Gaimster, Medieval Britain and Ireland in 2002, in Medieval Archaeology 47 pp. 199–339 (2003)
- Bradley, J. Ireland's archaeology journals, Archaeology Ireland 17: 4; pp. 36–7 (Winter 2003)
- Bradley, J. and Ben Murtagh, Brady's castle, Thomastown, Co. Kilkenny: a 14th-century fortified town house, in The medieval castle in Ireland and Wales, essays in honour of Jeremy Knight. J. R. Kenyon and Kieran O'Conor (eds). Four Courts, Dublin pp. 194–216 (2003)
- Bradley, J. Medieval towns, in Brian Lalor (ed) The encyclopaedia of Ireland (Dublin 2003)
- Bradley, J. Urban sovereigns and territorial sovereigns: the castle and town of Kilkenny 1200-1500, in Guido Helmig, Barbara Scholkmann and Matthias Untermann (eds) Medieval Europe, centre, region, periphery: proceedings of 3rd international conference of medieval and later archaeology, Basel (Switzerland) 10–15 September 2002 pp. 464–7. (Hertingen, 2002)
- Bradley, J. The rural house in medieval Ireland in Ruralia IV: the rural house from the migration period to the oldest still standing buildings. Jan Klápšte Institute of Archaeology, Academy of Sciences of the Czech Republic Prague pp 211–215 (2002)
- Bradley, J. From frontier town to renaissance city: Kilkenny 1500-1700, Proceedings of the British Academy, cviii, pp 29–51; also published separately as Peter Borsay and Lindsay Proudfoot (eds) Small towns in early modern Britain and Ireland, pp. 29–51. British Academy, London (2002)
- Bradley, J. With Märit Gaimster, Helen Geake and T. B. James, Medieval Britain and Ireland in 2001, Medieval Archaeology xlvi pp. 125–264. (2002)
- Bradley, J. A late Mesolithic settlement in eastern Ireland, in Recent developments in wetland archaeological research Barry Raftery and Joyce Hickey (eds). Dublin pp 299–306 (2001)
- Bradley, J. Archaeology, topography and building fabric: the cathedral and town of medieval Kildare, Journal of the Kildare Archaeological & Historical Society, 19: 1; pp. 27–47 (2000-1); reprinted in Raymond Gillespie (ed.), St Brigid's Cathedral, Kildare, a history. pp. 27–47. (Maynooth, 2001)
- Bradley, J. With Märit Gaimster, Medieval Britain and Ireland in 2000, Medieval Archaeology xlv, pp. 233–379 (2001)
- Bradley, J. Topographical development of Kilkenny, in Kilkenny, Irish Historic Towns Atlas no.10 John Bradley (ed), Royal Irish Academy pp. 1–9, (2000)
- Bradley, J. Archaeological excavations at Moynagh Lough, County Meath. Maynooth University Record pp. 31–37 (2000)
- Bradley, J. Kilkenny: the medieval town in the modern city, in John Bradley, Diarmuid Healy and Anne Murphy (eds), Themes in Kilkenny's history: the NUI Maynooth and Radio Kilkenny lectures (Red Lion Press, Callan), pp. 23–36 (2000)
- Bradley, J. Rural boroughs in medieval Ireland: nucleated or dispersed settlements? in Jan Klapste (ed.), Ruralia III. Památky archeologické—Supplementum 14, Institute of Archaeology, Prague, pp. 288–93 (2000)
- Bradley, J. With Märit Gaimster, Medieval Britain and Ireland in 1999, Medieval Archaeology xliv pp. 235–354 (2000)
- Bradley, J. Archaeology, topography and building fabric: the cathedral and town of medieval Kildare, Journal of the Kildare Archaeological and Historical Society xix pp. 27–47 (2000)
- Bradley, J. Urbanization in early medieval Ireland, in Spaces of the living and the dead: an archaeological dialogue (American Early Medieval Studies 3) C. E. Karkov, K. M. Wickham-Crowley and B. K. Young (eds). Oxford, Oxbow Books. pp. 133–147 (1999)
- Bradley, J. Early urban development in County Laois, in Laois history and society P. G. Lane and William Nolan (eds), Dublin pp. 257–282 (1999)
- Bradley, J. Excavations at Moynagh Lough, Co. Meath 1997-98 [7th interim report], Ríocht na Midhe x: 1; pp. 1–17 (1999)
- Bradley, J. Stirring the pot: Spenser, the View and earthen Ware, Spenser Newsletter 30: 2; (Spring-Summer 1999), pp. 29–30.
- Bradley, J. With Märit Gaimster and Cathy Haith, Medieval Britain and Ireland in 1998, Medieval Archaeology xliii, pp. 226–302 (1999)
- Bradley, J. The medieval boroughs of Dublin, in Conleth Manning (ed) Dublin and beyond the Pale: studies in honour of Patrick Healy. Wordwell, Bray pp. 129–144 (1998)
- Bradley, J. 'Carrickfergus’, ‘Fingal’, ‘Longphort’, ‘Urbanization’ (with David Dickson), ‘Vikings’, ‘Walled towns’, ‘Wood Quay’: entries in S. J. Connolly (ed), The Oxford companion to Irish history. Oxford University Press. (1998)
- Bradley, J. With Michael Potterton, Directory of information on archaeology in the Irish Parliament (Oireachtas Eireann), British and Irish archaeological bibliography 2 pp. 218–21. (1998)
- Bradley, J. With Märit Gaimster, Cathy Haith and T. B. Jones, Medieval Britain and Ireland in 1997, Medieval Archaeology xlii, pp. 107–90.
- Bradley, J. The monastic town of Clonmacnoise in Clonmacnoise studies 1: seminar papers 1994 H. A. King (ed) Duchas, Bray pp. 42–55 (1998)
- Bradley, J. Brú na Bóinne c.500-c.1600 AD in Brú na Bóinne, supplement to Archaeology Ireland xi: 3; pp. 32–33 (1997)
- Bradley, J. Archaeological excavations at Moynagh Lough, Co. Meath, 1995-96 [6th interim report], Ríocht na Midhe ix: 3, pp 50–61 (1997)
- Bradley, J. The tomb of Anastatia Tobyn at St Patrick's Churchyard, Kilkenny in John Kirwan (ed.) Kilkenny: studies in honour of Margaret M Phelan. Kilkenny Archaeological Society, pp 21–7 (1997).
- Bradley, J. Living at the water's edge: Moynagh Lough in the Bronze Age, in Archaeology Ireland, 10: 1; pp. 24–26, (1996)
- Bradley, J. Kilkenny: the faire citie, in Howard B. Clarke (ed) Irish cities. Thomas Davis Lectures, Mercier Press in association with Radio Telefís Eireann, Cork, pp. 150–62 (1995)
- Bradley, J. Excavations at Moynagh Lough 1988-1994 [5th interim report], Ríocht na Midhe ix: 1; pp. 158–69, (1994-5)
- Bradley, J. Scaninavian rural settlement in Ireland, in Archaeology Ireland, 9: 3; pp. 10–12 (1995)
- Bradley, J. Tralee, in John H. Andrews and Anngret Simms (eds) More Irish country towns. Thomas Davis Lectures, Mercier Press (Cork), pp 169–78 (1995)
- Bradley, J. Killaloe: a pre-Norman borough? Peritia viii, pp. 170–9. (1994)
- Bradley, J. The archaeology and history of St Patrick – a review article, North Munster Antiquarian Journal xxxv pp 29–44 (1993-4)
- Bradley, J. Moynagh Lough: an insular workshop of the second quarter of the eighth century, in R. Michael Spearman and John Higgitt (eds) The age of migrating ideas: early medieval art in northern Britain and Ireland. National Museums of Scotland & Sutton, pp. 74–81 (1993)
- Bradley, J. With A. Halpin, The topographical development of Scandinavian and Anglo-Norman Cork, in Patrick O’Flanagan and Cornelius Buttimer (eds) Cork: history and society. Geography Publications, Dublin. pp. 15–44 (1993)
- Bradley, J. With A. Halpin, The topographical development of Scandinavian and Anglo-Norman Waterford in W. Nolan and T. P. Power (eds) Waterford: history and society. Geography Publications, Dublin. pp. 105–129 (1992).
- Bradley, J. The topographical development of Scandinavian Dublin, in F. H. A. Aalen and K. Whelan (eds) Dublin city and county: from prehistory to the present: studies in honour of J.H. Andrews. Geography Publications, Dublin. pp 43–56 (1992)
- Bradley, J. Archaeology and development in Ireland's medieval cities and towns, in John Feehan (ed) Environment and development in Ireland. Environmental Institute, University College Dublin, pp. 81–6. (1992)
- Bradley, J and Heather King, Archaeological trial excavations in Kilkenny, Old Kilkenny Review 4: 4; 973–987, (1992)
- Bradley, J. Excavations at Moynagh Lough, Co. Meath, Journal of the Royal Society of Antiquaries of Ireland cxxi, pp. 5–26, (1991)
- Bradley, J. Excavations at Moynagh Lough, Co. Meath 1985 and 1987 [4th interim report], Ríocht na Midhe viii: 3; pp. 21–35, (1990-1)
- Bradley, J. With H. A. King, ‘Archaeological trial excavations at Bunratty, Co. Clare, North Munster Antiquarian Journal xxxiii, pp. 16–21, (1991)
