= Helen M. Roe =

Irish librarian and antiquary (1895–1988)

- Born: Helen Maybury Roe; 18 December 1895; County Laois, Ireland
- Died: 28 May 1988 (aged 92); Grove Nursing Home, Killiney, County Dublin, Ireland
- Education: Trinity College Dublin

Helen M. Roe (18 December 1895 – 28 May 1988), was an Irish librarian and antiquary, a champion of medieval Irish art and iconography.

== Early life and education ==
Born in 1895, Helen Maybury Roe was the daughter of William Ernest Roe and Anne Lambert Sheilds of Mountrath, Laois. Her grandfather was Francis Henry Sheilds of Parsonstown, owner of the King's County Chronicle. She was sent first to the local primary school and then to the Preston School in Abbeyleix. Although she attended Trinity College, Dublin, she didn't begin her career due to the outbreak of World War I. She joined the St John's Ambulance Brigade and served at the Cambridge Military Hospital and at Aldershot Barracks. In the immediate aftermath she continued her medical career with the Military Hospital in Bray, County Wicklow. She also spent time touring in Europe visiting museums and beginning her appreciation for medieval art. Roe had been raised Protestant and had done her duty as part of the aristocracy by serving in the war. But the soldiers had treated her as Irish and abused her especially during the Easter rising. The result was that Roe supported nationalism from then on. She went back to TCD and completed her degree in modern languages in 1921. She finally completed her M.A. in 1924 and began a teaching career. She spent time working in The Royal School, Dungannon, and Alexandra College, Dublin.

== Career ==
In 1926 her parents needed her and she returned home. In 1926, she became the County Librarian in Laois. While working as a librarian Roe was able to study further and, as a rare person with a car, she toured sites and visited schools. One result of her presentations to schools was to inspire Ireland’s first female archaeologist, Ellen Prendergast. In 1940 Roe retired from the library and moved to Dublin where she was able to buy a house and garden. Apart from her antiquarian work she was a regular supporter of charities and was honorary secretary of The Queen's County Protestant Orphan's Society and actively involved in The Dublin University Mission to Chota Nagpur, India.

Roe became a regular contributor to various journals and newspapers including Journal of the Royal Society of Antiquaries of Ireland, An Leabharlann, Béaloideas, Seanchas Ard Mhacha, Carloviana, the Irish Press and the Leinster Express. From 1965 until 1968 Roe served as the president of the Royal Society of Antiquaries of Ireland, first woman to be elected. She was elected to be a member of the Royal Irish Academy in 1984.

Roe was a member of Kilkenny Archaeological Society from 1959 to 1987 and an honorary life member since 1966. She gave several lectures and talks to the Society starting on 23 August 1953 with a talk about the high crosses of Ossory, with talks in the following years about the high crosses of Castledermot and Moone on 11 July 1954 and the high crosses of Graiguenamanagh and Ullard on 28 August 1955. Other talks were about Termonfeckin and surrounding country in May 1957 during a four-day outing of the Society and "Ireland's Golden Age" in October 1959. She published in the Society's annual journal Old Kilkenny Review up to 1983 (see bibliography).

Roe continued touring and lecturing into her nineties.

The RSAI have an annual lecture in her honour and have named one of their lecture rooms after her. A roundabout in Portlaoise is named after her.

== Bibliography ==
- The high crosses of Western Ossory, Kilkenny Archaeological Society 1958.
- The High Crosses. of Western Ossory, in: Old Kilkenny Review 1959, p. 18
- Medieval Fonts of Meath, Meath Archaeological and Historical Society, 1968, 128 pages.
- A Medieval Alabaster Figure, in: Old Kilkenny Review 1972, pp. 33-36.
- The high crosses of Kells, Meath Archaeological & Historical Society, 1975.
- The cult of St. Michael in Ireland, In: C. Ó Danachair (ed.) Folk and Farm. Royal Society of Antiquaries of Ireland, Dublin. 1976
- Instruments of the Passion, in: Old Kilkenny Review 1983, pp. 527-534.

== External resources ==
- Rory O’Farrell and Christine Bromwich, "Helen M. Roe (1895-1988)" in Jane Chance (ed.), Women Medievalists and the Academy (Madison, WI: University of Wisconsin Press, 2005), 461.
- Andrew O’Brien, "Roe, Helen Maybury," in James McGuire and James Quinn (eds.), Dictionary of Irish Biography (Cambridge: Cambridge University Press, 2009).
- "Official Opening of the Helen Roe Theatre 21 January 1993", The Journal of the Royal Society of Antiquaries of Ireland 122 (1992), 155
- A collection of Helen Maybury Roe’s papers from this period are held in the Laois County Archives.
- "Obituary: Ellen M. Prendergast", The Irish Times, 24 May 1999.
- A partial bibliography of Helen Roe’s writings can be found at RI-Opac.
- Helen M. Roe, "The "David Cycle" in Early Irish Art", The Journal of the Royal Society of Antiquaries of Ireland 79:1/2 (1949), 39-59.
- Helen M. Roe, "Some Aspects of Medieval Culture in Ireland", The Journal of the Royal Society of Antiquaries of Ireland 96:2 (1966), 105-09.
- H.A.K., "Helen Maybury Roe", Archaeology Ireland 2:3 (1988), 86; O’Farrell and Bromwich, "Roe", 465.
