= Margaret Phelan =

President of the Kilkenny Archaeological Society

- Born: Margaret Mary Duggan; 22 December 1902; Kilkenny, Ireland
- Died: 24 February 2000 (aged 97); Kilkenny, Ireland

Margaret Phelan (née Duggan, 22 December 1902 – 24 February 2000) was President of the Kilkenny Archaeological Society, given freedom of the city of Kilkenny and ensured the restoration of Rothe House in Kilkenny. She was also the first Ladies president of the Kilkenny Golf Club.

== Early life ==
Born Margaret Mary Duggan, known as Daisy, on 22 December 1902 to Richard Duggan in William St, Kilkenny. Her father was a prosperous Kilkenny merchant who owned and ran the Monster House, a major department store in the city. Her mother was Richard Duggan's second wife, Henrietta Fitzgibbon of Castlerea and Phelan was her mother's eldest daughter. She had two sisters, Nin and Eva and two brothers Jack and Paddy who were from that marriage and three half-brothers Peter, Tommy and Dick.

She went both to the Loreto Convent, Kilkenny, and Our Lady's Bower in Athlone, before going to University College Cork where she graduated with a Bachelor of Arts and Commerce in 1923. She met her husband on an archaeological day at the Rock of Cashel and they were married in 1925. He was William Phelan the Kilkenny County Surgeon. They had daughters Ellen, Peggy, Breda and Hendy and one son, Bill.

== Historical impact ==
With friends, in 1945, she decided to reform the Kilkenny Archaeological Society which had originally been started in the city in 1849. The Society developed into the Royal Society of Antiquaries of Ireland and moved to Dublin leaving Kilkenny without such a group. Phelan was aware of the losses the city had suffered in buildings which were destroyed or fell down during the time when there was no focus group to protect them. As a result, she ensured the new KAS was involved in the old buildings in the city. In 1962, she ensured the Kilkenny Archaeological Society bought Rothe House which needed renovation and restoration. It is now a major attraction in the city and houses a permanent museum. The restoration of this building led to the protection and restoration of many other major architectural buildings in Kilkenny and directly impacted tourism.

Her focus on history was not confined to recovering important buildings. Phelan was a regular and major contributor to the Old Kilkenny Review. She made notes of all the inscriptions in the city's graveyards. She wrote several major historical studies which gained national recognition.

== Other activities ==
Phelan was a sportswoman who played hockey for Munster while she was in college. In 1931 she was Lady Captain of the Golf club in Kilkenny and became the first Ladies president in 1993. She was a regular bridge player.

== Appreciation ==
In recognition of the impact her continuing work had on Kilkenny, in 1987 Phelan was awarded the freedom of the city. One of the rooms in Rothe house was named after her.

When she died Kilkenny gave her a ceremonial civic funeral with Sergeants-at-arms carrying the sword and mace while the mayor and corporation wore their robes and chains of office.
