= Carlow County Museum =

- Músaem Chontae Cheatharlach
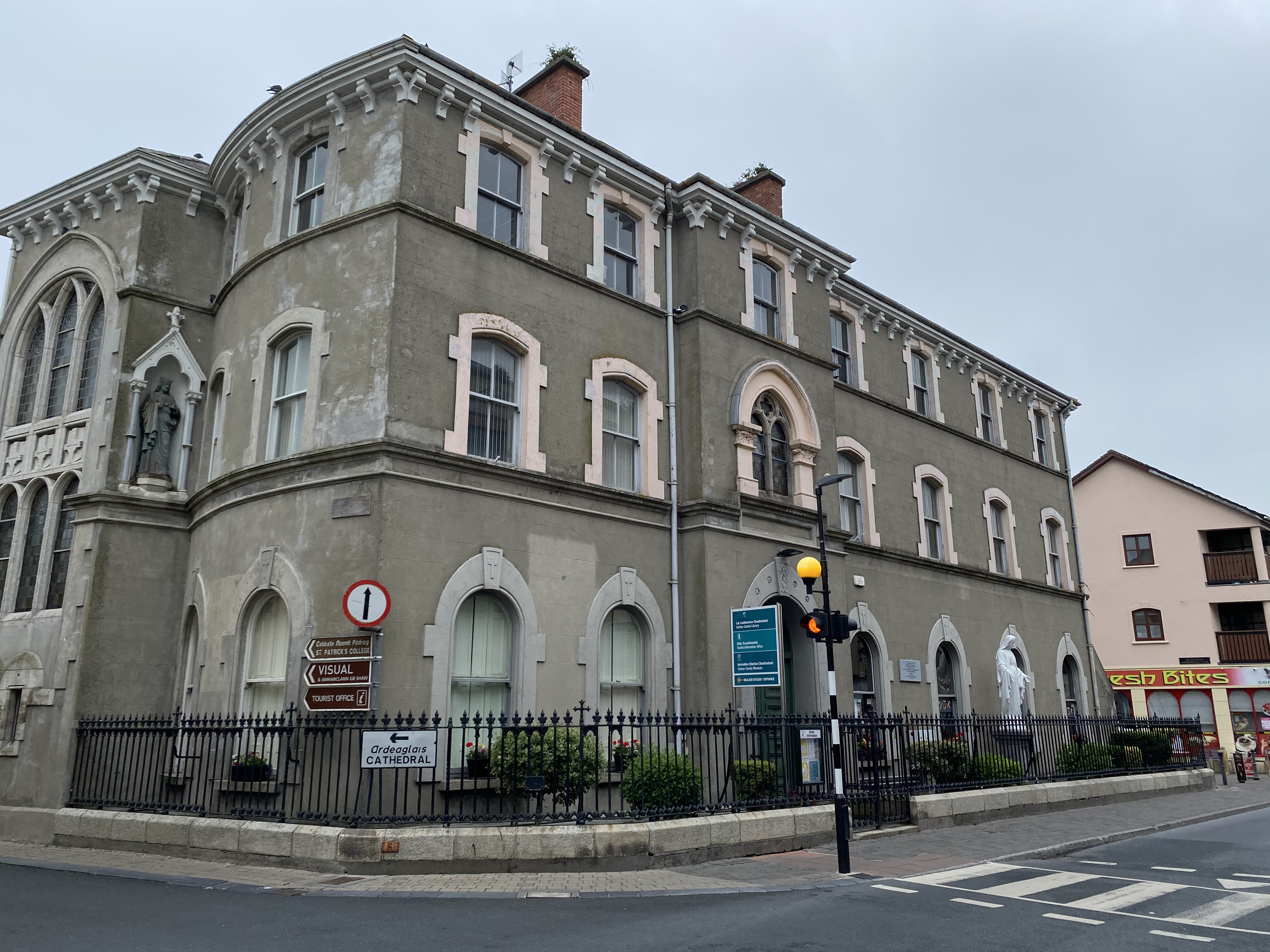

- Location within Ireland
- Established: 1973
- Location: Carlow, Ireland
- Coordinates: 52.836238°N 6.928174°W
- Type: County museum
- Visitors: 26,000 per annum (2019)
- Curator: Dermot Mulligan
- Website: www.carlowmuseum.ie

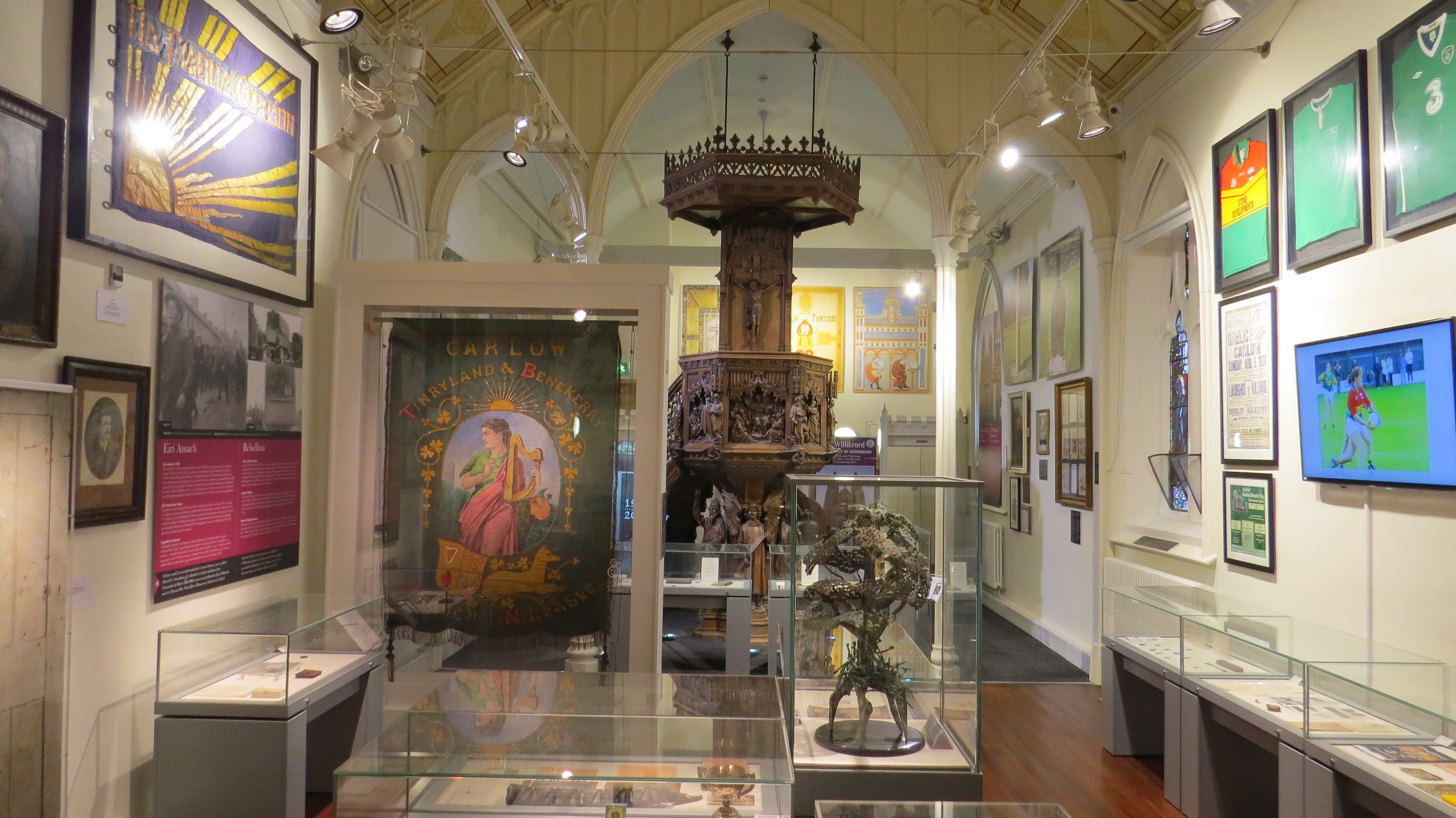
First floor gallery

Carlow County Museum (Irish: Músaem Chontae Cheatharlach) is a museum documenting the history of County Carlow. Located on College Street in Carlow town, the building was originally the Presentation Convent; it also houses the County Library and Archives.

== History ==
The museum was founded by the Carlow Historical & Archaeological Society (CHAS), then the Old Carlow Society, in 1973, and was run by the society on a voluntary basis until 2002. The collections were housed first in the old Christian Brothers' building, and latterly the former theatre room of Carlow Town Hall from 1979. The museum was opened afresh in the redeveloped convent building in 2012, the last of the buildings to open in a new cultural quarter. It is now operated by Carlow Town Council and Carlow County Council in association with the CHAS.

== Exhibits ==
The museum consists of four exhibition rooms, housing permanent and temporary displays. Its collection includes objects that cover the archaeological, history, social history and folk life of the local area. It is designated to collect archaeological finds by the National Museum of Ireland. One of the most notable objects on display is the 19th century pulpit from Carlow Cathedral which was included in The Irish Times "A History of Ireland in 100 Objects". Other objects in the Museum's collections pertain to John Tyndall, Kevin Barry, Captain Myles Kehoe, and the Carlow Sugar Factory.

The museum unveiled an installation as part of the "Ireland 2016 Centenary Programme", the Carlow 1916 Commemorative Stained Glass Panel by Peadar Lamb, depicts a Carlow narrative on the 1916 Rising, featuring some of the key Carlow figures and the role they played in 1916.

There was a special exhibition about St. Willibrord titled: Saint Willibrord, Patron Saint of Luxembourg and his County Carlow Connection.

Later exhibits include the grave effigy of Robert Hartpole, Constable of Carlow Castle and High Sheriff of Carlow, dating from 1594.

== See also ==
- List of country houses in County Carlow
- Oak Park, County Carlow
