= Meath Archaeological and Historical Society =

The Meath Archaeological and Historical Society is a local historical society in County Meath. It is best known for its annual periodical of essays on Meath history called 'Ríocht na Midhe' (Irish language (Gaeilge):'The Kingdom of Meath'). Their field of work covers the area of the ancient Kingdom of Meath, which roughly corresponds to the current religious diocese of Meath.

== History ==
The society was established in 1937, but lapsed to a degree during the Second World War due to the rationing of materials such as paper and petrol which made the travelling, correspondence and publishing necessary for the society's activities difficult. However the society reformed afterwards and publication of its signature publication, 'Ríocht na Midhe', began in 1955.

== Current activities ==
As well as coordinating and publishing 'Ríocht na Midhe', the society also organises lectures on local historical topics in Meath, and excursions to sites of historical and archaeological interest in the area. Society membership entitles members to attend the society's activities and to receive a copy of 'Ríocht na Midhe'.

== See also ==
- List of historical societies in Ireland
