= Hugh de Rous =

Hugh de Rous or Hugh Rufus (Latinised) was the first "English", i.e. Norman Bishop of Ossory. He held the see between 1202 and 1218. He was successor to Felix Ua Duib Sláin.

His granting the land between Cott(e)rell's Bridge and St. Kieran's Well to William Marshal around 1207 was instrumental in the growth and prosperity of Kilkenny.
