= Carlow Historical & Archaeological Society =

Historical society in Ireland

Carlow Historical & Archaeological Society (formerly The Old Carlow Society) is a historical society in Co. Carlow, Ireland, founded in 1946. Donal McCartney, Professor Emeritus of Modern Irish History, University College Dublin is the current president of the society. The Society organises Lectures on local history and exhibitions, and has also erected plaques on buildings historical interest in County Carlow, such as at Milford Mills, and Carlow Railway stations.

== Founding ==
The Society was founded in 1946 as The Old Carlow Society. The society’s first chairman was Fr. William Miller, then administrator of the Carlow Cathedral parish and long time member of the Kildare Archaeological Society. The first secretary was Liam D. Bergin, who was then editor of The Nationalist and Leinster Times, and Rev. P. J. Brophy of St. Patrick's, Carlow College.

== Carlow County Museum ==
The Society was instrumental in the setting up of the Carlow County Museum, and its members were involved in its running on a voluntary basis up until 2002. The museum is now operated by Carlow Town council in association with the Society.

== The Carloviana ==
The Society publishes an annual journal The Carloviana. Fr. P. J. Brophy was its first editor. Its first edition was published in 1947, and every year since except for 1952 and 1982 (two were published in 1983). It has also been edited by Liam Bergin, Aidan Murray, W. V. Haden, M.T. Kelly, E.F. Brophy, Edward McParland, Hugh Dolan, Thomas MacGabhann, Rev. Dermot McKenna, and Martin Nevin.

== See also ==
- List of historical societies in Ireland
