= Rothe House =

16th-century merchant's townhouse complex

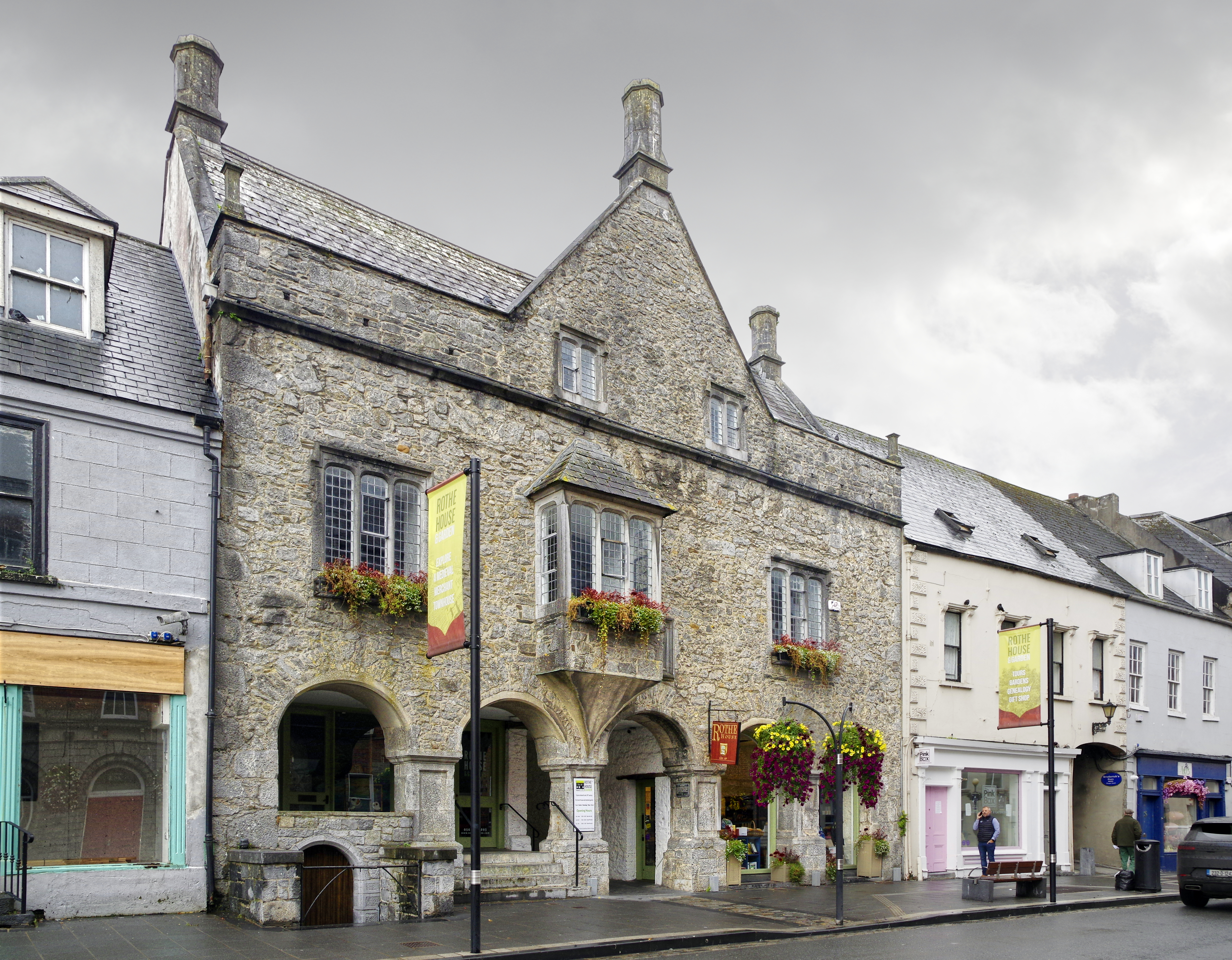

General information
- Type: Merchant townhouse
- Architectural style: English Renaissance style
- Location: Parliament Street, Kilkenny, Ireland
- Coordinates: 52.654295°N 07.2546323°W
- Construction started: 1594
- Completed: 1610
- Owner: Kilkenny Archaeological Society

Website
- http://www.rothehouse.com/

Rothe House /ˈroʊθ/ is a late 16th-century merchant's townhouse complex located in the city of Kilkenny, Ireland. The complex was built by John Rothe Fitz-Piers between 1594 and 1610 and is made up of three houses, three enclosed courtyards, and a large reconstructed garden with orchard. As a museum, it is accessible to the public.

Rothe House is the only remaining example of a complete burgage plot in Ireland, and considered to be nationally significant because of the range of original post-medieval features that survive. The property, an important element of Kilkenny's heritage, is owned by the Kilkenny Archaeological Society and houses some of the society's collection of artefacts relating to Kilkenny City, County and Ireland.

The garden to the rear of the house has been reconstructed to reflect a typical 17th-century garden. It features a well dug by Cistercian monks (based in Duiske Abbey in Graiguenamagh) who owned the property before the dissolution of monasteries. The burgage plot on which Rothe House was built survives intact – one of a few in such an unaltered state. Kilkenny's medieval city wall forms part of the curtilage of the Rothe House complex.

== History ==
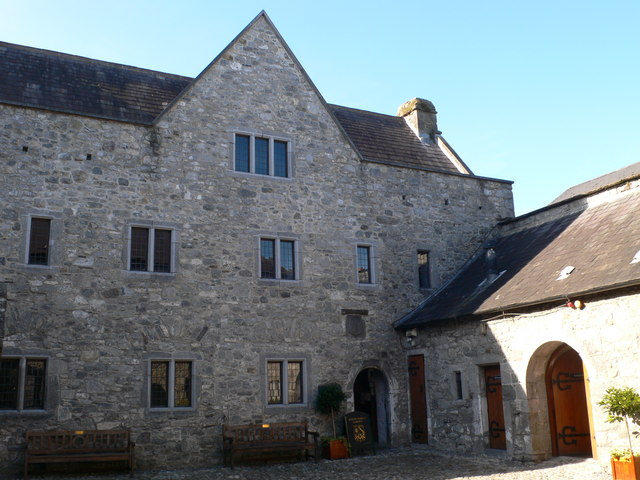
Courtyard and third house in the complex

The Rothe family were merchants foremost, but also involved in politics. They were part of an oligarchy of around ten families who controlled Kilkenny throughout the 15th and 16th centuries, and into the 17th century. Rothe House was constructed on a burgage plot John Rothe Fitz Piers acquired. All three houses are dated, the first at 1594 on John Rothe's coat-of-arms next to the oriel window, the second at 1604 in an inscription on the cistern once connected to the second house and the third at 1610 on the Rothe-Archer coat-of-arms above its entrance door.

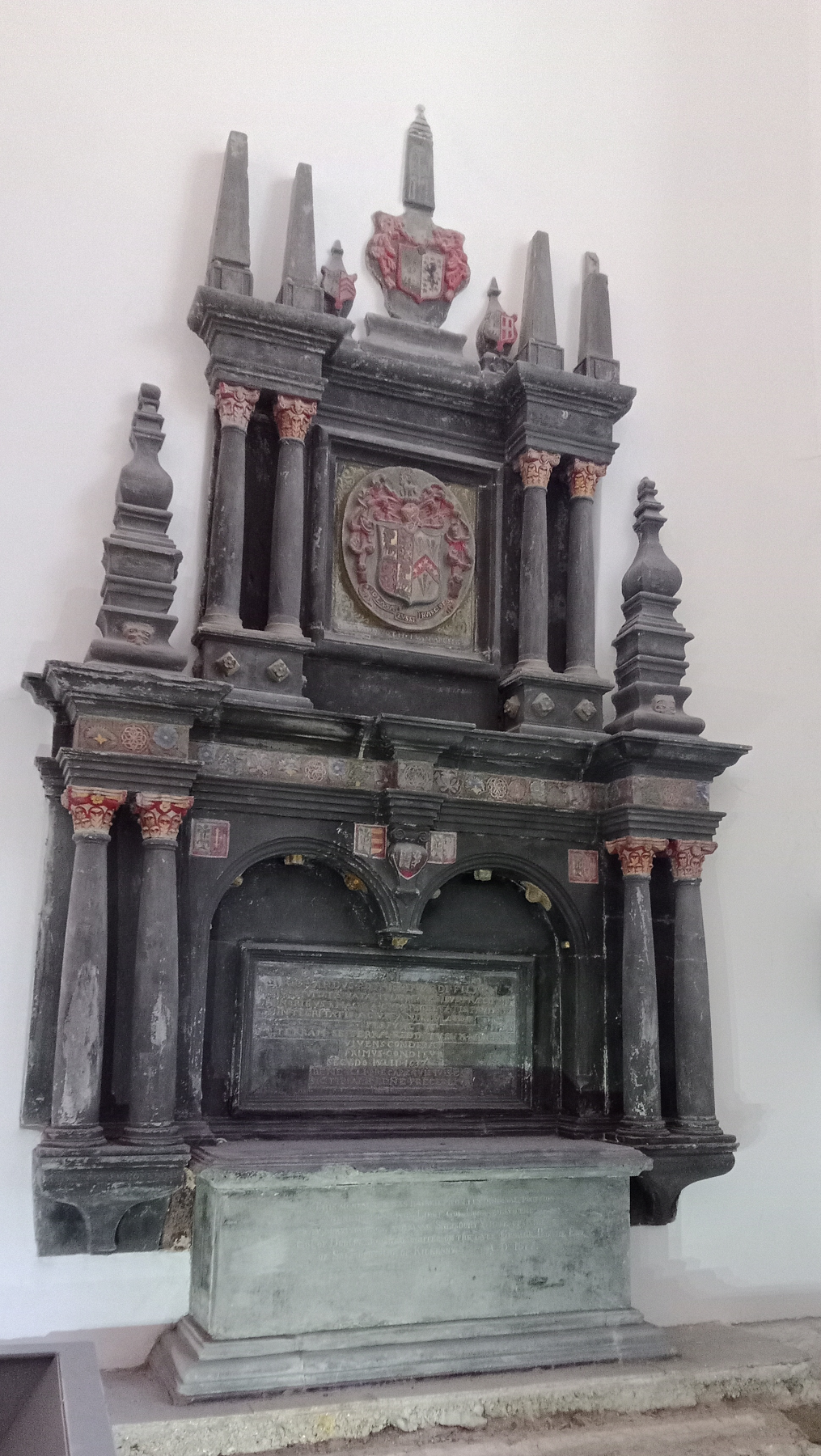
Rothe family tomb

John Rothe is buried at the former St. Mary's Church in a tomb he provided for in his 1619 will.

The house was confiscated after Charles I's defeat in England, due to the family's involvement in the confederation of Kilkenny. It is believed that the Ecclesiastical Assembly, one of the three bodies forming the confederation, met at Rothe House. Following the restoration of Charles II, the house was given back to the Rothe family, but they lost it again after the Battle of the Boyne. It changed ownership several times, before it was finally purchased by Kilkenny Archaeological Society in 1962.

For over 100 years (until 2015), the second house served the Gaelic League as a meeting venue, where Thomas MacDonagh taught Irish history. One of the rooms is now named in honour of him, whereas most of the other rooms are named after former (mostly female) members of Kilkenny Archaeological Society.

== Architecture ==
Rothe House is an example of a house owned by Kilkenny's merchant class. It was built in the English Renaissance style which was introduced to the south-east of Ireland by Thomas Butler, 10th Earl of Ormond, in the 1560s.

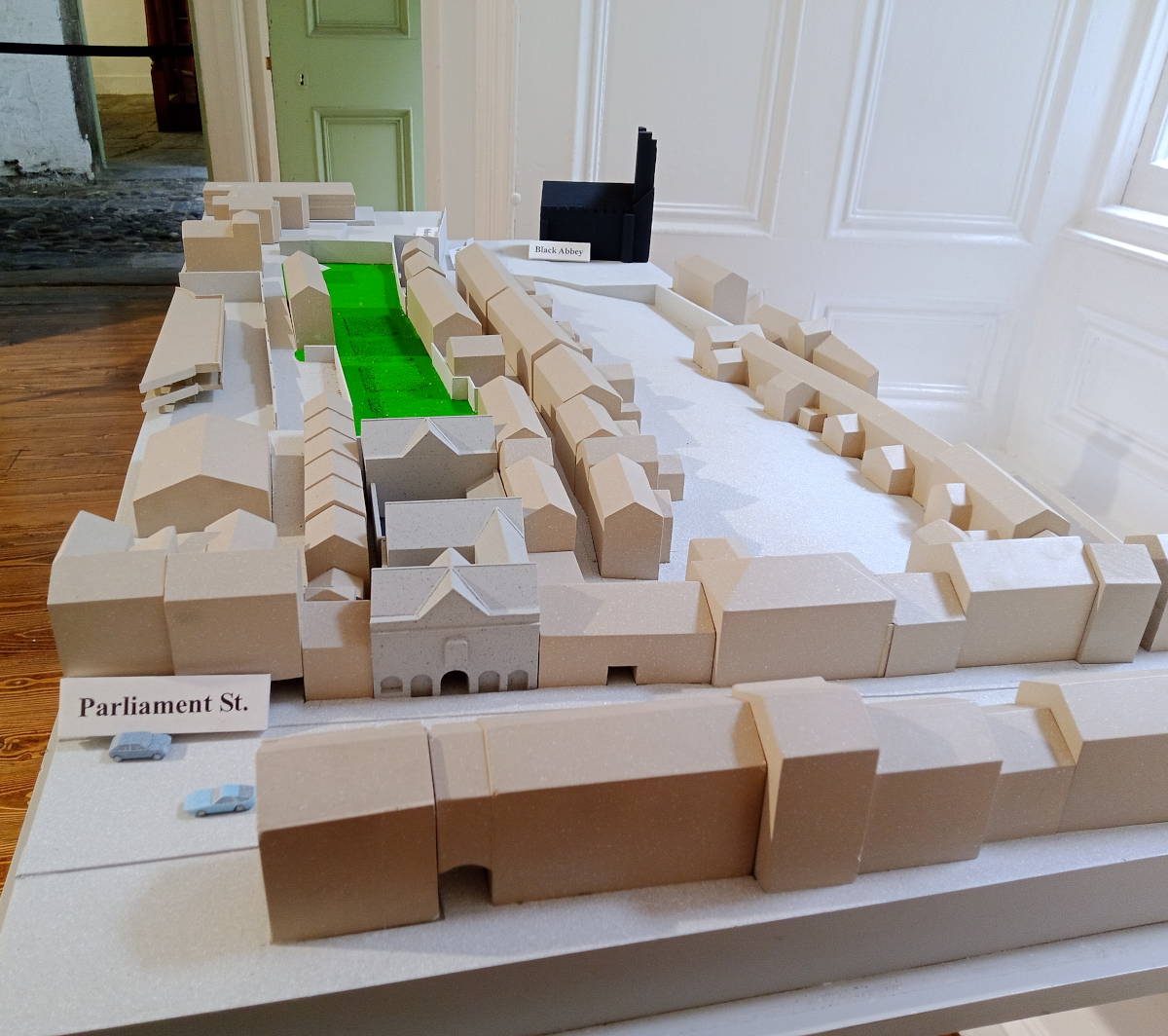
Architectural model of the Rothe House and surrounding buildings

The configuration of the original consecutive building sequence of John Rothe's three houses (dating respectively to 1594, 1604 and 1610) has survived intact. Rothe's sequential building programme is significant, as he deliberately built three independent houses rather than extending the first house to accommodate the needs of his growing family. In this, he followed the pattern of development chosen by his wife's family (the Archers) in their arrangement of the Archer house and the house built behind it, now known as 'The Hole in the Wall' (off High Street).

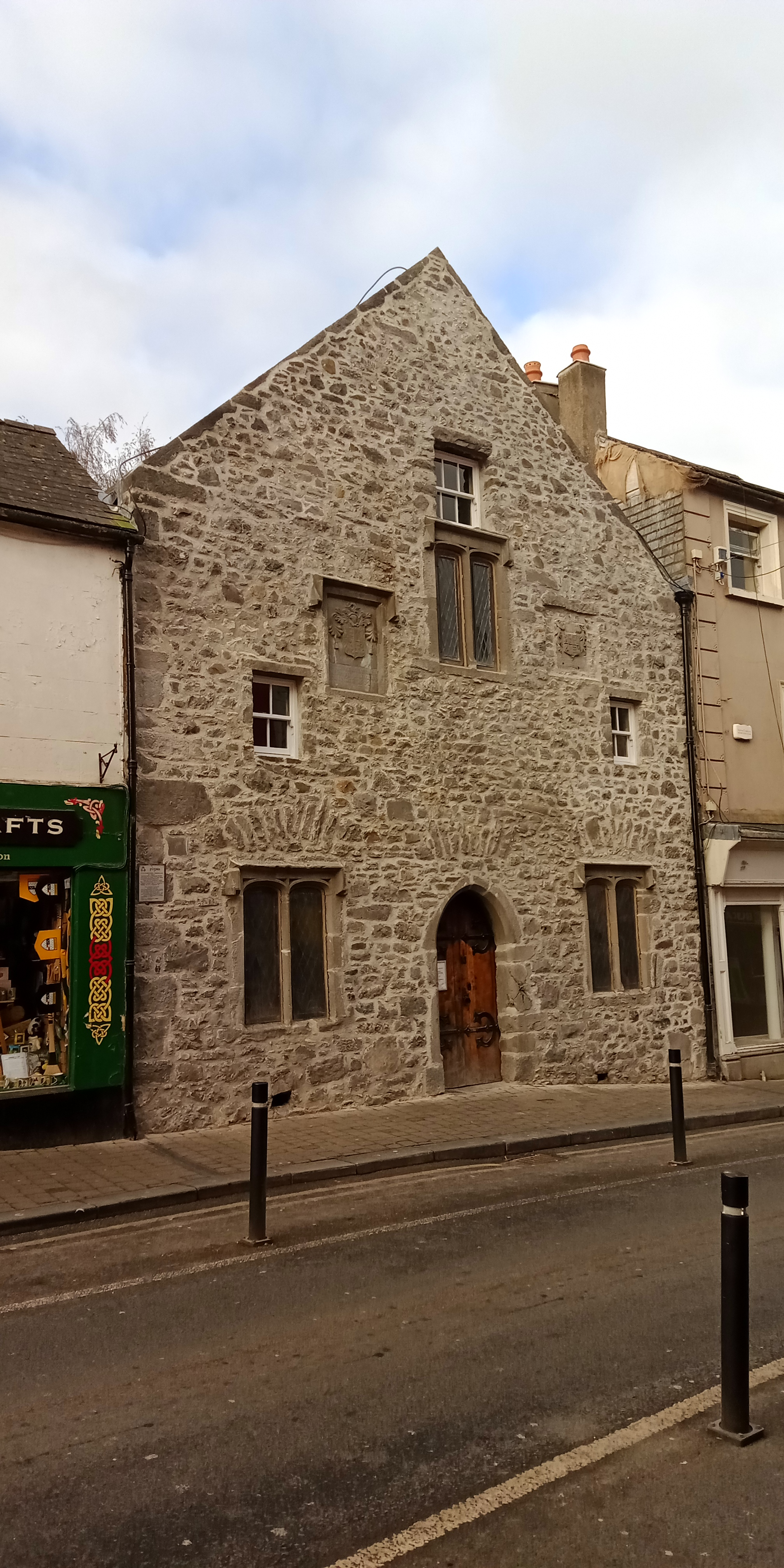
Shee Alms House

Houses in Kilkenny which survive from the same period as Rothe House are: 'The Hole in the Wall', High Street, built 1582-4 by the Archer family; Shee Alms House, Rose Inn Street built 1582 by the Shee family; The Bridge House, John Street built around the late 16th century which survives in part; Kyteler's Inn, St. Kieran's Street built 1473–1702 by the Kyteler family; also Deanery, Coach Road in 1614 and 21 Parliament Street which was built in the late 16th/17th century and survives in part.

== Statutory status ==
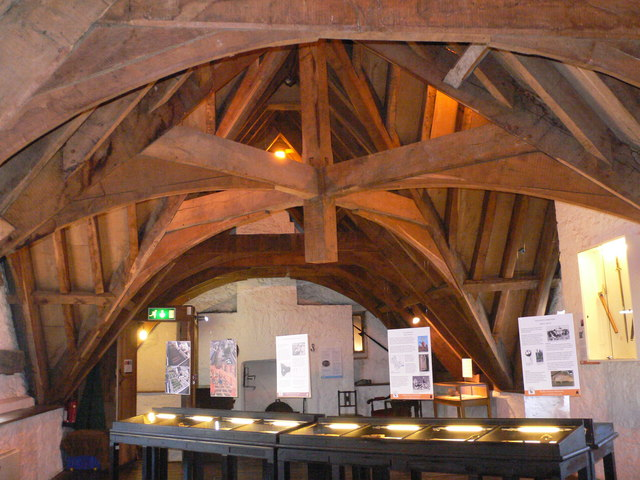
Roof beams within Rothe House

Rothe House is listed as an element of the urban area of Kilkenny City in the Record of Monuments and Places, where it is listed in the Area of Archaeological Importance in the Urban Archaeological Survey County Kilkenny. It also is a nationally significant structure from the Planning Authority Development Plan under List 1 of the Kilkenny City and Environs Development Plan, 1994 and it is listed as being of national importance in the National Inventory of Architectural Heritage survey of Kilkenny.

== Museum ==
The museum at Rothe House contains a number of archaeological and historical artefacts, most of which were found locally or donated by citizens of Kilkenny to the Kilkenny Archaeological Society.
