= County Kildare Archaeological Society =

Archaeological Society in County Kildare, Ireland

The County Kildare Archaeological Society is a historical and archaeological society in County Kildare in Ireland. The society's original stated aim was "the promotion of the study and knowledge of the antiquities and objects of interest in the county and surrounding districts."

It was founded in 1891 in a meeting at Palmerstown House, Straffan, which was at that time the home of the Earl of Mayo; it claims to be the oldest society in Ireland to have continued under the same name.

== See also ==
- List of historical societies in Ireland
