= John G. A. Prim =

Irish journalist, newspaper editor, antiquary and archaeologist

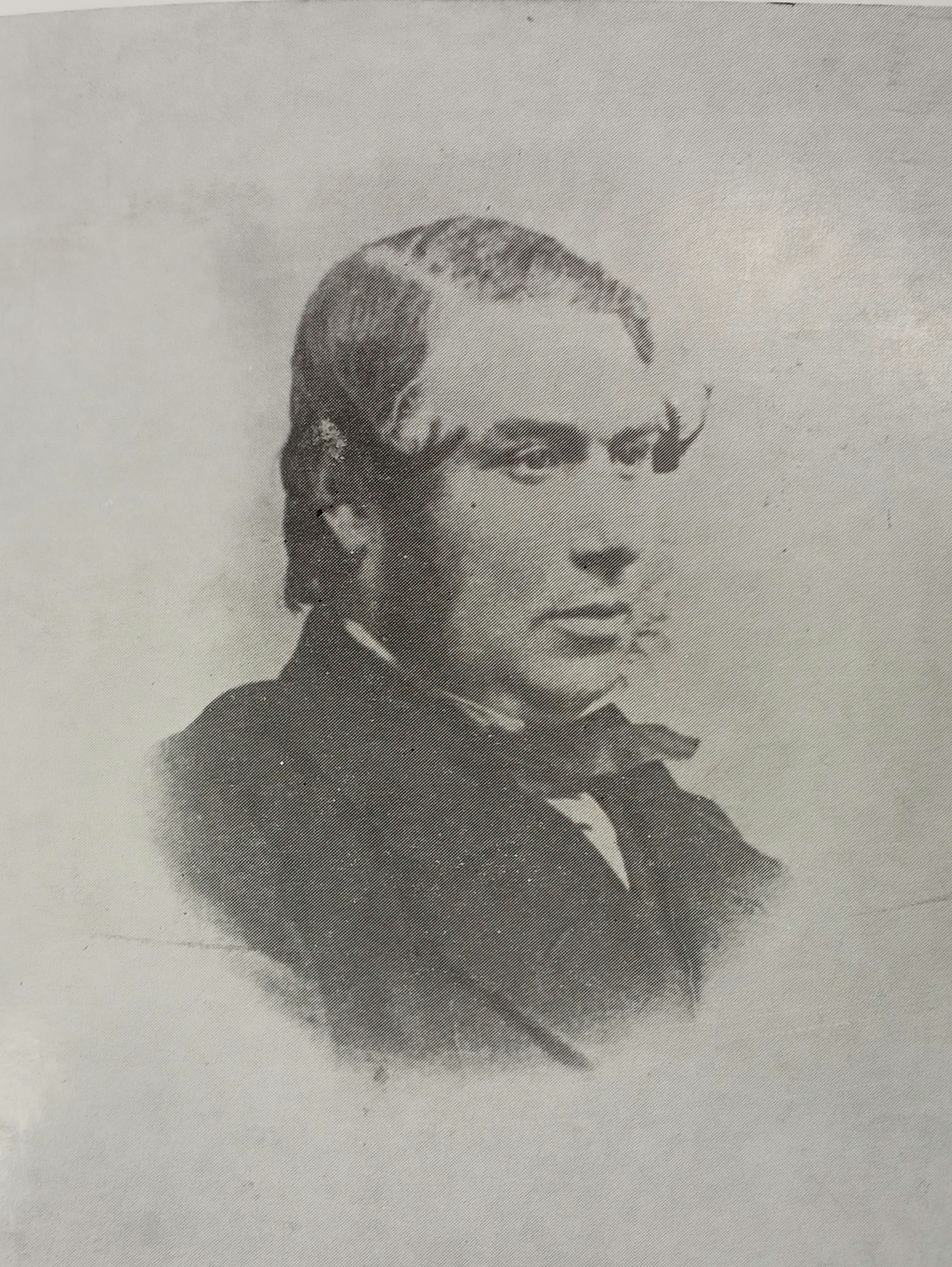
- Born: 1821; Kilkenny, Ireland
- Died: 2 November 1875
- Occupations: editor, antiquary and archaeologist
- Employer: Kilkenny Moderator
- Organization: Royal Society of Antiquaries of Ireland
- Known for: antiquary/author
- Notable work: "Nooks and Corners of County Kilkenny". "The History, Architecture and Antiquities of the Cathedral Church of St Canice, Kilkenny"
- Relatives: James Graves; Kyran T. Buggy

John George Augustus Prim (1821–1875) was an Irish journalist, newspaper editor, antiquary and archaeologist of the Victorian era.

== Life ==
Prim was born in the city of Kilkenny to John Henry Prim, a lawyer and Johanna Anderson. He had three brothers and four sisters. Prim had eight children with Mary McCrea, the daughter of the founder of the Moderator, Abraham Denroche. He was a reporter at the Kilkenny Moderator, and editor from 1855 to the end of his life. Since childhood he had a fascination with archeology and wrote accounts of the archaeological sites throughout County Kilkenny.

PrimHe planned to write the history of the county. He had begun transcribing from medieval manuscripts, collecting Irish ballads, and also planned to publish the songs of the county. Prim had a relationship with Seán Ó Dálaigh and Séamus Ó Braonáin to collect songs in Irish in their areas.

== Kilkenny Archaeological Society ==
The Royal Society of Antiquaries of Ireland was founded in 1849 as the Kilkenny Archaeological Society, by a group of young men with archaeological and historical interests who were based in the Kilkenny area. Prim and his cousin, James Graves, were the first two Honorary General Secretaries. They had had an interest in Kilkenny antiquities from their youngest days, when they had rambled as far afield as Kilfane Church to see the famous tomb sculpture of Cantwell Fada.

Prim had begun transcribing from medieval manuscripts, while Graves had been making sketches of the ancient monasteries of the vicinity. In 1869 the society was granted a Royal Charter, and in 1890 it moved to Dublin, changing its name to the Royal Society of Antiquaries of Ireland, becoming in 1891, according to its Honorary Secretary Robert Cochrane, "not only the largest Antiquarian Society in Great Britain and Ireland, but also the largest in the world".

== Works ==
The Department of Irish Folklore, University College Dublin, have his manuscripts and notes prepared for the history of County Kilkenny, and the papers relating to the history and genealogies of the old Kilkenny families. The songs he collected in Irish have been published by Dáithí Ó hÓgáin. Forty-five of his essays were published in the society's magazine.

- Anderson, Paris; Prim, John G. A. (1848), Nooks and Corners of County Kilkenny., Kilkenny: Kilkenny People Printing Works, ISBN 9781413152036, OCLC 969858645 by John G.A. Prim; formerly attributed to Paris Anderson
- Prim, John G. A. (1849). "OBSERVATIONS ON SEDILIA in Irish Churches". Transactions of the Kilkenny Archaeological Society. 1 (1): 51–58.
- Prim, John G. A. (1849). "Ancient Flemish Colony in Kilkenny". Transactions of the Kilkenny Archaeological Society. 1 (1): 37–40.
- Prim, John G. A. (1849). "Reply to Mr. Cooke's Objections to the Sedilia Theory". Transactions of the Kilkenny Archaeological Society. 1 (1): 75–83.
- Prim, John G. A. (1851). "On the Discovery of Ancient Sepulchral Monuments at the Dominican Abbey, Kilkenny". Transactions of the Kilkenny Archaeological Society. 1 (3): 453–462.
- Prim, John G. A. (1852). "Notes on the Excavation of a Rath at Dunbel, County of Kilkenny". Transactions of the Kilkenny Archaeological Society. 2 (1): 119–127.
- Prim, John G. A. (1855). "On the Discovery of Ogham Monuments and Other Antiquities in the Raths of Dunbel, County of Kilkenny". Proceedings and Transactions of the Kilkenny and South-East of Ireland Archaeological Society. 3 (2): 397–408.
- Graves, James; Prim, John G. Augustus (1857). The history, architecture, and antiquities of the cathedral church of St. Canice, Kilkenny. Grafton Street, Dublin: Hodges, Smith, & Co.
- Prim, John G. A. (1870). "The Corporation Insignia and Olden Civic State of Kilkenny". The Journal of the Royal Historical and Archaeological Association of Ireland. 1 (1): 280–305.
- Ó hÓgáin, Dáithí (1981). Duanaire Osraíoch. Baile Atha Cliath. ISBN 978-1-906883-35-5.
- Ó hÓgáin, Dáithí (1981). Duanaire Thiobraid Árann. ISBN 978-1-906883-38-6.
