= List of historical societies in Ireland =

The following is a list of historical societies in Ireland.

== Organizations ==
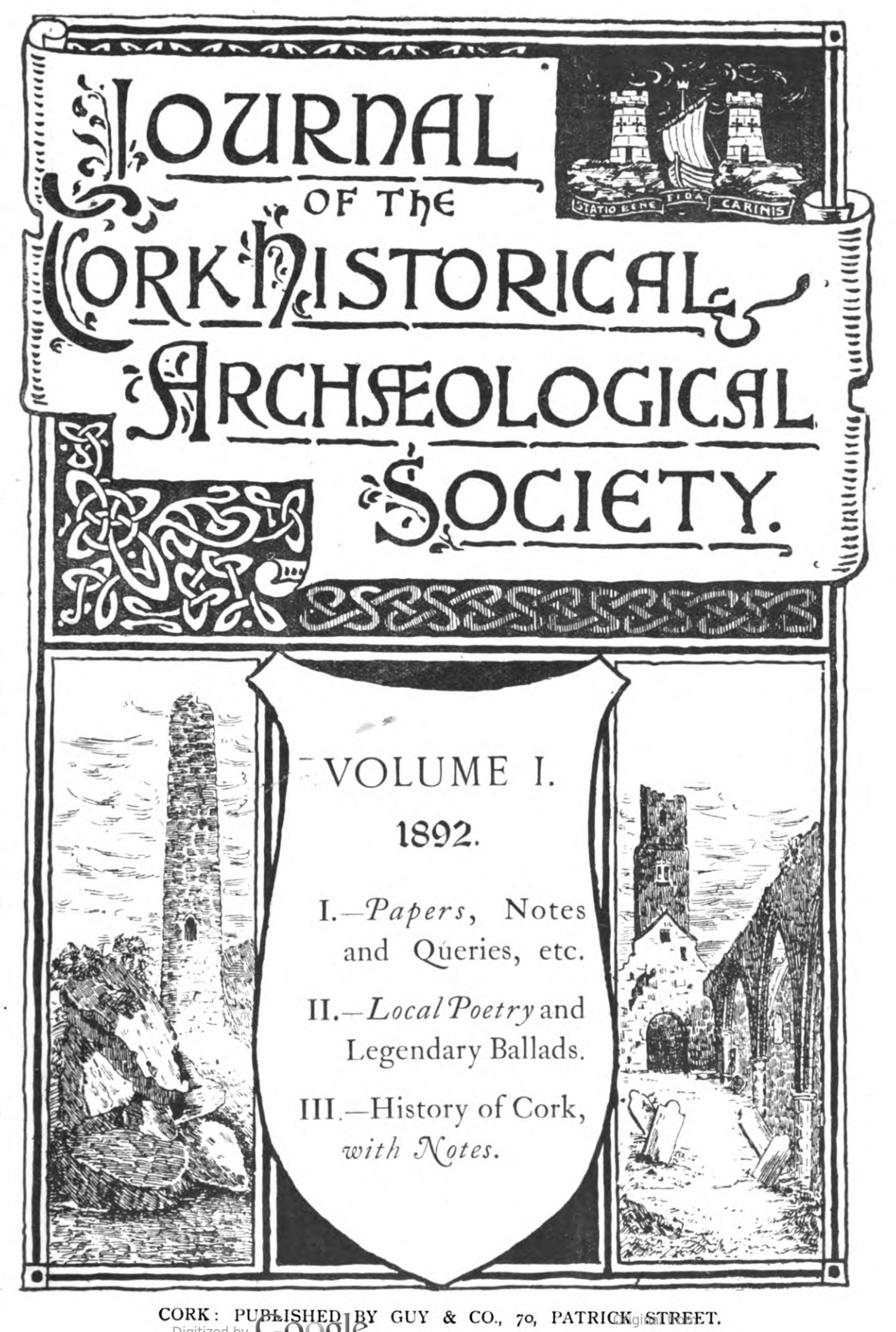
Journal of the Cork Historical and Archaeological Society, 1892

- Achill Historical & Archaeological Society
- Annagassan & District Historical Society
- Ards Historical Society, in Newtownards
- Ashbourne Historical Society
- Athy Museum Society
- Aubane Historical Society
- Ballincollig Heritage Association
- Ballinrobe Archaeological and Historical Society
- Ballsbridge, Donneybrook & Sandymount Historical Society
- Ballygarvan & District Local History Society
- Ballymore Eustace History Society
- Ballymote Heritage Group
- Bannow Historical Society
- Beara Historical Society
- Birr Historical Society
- Blackpool Historical Society
- Blanchardstown Castleknock History Society
- Blarney & District Historical Society
- Blessington History Society
- Borrisoleigh Historical Society
- Bray Cualann History Society
- Breifne Historical Society
- Cahir Historical & Social Society
- Canovee Historical Society
- Carlow Historical & Archaeological Society
- Carrick on Shannon & District Historical Society
- Carrigtwohill & District Historical Society
- Castleconnell Historical Society
- Castleisland & District Culture & Heritage Society
- Celbridge Historical Society
- Cill Dara Historical Society
- Clane Local History Group
- Clare Archaeological & Historical Society
- Claregalway Historical Society
- Clondalkin History Society
- Clonmel Historical Society
- Clontarf Historical Society
- Cloyne Literary & Historical Society
- Coachford Historical Society
- Conahy Heritage Society
- Cork Historical & Archaeological Society
- Cork South Parish Historical Society
- County Donegal Historical Society
- Old Drogheda Society
- Old Dublin Society
- Duchas Tullaherin Heritage Society
- Dun Bleisce Historical & Literary Society
- Dun Laoghaire Burrough Historical Society
- Old Dundalk Society
- Dundalk Railway Heritage Society
- Dunleer & District Historical Society
- Dunmanway Historical Society
- Edenderry Historical Society
- Fassadinin History Society
- Fehard Historical Society
- Fohenagh & District Historical Society
- Foxrock History Club
- Old Galway Society
- Galway Archaeological & Historical Society
- Glanmire Heritage Society
- Glens of Antrim Historical Society
- Glin Historical Society
- Graiguenamanagh Historical Society
- Great Island Historical Society (Cobh)
- Greystones Archaeological & Historical Society
- Howth Peninsula Heritage Society
- Ibane Local Studies Society
- Industrial Heritage Association of Ireland
- Irish Family History Society
- Irish Historical Society
- Irish Labour History Society
- Irish Palatine Association
- Kerry Archaeological & Historical Society
- Kilbarron-Terryglass Historical Society
- County Kildare Archaeological Society
- Kilkenny Archaeological Society
- Kill Local History Group
- Kilmacud Stillorgan Local History Society
- Kilmeen & Castleventry Historical Society
- Kilrush & District Historical Society
- Kilshannig Heritage Society
- Kiltartan Gregory Cultural Society
- Kinsale Historical Society
- Knockfierna Heritage Society
- Knocklyon History Society
- Laois Heritage Society
- Limerick Historical Society
- County Longford Historical Society
- Lough Gur Historical Society
- Loughshinny & Rush Historical Society
- County Louth Archaeological & Historical Society
- Maynooth Local History Group
- Mayo Historical and Archaeological Society
- Mayo North Heritage & Research Centre
- Meath Archaeological & Historical Society
- Moate Historical Society
- Monasterevin Historical Society
- Mount Merrion Historical Society, in Dublin
- Mungret Heritage Society
- Naas Local History Group
- Navan & District Historical Society
- Newbridge Local History Group
- North Clare Historical Society
- North Mayo-West Sligo Heritage Group
- North Wexford Historical Society
- Offaly Historical & Archaeological Society
- Ormonde Historical Society
- Presbyterian History Society of Ireland
- Raheny Heritage Society
- Rathcoffey Historical Society
- Rathcoole Heritage Society
- Rathdangan Historical Society
- Rathfarnham Historical Society
- Rathfeigh Historical Society
- Rathmichael Historical Society
- County Roscommon Historical & Archaeological Society
- Roundwood & District Historical & Folklore Society
- Royal Society of Antiquaries of Ireland
- Shannon Archaeological and Historical Society
- Skerries Historical Society
- Skibbereen & District Historical Society
- Slane History & Archaeological Society
- South Kilkenny Historical Society
- South-East Galway Archaeological & Historical Society
- St Ultan’s Bohermeen Historical Society
- St. Mochua History Group Timahoe
- Swords Historical Society
- Taghmon History Society
- Thomond Archaeological & Historical Society
- Tipperary County Historical Society
- Tisrara Heritage Society
- Tullowphelin Historical Society
- The Old Tuam Society
- Ui Cinsealaigh Historical Society
- Waterford Archaeological & Historical Society
- West Wicklow Historical Society
- Western Archaeology & Historical Society
- Westmeath Archaeological Society
- Westport Historical Society
- Wexford Historical Society
- Whitegate-Aghada Historical Society
- Wicklow Historical Society
- Williamstown Heritage Society

== See also ==
- History of Ireland
- List of museums in the Republic of Ireland
- List of historical societies
