= P. J. Brophy =

Patrick J. (P.J.) Brophy BD (1919 – 1998) was an Irish Catholic priest, historian and educator.

== Work ==
Fr. Brophy taught and served as President of Carlow College from 1970 until 1974. From Castlemore in Tullow, County Carlow. A regular syndicated columnist and contributor to local newspapers e.g. The Nationalist and Leinster Leader and also appeared on television programmes such as The Late Late Show and Nightlight on RTÉ. He also contributed to The Irish Ecclesiastical Record and The Furrow magazines.

Brophy was also a historian and founding member of The Old Carlow Society (now The Carlow Historical & Archaeological Society) in 1946, and he was first editor of its journal, The Carlovana.

== Honours ==
The Catholic Church awarded him the title Monsignor.

He bequeathed some 4500 books to Carlow College and the New Library was named the P. J. Brophy Memorial Library in his honour.

== Writings ==
- "The Birth of Carlow College" By Rev. P. J. Brophy, Carloviana - Journal of the Old Carlow Society Vol. 1. No. 4, New Series, Dec. 1956. Pages 33 – 36.
- "The new church on the Curragh speaks well for Ireland-1959" by Rev. P. J. Brophy, The Nationalist and Leinster Times 14 November 1959.
- "Irish Missionaries" by Rev. P. J. Brophy, The Carlovian, The Carlow College Annual Review 1959.
- "Whatever Happened to Our Liturgical Dreams?" by Fr. P. J. Brophy, The Furrow April 1974.
