= Industrial Heritage Association of Ireland =

The Industrial Heritage Association of Ireland (IHAI) is an all-Ireland body set up in 1996 to foster a greater understanding and appreciation of sites, monuments and items of machinery that together constitute Ireland's industrial heritage and to encourage its protection by the relevant statutory authorities. The IHAI functions as a link between government organisations, NGOs, and individuals working in the field of industrial heritage. By providing opportunities for open discussion and debate the IHAI advances awareness, enjoyment, and conservation of the many facets of industrial heritage.

One of the main objectives of the IHAI is the establishment of a national inventory of industrial sites. To this end, the Heritage Council assisted by publishing Recording and Conserving Ireland’s Industrial Heritage: An Introductory Guide to help public bodies, professionals, voluntary organisations and site owners in the identification, recording, conservation and protection of industrial sites.

The IHAI engages with the public through conferences, workshops, field tours, lectures and publications, special-interest societies, as well as government and non-governmental organisations. Their conferences have covered a range of topics and the papers presented have been published by the IHAI, the most recent being Archaeology of Irish Industry: Recent Excavations (2009). Other titles include The Industrial Heritage of North East Ireland (2002); Power from Steam (1998); and Taking Stock of Ireland’s Industrial Heritage (1998).

The IHAI produces a Newsletter three times a year chronicling the activities of the IHAI and the industrial heritage sector in Ireland generally. Past newsletters are available to the general public on the IHAI website and are a source of information on publications relating to aspects of Ireland’s industrial heritage.

== See also ==
- List of historical societies in Ireland

== Publications ==
Cox, Ron, ed. (2002). Some Aspects of the Industrial Heritage of North-east Ireland: Proceedings of a conference held at the Louth County Museum, Dundalk, 11th November, 2000. Dublin: IHAI. ISBN 0953270629.

Cox, Ron, ed. (1998). Power from Steam: Proceedings of a conference held at The Steam Museum, Straffan, Co. Kildare, 13 September, 1997. Dublin: IHAI. ISBN 0953270610.
