= Irish Hospitality Institute =

Professional association in Ireland

Irish Hospitality Institute (IHI)
- Founded: 1966 as Irish Hotel and Catering Institute (IHCI)
- Location: Dublin, Ireland
- Region served: Ireland
- Members: 1,200
- Website: www.ihi.ie
- Formerly called: Irish Hotel and Catering Institute (IHCI)

The Irish Hospitality Institute (IHI) was founded in 1966 as the Irish Hotel and Catering Institute (IHCI), as a not-for-profit professional body for managers in the hotel, tourism, and catering industries in Ireland, collectively known as the hospitality industry. The IHI promotes professionalism in the hospitality industry by running seminars and education courses for its members; it also promotes courses in educational institutions in Ireland by means of its Graduate of the Year Award and student membership.

Due to the international nature of the workforce, the IHI is also involved in various diversity initiatives.

== Awards ==
The IHI hosts an annual gala dinner to award prizes to figures in the hospitality industry for their achievements that year.

- Graduate of the Year Award
- Young Manager of the Year Award
- Human Resources Manager of the Year Award
- Catering Manager of the Year Award
- Hotel Manager of the Year Award
