= Irish Nutrition and Dietetic Institute =

The Irish Nutrition & Dietetic Institute (INDI) is the national organisation in Ireland for nutrition and dietetic professionals. The INDI's mission is to encourage, foster and maintain the highest possible standards in the science and practice of human nutrition and dietetics, to positively influence the nutrition status and health of the individual and the population in general. This incorporates clinical nutrition, community nutrition, business and industry, research, education and private practice.
