= Catherine Haith =

Catherine (Cathy) Haith née Bennett (d. November 2025) was a British archaeologist and museum curator. She was Curator in the Department of Medieval and Later Antiquities at the British Museum and elected as Fellow of the Society of Antiquaries of London in 2000. Haith contributed to the annual "Medieval Britain and Ireland in..." summaries of finds and excavations of the Medieval Archaeology journal from 1996-1998.

== Select bibliography ==
- Haith, C. 1988. "Un nouveau regard sur le cimetière d'Herpès (Charente)", Revue archéologique de Picardie 3-4. 71-80.
- Longworth, Ian and Cathy Haith. 1992. “Henry Durden and his Collection”, Proceedings of the Dorset Natural History and Archaeological Society 114. 151-60.
- Haith, C. 1997. "Pottery in Early Anglo-Saxon England", in Freestone, I. and Gaimster, D. Pottery in the making: world ceramic traditions. 146-51.
- Watkins, S., Shearman, F., and Haith, C. 1998. "Conservation of metal artifacts from an Anglo-Saxon cemetery at Buckland, Kent, England", in METAL 98 : proceedings of the international conference on metals conservation (Draguignan-Figanières, 27-29 May 1998). 15-21.
- Haith, C. 1999. "Anglo-Saxon Mount", Archaeologia Cantiana 119, 50.
- Haith, C. 2006. "Démêler l’écheveau : les influences culturelles dans le Kent des premiers Anglo-Saxons", Mémoires de l'Association française d'archéologie mérovingienne. 79-85.
