= Killure, County Waterford =

Townland in County Waterford, Ireland

Coordinates: 52°13′05″N 7°05′27″W

Killure (Irish: Cill Iúir) is a townland and civil parish in County Waterford, Ireland, near Waterford Airport.
