= Robert Clarke Shearman =

New Zealand policeman and farmer

Robert Clarke Shearman (1825–1910) was a New Zealand policeman and farmer. He was born in County Kilkenny, Ireland in 1825.
