= Gerardine Meaney =

Irish feminist critic and academic

- Born: 1962 (age 63–64); Waterford
- Education: University College Dublin
- Known for: Irish women writers

Gerardine Meaney (1962–), is a feminist critic and academic based in Dublin.

== Biography ==
Originally from Kilkenny and Waterford, Meaney went to University College Dublin where she graduated with her first degree, a bachelor's in Arts in 1982. She went on to gain a masters before completing her PhD on Muriel Spark, Angela Carter and Doris Lessing. Her work led her to research into Irish women writers who had been ignored previously. Meaney has a particular interest in the collaboration of the digital and literary scholarship. She has run the project "A Portrait of the Artist as a Young Man: Digital Multimedia Edition".

Meaney was the Director of the UCD Humanities Institute, from 2011 to 2016. During this time she was diagnosed with breast cancer. Currently she is the Professor of Cultural Theory and Director of the Centre for Cultural Analytics in the School of English, Drama and Film at UCD. Meaney is a European Research Council researcher leading the VICTEUR project on European Migrants and the British Imagination, Victorian and Neo-Victorian Culture. Meaney was elected to the Royal Irish Academy in 2018.

== Bibliography ==
- Gender, Ireland and Cultural Change (Routledge, 2010)
- Nora (Cork University Press, 2004)
- (Un)like Subjects: Women, Theory, Fiction (Routledge, 1993, 2012)
- Mary O’Dowd and Bernadette Whelan, Reading the Irish Woman: Studies in Cultural Encounters and Exchange, 1714-1960 (Liverpool University Press, 2013)
- Field Day Anthology of Irish Writing: Women's Writing and Traditions, volumes 4 and 5 (2002) (co-editors).
