= Kyteler's Inn =

Public house in Kilkenny

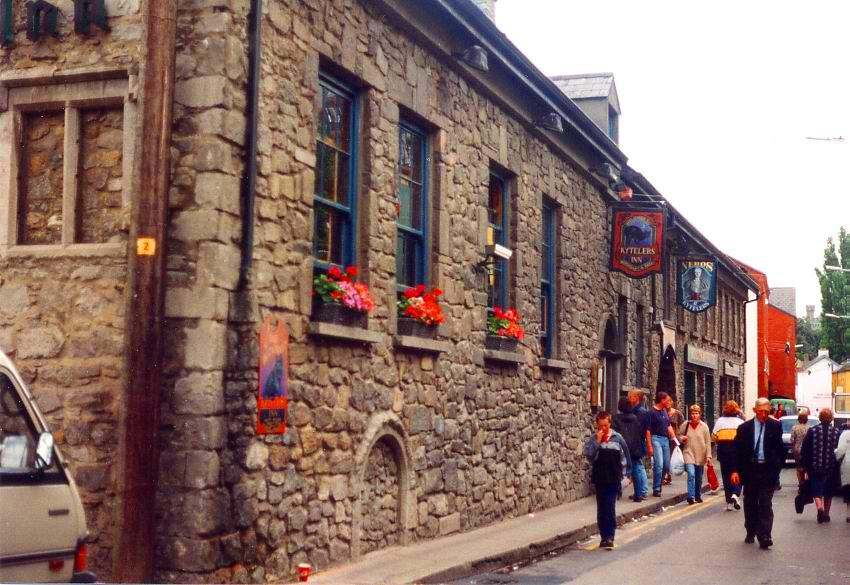
- Kyteler’s Inn c. 1998
- Interactive map of the Kyteler's Inn area
- Former names: Kyteler's Hall

General information
- Location: St. Kieran Street, Kilkenny, Ireland
- Coordinates: 52.6532°N 7.2532°W

Design and construction
- Designations: Record of Protected Structures (RPS #B189)

Website
- kytelersinn.com

Kyteler's Inn (/ˈkɪtlər/) is a public house located in the centre of medieval Kilkenny in Ireland.

With parts of the building dating to the 13th or 14th century, the building is traditionally associated with the Kyteler family and with Dame Alice Kyteler, an alleged witch from the area. Although it is debated if the family lived at this exact location. The building has housed an inn since 1639.

A restoration was carried out in the late 1960s, and the renovated building was blessed with water from St. Kieran's Well in the courtyard in 1967. At the time of the renovation, an archaeological survey to date the building was not undertaken. Archaeologist Conleth Manning expressed particular regret over this since the building has a "fine groin-vaulted undercroft" that makes a 14th-century date plausible. He regrets the fact that a "fine fireplace" was disassembled and rebuilt elsewhere in the building. Manning also condemns the removal of the "original stone stairs to the undercroft" and of the surviving "medieval roof timbers" without any expert examination. Only the lower story dates to the medieval period.

When it was offered for sale in 1975, it housed a restaurant and pub. In 1986 it was sold to its present owner. Noted for offering traditional Irish music, in 2012 it won an award as the best music bar in Ireland.

According to a New York Times article from the late 1970s, the entrance level was then "modernized drab, but down one flight of dark stairs is the 13th century".
