= Anthony T. Lucas =

Irish archaeologist, historian and senior museum official

- Born: 1911; Ireland
- Died: 26 March 1986 (aged 74–75); Dublin
- Occupations: Archaeologist, historian, museologist

Anthony T. Lucas (often A.T. Lucas) (1911 – 26 March 1986) was an Irish archaeologist, historian and museologist who served as president of the Royal Society of Antiquaries of Ireland from 1969 to 1973, and as director of the National Museum of Ireland (NMI) from 1954 to 1976.

Lucas was born in 1911 to an Austrian father and Irish mother, and lived for most of his life in Dublin. He studied at University College Dublin where he received a BA and MA. During his career, Lucas wrote extensively on topics ranging from bog-wood, Insular metalwork, church history, and early medieval folk-life topics such as agricultural techniques such as trapping, snaring and ploughing, food (including pre-potato Irish diets) and clothes.

In the early 1960s, he collaborated with Séamus Ó Duilearga, the chair of the Irish Folklore Commission, to create and circulate a questionnaire on the uses of hay, rushes, and straw. It was sent to 150 people, and from the results, Lucas embarked on an extensive collecting programme in the NMI for objects made of these materials.

He was closely involved with the Irish Folklore Commission, and in 1976 a bibliography of his published works was compiled by archaeologist Etienne Rynne (1932–2012) in Folk & Farm: Essays in Honour of A. T. Lucas.

== Selected monographs and articles ==
- "The Social Role of Relics and Reliquaries in Ancient Ireland". The Journal of the Royal Society of Antiquaries of Ireland, volume 116 (1986). JSTOR 25508904
- "The plundering and burning of churches in Ireland, 7th to 16th century". North Munster Studies, (1967)
- "Bog Wood: A Study in Rural Economy". Bealoideas, 23 (1954)
- "Furze." Stationery Office for the National Museum of Ireland. (1960)

== Sources ==
- Almqvist, Bo; Delaney, James. "Dr. A. T. Lucas (1911–86)". Folklore of Ireland Society, 1987. JSTOR 20522289
