= Royal Society of Antiquaries of Ireland =

- Formation: 1849
- Founders: Kilkenny Archaeological Society
- Headquarters: Society House, 63 Merrion Square, Dublin
- President: Aighleann O’Shaughnessy (2026)
- Website: rsai.ie

The Royal Society of Antiquaries of Ireland (RSAI) is an Irish learned society whose aims are "to preserve, examine and illustrate all ancient monuments and memorials of the arts, manners and customs of the past, as connected with the antiquities, language, literature and history of Ireland". Founded in 1849, it has a countrywide membership from all four provinces of Ireland. Anyone subscribing to the aims of the society, subject to approval by council, may be elected to membership. Current and past members have included historians, archaeologists and linguists, but the society firmly believes in the importance of encouraging an informed general public, and many members are non-professionals.

After the society's move to Dublin in the 1890s, it eventually came to occupy the premises on Merrion Square, where it is still located It now fulfills its original aims through the maintenance of its library and provision of lectures and excursions, as well as the continued publication of its Journal, which is one of the most respected publications in the fields of Irish archaeology and history.

== History ==
=== Foundation ===
The Royal Society of Antiquaries of Ireland was founded in 1849 as the Kilkenny Archaeological Society, by a group of young men with archaeological and historical interests who were based in the Kilkenny area. The aim of the society was the preservation and illustration of the antiquities of Kilkenny, city and county, although this later spread to cover a far wider area, with the society changing its name only five years later to the Kilkenny and South East of Ireland Archaeological Society, both to attract wider membership and to reflect the interests of those who had already joined. By 1868 it had become the Historical and Archaeological Association of Ireland, reflecting its exponential growth, partly due to the widespread circulation of its Journal. In 1869 it was granted a Royal Charter, and the right to elect Fellows, and in 1890 it moved to Dublin, changing its name to the Royal Society of Antiquaries of Ireland, as it took on what it saw as a national role, becoming in 1891, according to its Honorary Secretary Robert Cochrane, "not only the largest Antiquarian Society in Great Britain and Ireland, but also the largest in the world".

=== Graves and Prim ===
The two first, and highly dynamic Honorary General Secretaries, the Revd. James Graves (1815–86), and John G. A. Prim (1821–75), a newspaper man, were responsible for its initial success. These cousins had had an interest in Kilkenny antiquities from their youngest days, when they had rambled as far afield as Kilfane Church to see the famous tomb sculpture of Cantwell Fada. Graves had been making sketches of the ancient monasteries of the vicinity since his student days in Trinity College Dublin in the 1830s, while Prim had found time despite his hectic schedule at the 'Kilkenny Moderator' to start collecting Irish ballads and transcribing from medieval manuscripts as early as 1841. Their knowledge of local antiquities was matched by the idealism of the organisation itself, which was non-sectarian, including the Catholic Robert Cane, later Mayor of Kilkenny, as well as Philip Moore, a Catholic priest who remained a close friend of Prim's to the end of his life. Its subscription rate, at 5 shillings a year, was also very modest in comparison with most English archaeological societies, many of which adopted high subscription rates with the intention of promoting a socially exclusive and often highly aristocratic membership.

=== Irish antiquarianism and archaeology in the 1840s ===
The society's foundation was no doubt influenced by the general revival of interest in ancient Irish antiquities and history which the Ordnance Survey had sparked off. George Petrie (1790–1866), who had been actively involved in the OS was also revitalising the Antiquities Committee of the Royal Irish Academy, and opening up critically sound debate on early Christian buildings in Ireland with the publication of his book The Ecclesiastical Architecture of Ireland: An Essay on the Origins and Uses of the Round Towers of Ireland, in 1845. Nevertheless, it was a time of increasing danger for the heritage of Ireland, as the Irish language suffered severe setbacks after the Famine of the 1840s, and was vanishing from County Kilkenny even around the time the society was establishing itself. As superstitious beliefs died out, people became less cautious of destroying the field monuments such as raths and stone circles, which hitherto had been avoided in cultivation of the land. Meanwhile, many of the standing buildings were in increasing danger from the effects of rain and frost, as much as from wanton vandalism.

=== Conservation ===
The society's early aims therefore included the conservation of endangered buildings, and they carried out valuable work at Clonmacnoise, County Offaly, Jerpoint Cistercian Abbey, County Kilkenny and St. Francis Abbey in Kilkenny city. However, with the passing of the Church Temporalities Act in 1869, many of these structures came to be vested in the Board of Works, which then took over the duty of conserving them, appointing Thomas Newenham Deane Inspector of National Monuments in March 1875. This relieved the society of its responsibilities in active preservation of buildings, although it continued to participate by drawing the board's attention to individual cases.

=== Museum ===
The society's interest in preservation was also reflected in the museum it built up of objects donated by various members, as well as those objects found during the archaeological excavations it carried out itself. Many items from the museum subsequently became part of the collections of the National Museum of Ireland.

=== Preservation through illustration ===
The society achieved its aim of illustration of antiquities, not only through the published journal, which from its creation contained both lithographs and engravings (and later photographs), but also by a comprehensive effort to photograph the antiquities of the 32 counties of Ireland.

== Publications ==
The RSAI publishes a peer-reviewed journal, generally abbreviated as JRSAI. A volume appears each year, but this is often published in a 1st and a 2nd part. The parts can, however, be ignored for the purposes of citation as pages are numbered continuously through the volume. The volumes are numbered consecutively or by series. The volume that appeared in 1921, for example, is numbered consecutively as 51 but is also known as volume XI of the VIth series.

== Governance ==
The affairs of the society are conducted by the elected president, officers and council (all of whose services are voluntary).

=== Presidents ===
The following have served as presidents of the society:

- 1849–1877: Rev. Charles A. Vignoles
- 1878–1887: Charles FitzGerald, 4th Duke of Leinster
- 1888–1894: Lord James Wandesford Butler
- 1895–1897: Sir Thomas Drew
- 1898–1899: The Right Hon. Charles Owen O'Conor, O'Conor Don
- 1900–1902: Edward Percival Wright
- 1903–1905: John Ribton Garstin
- 1906–1908: Patrick Weston Joyce
- 1909–1912: Robert Cochrane
- 1913–1916: George Noble Plunkett, Count Plunkett
- 1917–1920: Thomas Johnson Westropp
- 1920–1924: Michael Joseph McEnery
- 1924–1928: R. A. Stewart Macalister
- 1928–1930: W. F. Butler
- 1931–1932: Goddard H. Orpen
- 1933–1936: Thomas LeFanu
- 1937–1940: Eoin MacNeill
- 1941–1944: Harold G. Leask
- 1945–1948: John Ryan S.J.
- 1949–1952: Liam Price
- 1953–1956: Seán P. Ó Ríordáin
- 1957–1960: Frank Mitchell
- 1961–1964: Joseph Raftery
- 1965–1968: Helen Maybury Roe
- 1969–1972: A. T. Lucas
- 1973–1976: Henry A. Wheeler
- 1977–1980: Michael Herity
- 1981–1984: James Francis Lydon
- 1985–1988: Etienne Rynne
- 1989–1992: Seán Ó Nualláin
- 1993–1996: Rhoda Kavanagh
- 1997–2000: Próinséas Ní Chatháin
- 2001–2004: Conleth Manning
- 2005–2008: Aideen Ireland
- 2009–2012: Charles Doherty
- 2013–2016: Rachel Moss
- 2017–2020 : Conor Lucey
- 2021-2025 : Kelly Fitzgerald
- 2025- : Aighleann O’Shaughnessy

== See also ==
- List of Antiquarian Societies
- List of historical societies in Ireland
