= Killure, County Kilkenny =

Coordinates: 52°39′05″N 7°01′32″W

Killure is a village near Goresbridge, County Kilkenny, Ireland. Killure a place in Ireland, which as of 2016, had an estimated population of 727.
