= Kilkenny Archaeological Society =

Organization in Ireland

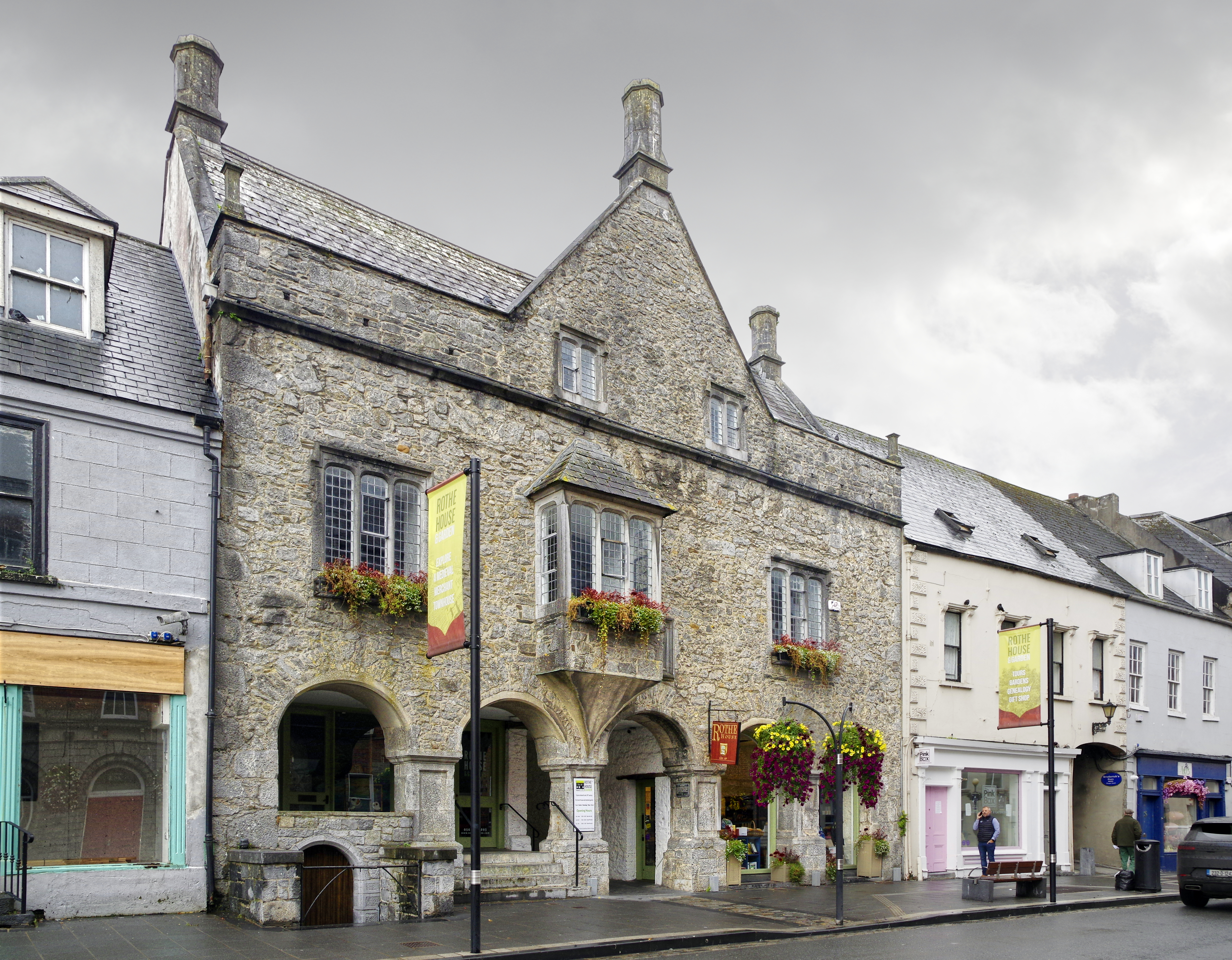
- Rothe House, headquarters of the Kilkenny Archaeological Society
- Abbreviation: KAS
- Formation: 7 March 1946; 80 years ago
- Type: Friendly society
- Purpose: Promote history and archaeology of Kilkenny
- Headquarters: Rothe House
- Region served: County Kilkenny
- President: Fonsie Mealy
- Website: www.kilkennyarchaeologicalsociety.ie

The Kilkenny Archaeological Society is an archaeological society in County Kilkenny, Ireland.

== History ==
The Kilkenny Archaeological Society was founded in 1946. An older society with the same name existed, which developed into the Royal Society of Antiquaries of Ireland.

Rothe House in Kilkenny is owned by the Kilkenny Archaeological Society since 1962 and functions as their headquarters and local history museum.

== Old Kilkenny Review ==
Old Kilkenny Review
- Discipline: Archaeology, History
- Language: English

Publication details
- History: 1948-present
- Publisher: Kilkenny Archaeological Society (Ireland)
- Frequency: Annual

Standard abbreviations
- ISO 4: Old Kilkenny Rev.

Indexing
- ISSN: 0332-0774

Links
- Index of annual journal from 1948 to 2017

The Kilkenny Archaeological Society publishes the Old Kilkenny Review, a historical journal which reviews County Kilkenny's history.

== See also ==
- List of historical societies in Ireland
