= List of almshouses in Ireland =

The following is a list of Irish almshouses, also known as Gift Houses:

== Leinster ==
- Dublin – Clondalkin almshouses
- Dublin – Stillorgan (Charles Sheils houses, now demolished)
- Shee Alms House, Kilkenny
- Switzer's Asylum, Kilkenny
- Various Dublin almhouses
- The Alleys, Drogheda, County Louth
- St John's Home, Drogheda, County Louth
- Netterville, Dowth, County Meath
- Ormonde Almshouses, Barrack Street, Kilkenny

== Munster ==
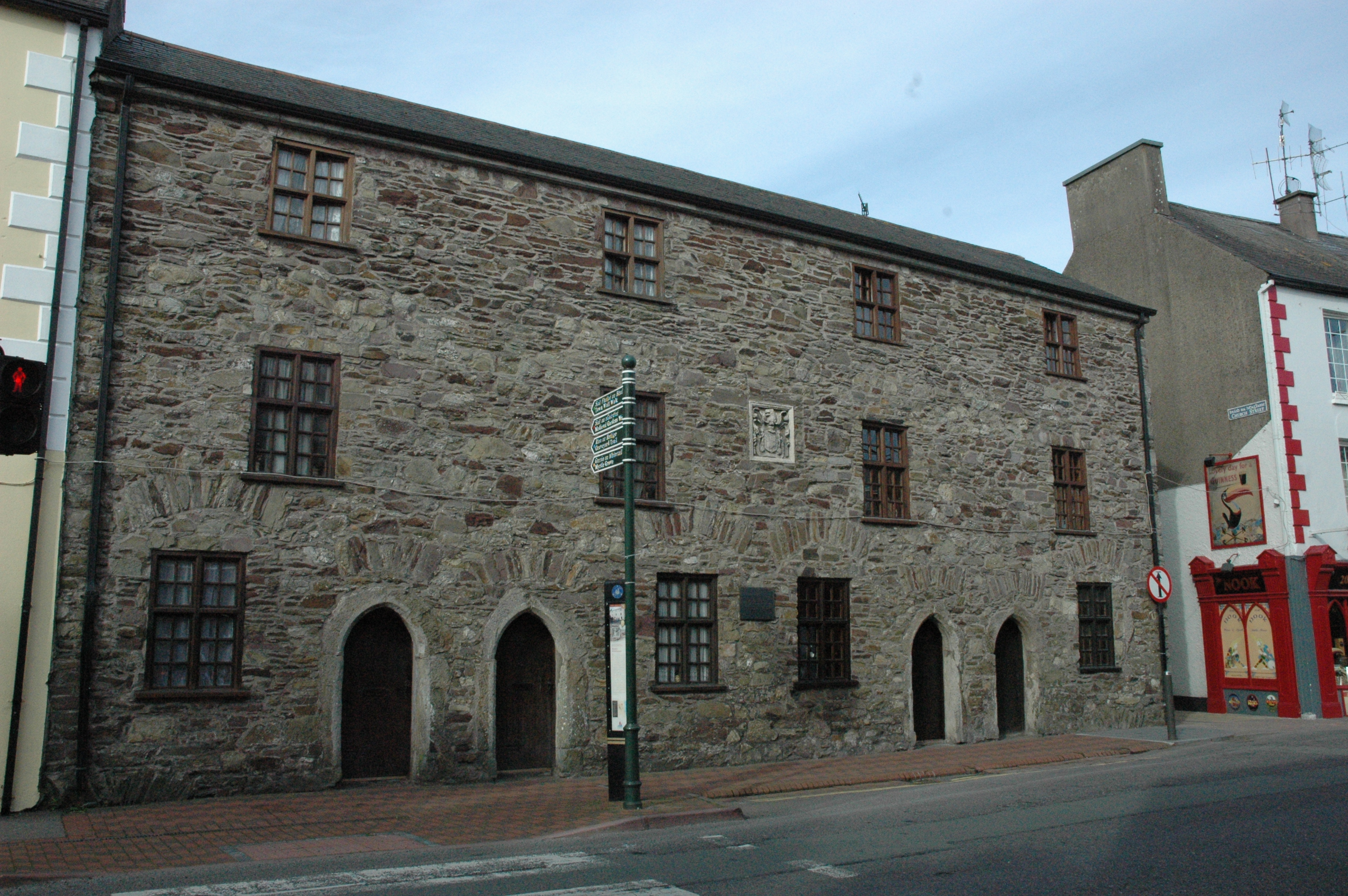
Youghal Almshouse

- Skiddy's Almshouse, Cork
- French Church, Waterford
- Southwell Gift Houses, Kinsale
- Denny Alms house, Tralee
- Youghal Alms House, the 17th-century almshouses were constructed by Richard Boyle, 1st Earl of Cork in 1602 for widows. Each tenant received two shillings a week, enough to sustain her. Around the same time (1612), Sir Richard Boyle built a hospital and a free school. For his efforts in colonising Munster, Sir Richard Boyle was granted the title and dignity Lord Boyle in 1616. When a poll tax of two shillings was introduced in 1697, those living by alms were exempt. St Mary's Collegiate Church in the town still contains many monuments, including the tomb of Richard Boyle himself.
- Limerick Almshouse
- King's Square, Mitchelstown
- Thurles Almshouse
- Villiers Almshouses, Limerick

== Connacht ==
- Westport Almshouse, County Mayo

== Ulster ==
- Seaforde Almshouses, Newcastle Road, Seaforde, County Down
- Gills Almshouses, Carrickfergus, County Antrim, designed by Charles Lanyon and erected in 1842
- Widow's Almshouses, Rockcorry, County Monaghan
- Blayney Almhouses, Castleblayney, County Monaghan
