= Kingsweston Iron Bridge =

Footbridge in Bristol, England

Coordinates: 51°29′33″N 2°39′26″W

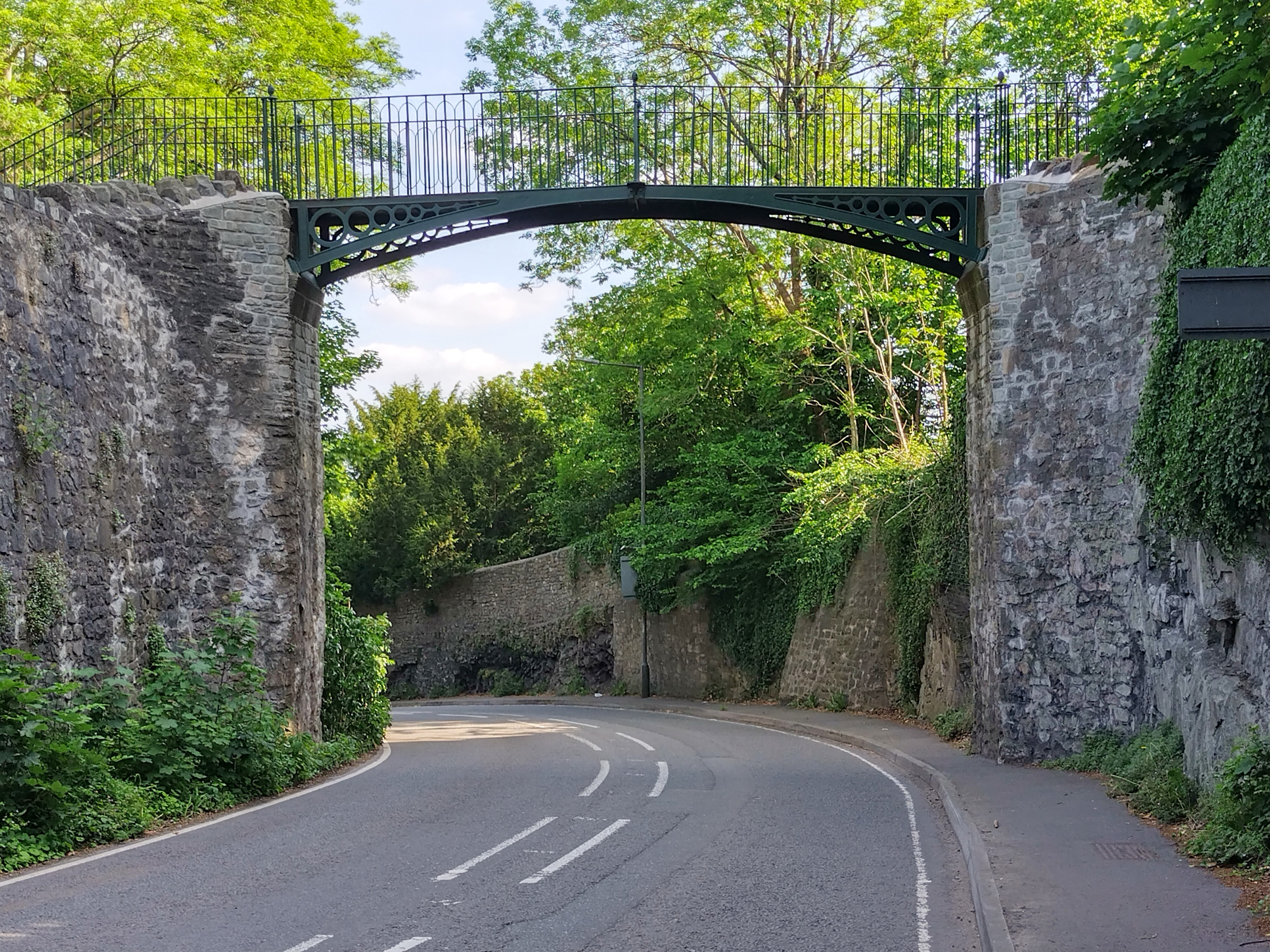
Kingsweston Iron Bridge in 2025

Kingsweston Iron Bridge is a footbridge in Sea Mills, Bristol, UK, that crosses the B4057 Kings Weston Road. It was built in 1821 and is a grade II listed building. Following a vehicle strike in 2015 it was closed for nearly nine years until it was repaired and reinstalled in a higher position in 2024.

== History ==
The bridge dates from 1821 when the cutting it crosses was excavated for an improved turnpike road engineered by John Loudon McAdam. The cutting divided the Kings Weston estate, a popular tourist destination, in two and separated the Echo, a small pavilion which is now grade I listed, from the Kings Weston Inn. The origin of the bridge is unknown but it may have been made at Coalbrookdale.

On 8 January 1959 the bridge was Grade II listed.

The bridge was struck and damaged by an unknown lorry on 5 November 2015. It was subsequently closed to pedestrians. Bristol City Council committed to repairing the bridge. A campaign group Save the Iron Bridge was later formed. The group has raised concerns for pedestrian safety as pedestrians have to cross King Weston Road while the bridge is closed.

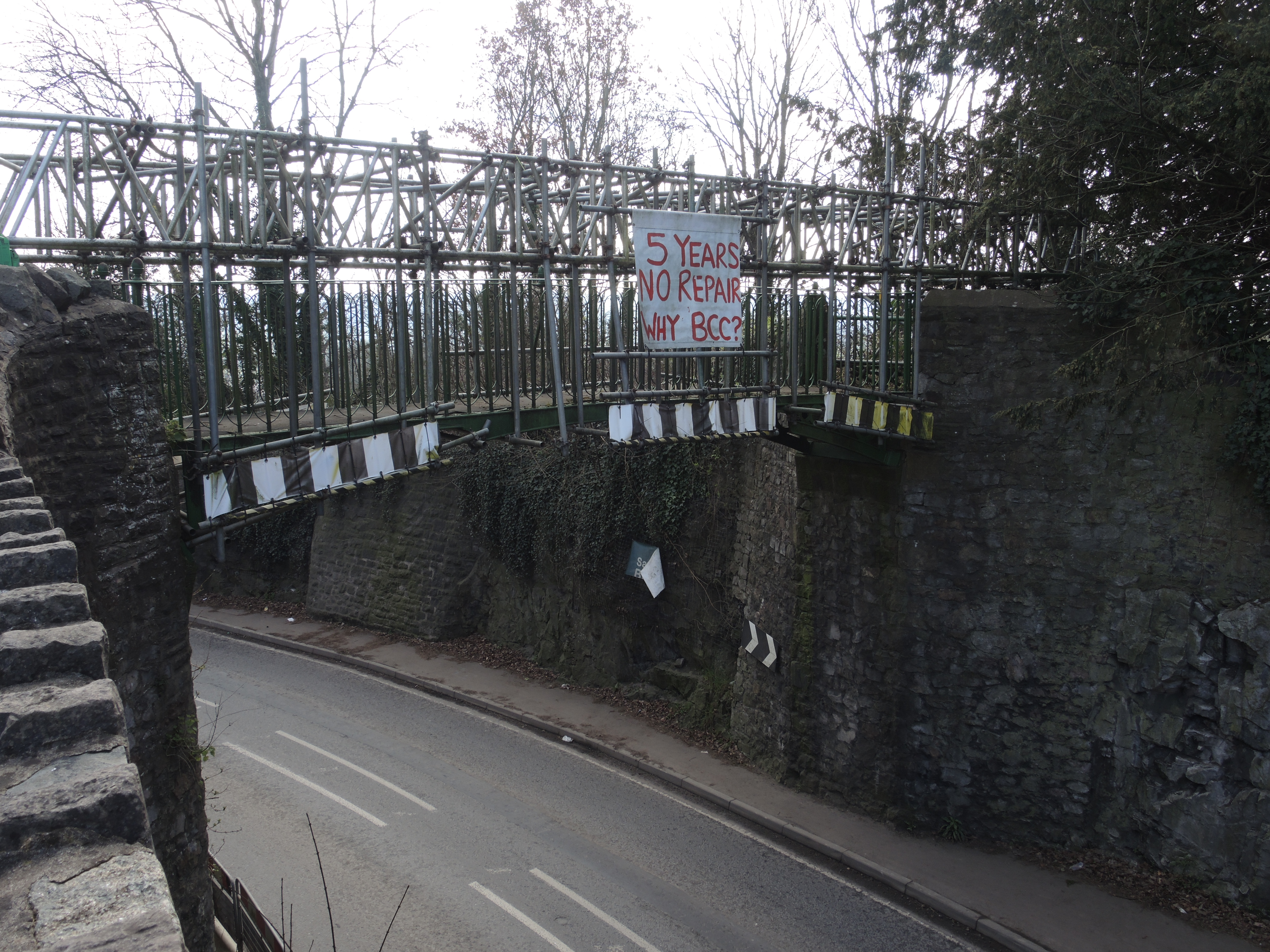
The out-of-use bridge in 2023, with a campaigners' banner bearing the words "5 YEARS NO REPAIR WHY BCC?"

In March 2019, plans to repair the bridge and raise it were released. The council stated that it would fund the work once it received approval from Historic England. However, in 2021 the council withdrew its planning application to repair the bridge, saying it was in continued discussion with Historic England. The council subsequently said it may not have adequate funds to repair the bridge.

In 2022, the council allocated money in its yearly budget for repairs to the bridge. In May 2022, the council again applied for planning permission to raise the bridge. Work to repair the bridge began in November 2023. The bridge was removed and repaired off site while work took place on site to raise the abutments. The repaired bridge was reinstalled in its new position on 30 April 2024 and reopened on 8 July.

== Modifications ==
The 2024 modifications saw the bridge raised by 1 metre (3.3 feet) with steps added at either side. Ramps were initially planned for accessibility; however, these were eliminated as they were deemed "too damaging to the historic surroundings". Local Labour Party councillor Don Alexander described the decision as "slightly disappointing"; Green Party councillor Ed Plowden said the planning committee had found the decision difficult but accessibility on the approaches was already poor due to the hilly terrain.
