= Switzer's Asylum =

Kilkenny Almshouse

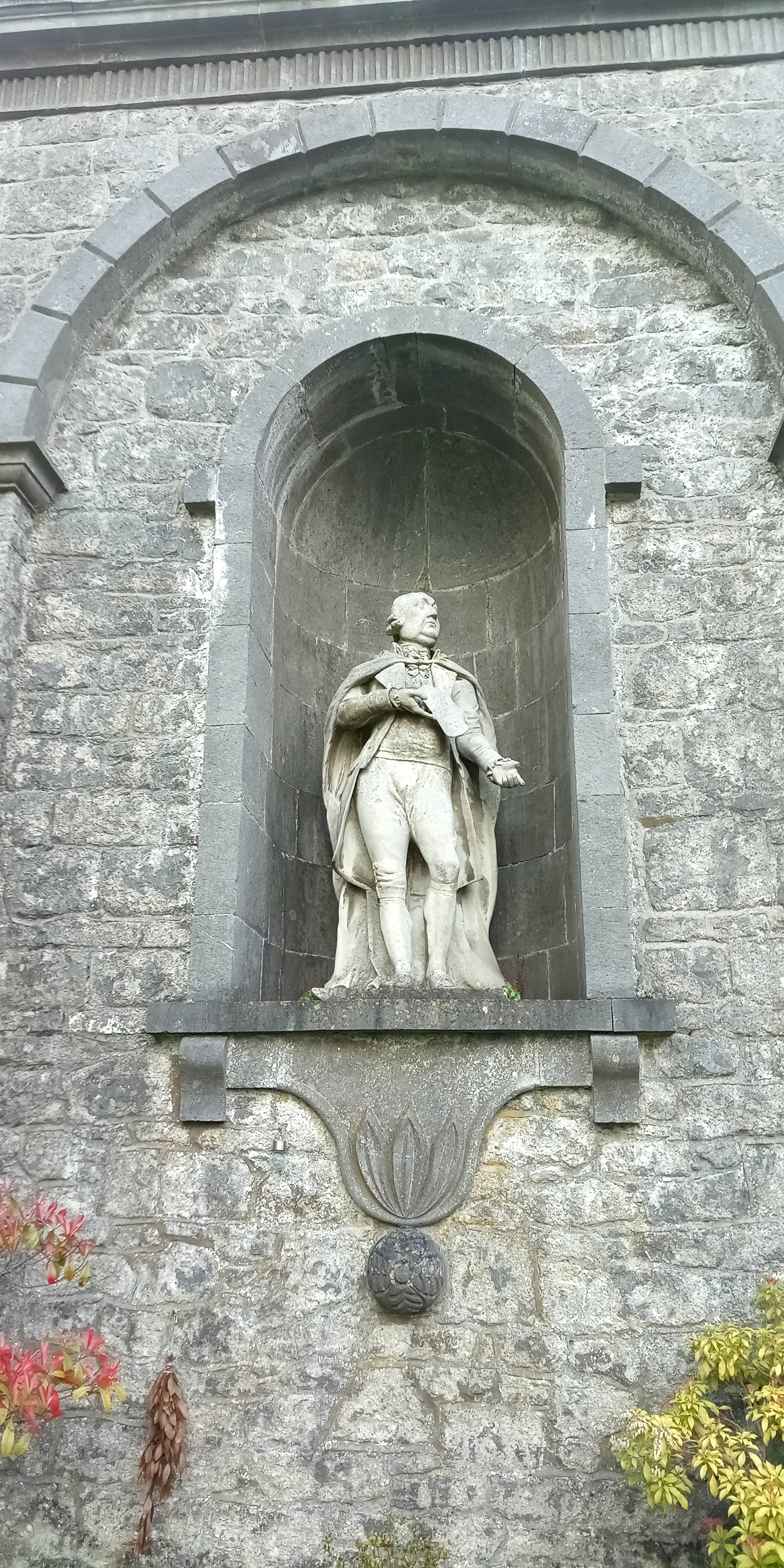

- Location within Ireland

Religion
- Affiliation: Church of Ireland
- Province: Leinister

Location
- Location: Nuncio Road, Kilkenny, Ireland
- Interactive map of Switzer's Asylum
- Coordinates: 52°38′53″N 7°14′40″W

Architecture
- Style: classically derived
- Founder: James Switzer
- Completed: 1804

Switzer's Asylum also known as Saint James Asylum was founded by James Switzer of Kilkenny in the 1800s for the housing of twenty poor widows.

== Asylum ==
The asylum was founded with the aim of housing twelve Protestant and eight Roman Catholic widows in the units with an additional sum of twenty pounds per year. Today Switzer's Asylum is nineteen units managed by the Church of Ireland in St Patrick’s Parish, Kilkenny. The foundation was established by Act of Parliament which identified who would be entitled to be resident in the units. No one who had ever been a servant, the widow, daughter or niece of a servant could be allowed there. The rule was to allow

decent and respectable persons, the widows or daughters of respectable persons resident in the county or city of Kilkenny or county of Carlow for ten years or more.

== Building ==
The building is a detached almshouse with five three-bays, two-storey high units with a single three bay two storey breakfront. The units are set in a small cul-de-sac of private grounds with a limestone surrounding wall. There is a monument at the front of the building which is a statue by Benjamin Schrowder of Dublin of the founder. It has classically derived proportions though modern renovations have eroded some of the character. It was built in the beginning of the 1800s with work completed about 1803 or 1804. It was renovated in 1992.

== Founder ==
James Switzer was a native of Kilkenny and worked as the building contractor on the Kilkenny City Military Barracks. He used some of the left over building materials of the barracks to complete the Almshouse.

== See also ==
- List of almshouses in Ireland
