= Shee Alms House =

Almshouse

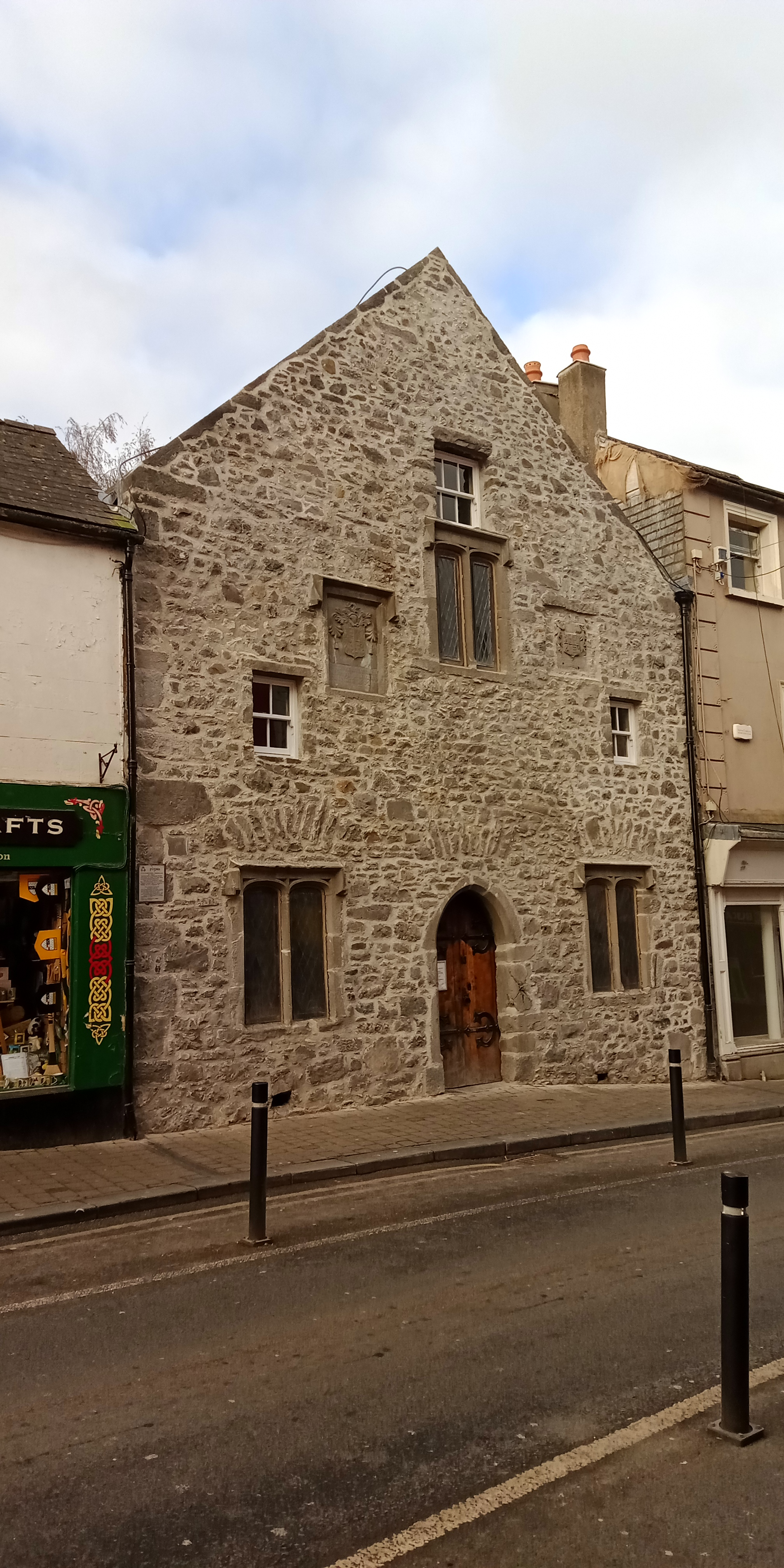
- Shee Alms House in 2023

- Location within Ireland

Location
- Location: Rose Inn Street, Kilkenny, Ireland
- Interactive map of Shee Alms House
- Coordinates: 52°39′05″N 7°15′06″W

Architecture
- Style: Tudor
- Founder: Sir Richard Shee
- Completed: 1582

Shee Alms House was founded by the Shee family in 1582 'to accommodate twelve poor persons' in the city of Kilkenny, Ireland. It is a nationally significant Tudor period almshouse.

== House ==
Sir Richard Shee founded the alms house, originally called the Hospital of Jesus, during the period when the family was a powerful merchant family in Kilkenny. He created the house in 1582 and endowed it in his last will in 1603. Lucas Shee, his son, arranged a royal charter for the Almshouse which was granted 4 November 1609. In 1752 the alms house was sold by his descendant Edmond Shee. The family were dispossessed during the Cromwellian period. However they regained control and power in the 18th century. Sir Nicholas Power O'Shee of Gardenmorris, County Waterford took back ownership of the house in 1756 and it operated as an almshouse until 1830. The house was also used as a Catholic chapel before the 1800s and as a hospital in 1837. It became a shop in the early 20th century. The Alms house was in 1978 acquired by Kilkenny Corporation and restored to its original condition. It was reopened as the city tourist office in 1981.

The building is a terraced two-bay two-storey gable-fronted rubble stone house, with cut-limestone features, and a half-dormer attic.

== See also ==
- List of almshouses in Ireland
