= Robert Southwell (diplomat) =

Anglo-Irish politician and diplomat

The Right Honourable Sir Robert Southwell FRS
- Portrait by Godfrey Kneller, c. 1695–1720

9th President of the Royal Society
- In office 1690–1695
- Preceded by: Thomas Herbert
- Succeeded by: Charles Montagu

Personal details
- Born: 31 December 1635 County Cork, Ireland
- Died: 11 September 1702 (aged 66) King's Weston House, Bristol
- Resting place: Henbury
- Spouse: Elizabeth Dering (m. 1664; died 1682)
- Children: Edward Southwell Sr. 5 others
- Parents: Robert Southwell (father); Helena Gore (mother)
- Education: University of Oxford (BA)

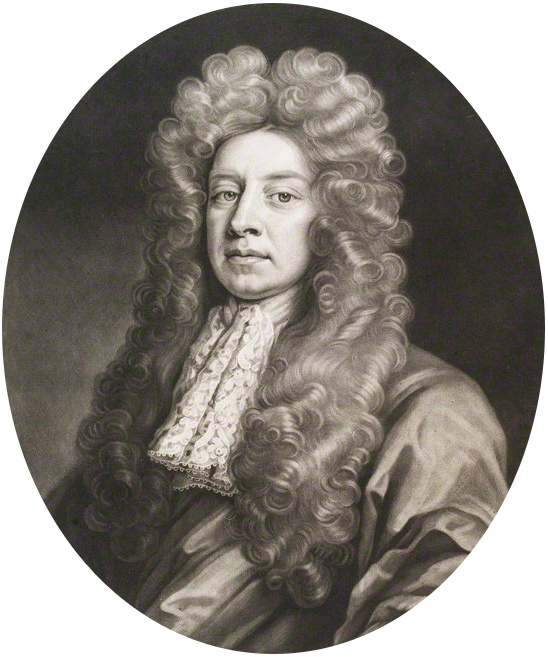
Robert Southwell

Sir Robert Southwell FRS (31 December 1635 – 11 September 1702) was an Anglo-Irish politician and diplomat. He was Secretary of State for Ireland and President of the Royal Society from 1690.

== Background and education ==
Robert Southwell was born near Kinsale in County Cork on 31 December 1635 to his namesake Robert Southwell (1608-1677) and Helena Gore, daughter of Major Robert Gore, of Sherston, Wiltshire. The family had settled in Ireland a couple of generations earlier, and his father had become a customs official at Kinsale in 1631. Like other Munster planters, he was threatened by the Irish Rebellion of 1641. During the Civil War, he followed the Royalist cause, placing him in a weak position. This may be why his son was sent to Christchurch, Hampshire in 1650, before graduating to Queen's College, Oxford, from which he graduated BA in 1655. Between 1659 and 1661, he travelled in Europe meeting some of the leading intellectuals of his time. He was elected a Fellow of the Royal Society in 1662.

== Public office ==
On his return to Ireland, his father wanted him to find employment that would keep him in Ireland. He obtained the post of secretary to the Commission of Prizes in 1664. Soon after, he married Elizabeth Dering (1649–1682), daughter of Sir Edward Dering, 2nd Baronet, by whom his son Edward Southwell was born. Her marriage portion of £1500 enabled him to buy one of the four clerkships of the Privy Council.

His linguistic abilities suited him for diplomatic service. He was appointed in November 1665 as an emissary to Portugal, being knighted before he left. There he assisted in securing the peace between Spain and Portugal, which was achieved in February 1668. He returned to England, but was sent back to Portugal, staying for over another year.

In October 1671, he was dispatched to Brussels as ambassador. On his return, he was elected to the English Parliament for Penryn in 1673. He also took up again the post of secretary to the Commission of Prizes, which he had resigned in 1667 and became his father's deputy as Vice-Admiral of Munster. He also became a Commissioner of Excise in 1671.

Southwell was embarrassed by the Popish Plot, being forced to testify at the trial of Edward Colman that Titus Oates, whom he detested, was telling the truth about the evidence he had given at a crucial Council meeting, and sold his clerkship of the Privy Council in 1679. However, he remained in favour, being appointed in spring 1680 as an envoy to the Elector of Brandenburg, with the object of constructing an alliance against France. This took him to the courts of the Prince of Orange and the Duke of Brunswick–Lüneburg, but the project was no longer what Charles II wanted.

In 1685, he was elected to Parliament again, this time for Lostwithiel. However, he was out of office in this period, having lost his Excise place in 1681.

== After the Glorious Revolution ==
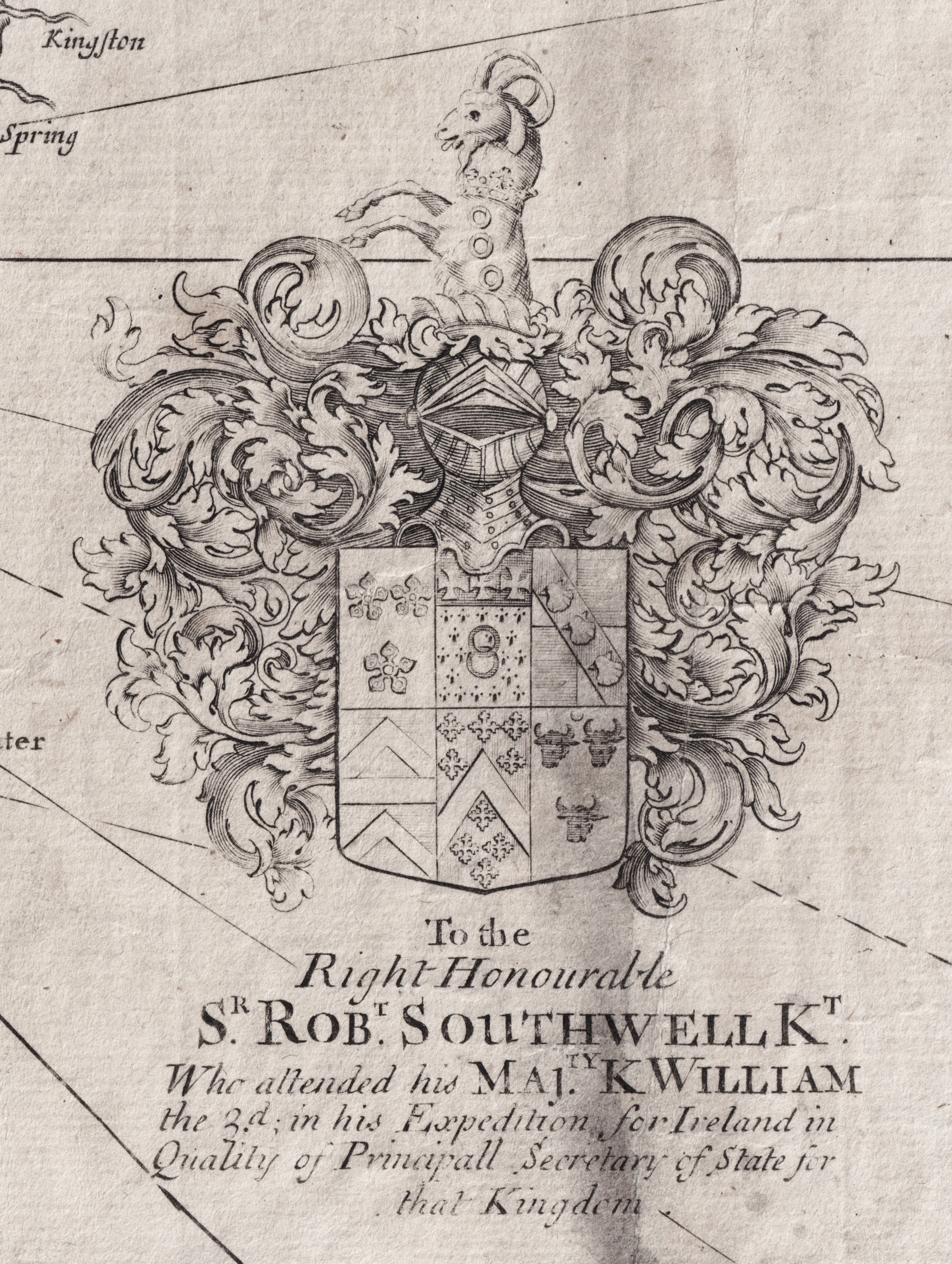
Arms of Sir Robert Southwell as depicted on a chart of the Bristol Channel dedicated to him by Grenvile Collins, c. 1693

After the accession of William and Mary II of England, Southwell accompanied William to Ireland, as his principal secretary, after the deposed James II had landed at Kinsale in his attempt to recover his kingdom. He was in Ireland from June to October 1690. In December he was elected as President of the Royal Society, a post to which he was re-elected annually until 1695. He also held office as a Customs Commissioner from 1689 until 1697. He died at his estate King's Weston House near Bristol, on 11 September 1702 and was buried nearby in Henbury church in Gloucestershire. Though he remained living in England Southwell remembered his Irish roots by founding almshouses in Kinsale.

== Family ==
Southwell married, on 26 January 1664, Elizabeth, eldest daughter of Sir Edward Dering of Surrenden-Dering in Kent. Their children were: Rupert, born on 21 May 1670, and died on 8 May 1678; Edward Southwell, his heir; and four daughters—Helena, Elizabeth, Mary, and Catherine.

== See also ==
- List of presidents of the Royal Society

Parliament of England
Preceded by William Pendarves; John Birch	MP for Penryn; 1673–1679; With: John Birch 1673–1679; Francis Trefusis 1679	Succeeded by Sir Nicholas Slanning; Charles Smythe
Preceded by Sir John Carew; Walter Kendall	MP for Lostwithiel; 1685–1689; With: Sir Matthias Vincent	Succeeded by Francis Robartes; Walter Kendall
Diplomatic posts
Unknown	British Envoy to Portugal; 1665–1669	Unknown
Unknown	British Ambassador at Brussels; 1670	Unknown
Unknown	British Envoy to Brandenburg; 1680–1681	Unknown
Professional and academic associations
Preceded by Thomas Herbert	9th President of the Royal Society; 1690–1695	Succeeded by Charles Montagu
