= List of vice-admirals of Munster =

Vice Admiral of Munster
- Country: United Kingdom
- Type: Naval administration
- Role: Admiralty court and Naval Jurisdiction.

This is a list of the vice-admirals of Munster, a province in the south of Ireland.

Prior to 1585 the whole of Ireland was served by a single vice-admiral, namely Thomas Radcliffe, 3rd Earl of Sussex (1558–1565), Gerald Fitzgerald, 11th Earl of Kildare (1564–1573) and Thomas Butler, 10th Earl of Ormonde (1585). Separate vice-admiralties were then established for Munster in 1585, for Ulster by 1602, for Leinster by 1612 and for Connaught by 1615.

== Vice-admirals of Munster ==
Source (1585–1561):

Source (1661–):

- 1585 John Norris
- 1585–1598 no appointment known
- 1598 Henry Cowper
- 1599 George Warham
- 1599–1606 no appointment known
- 1606 Thomas Smith
- 1607 Humphrey Jobson
- 1607–1610 no appointment known
- 1610–1613 William Howard, Lord Howard of Effingham
- 1613 Sir John Ferne
- 1613–1624 no appointment known
- 1624–1633 Henry Cary, 1st Viscount Falkland
- 1634–1641 Thomas Wentworth, 1st Viscount Wentworth
- 1641 Robert Sydney, 2nd Earl of Leicester
- 1641–1645 no appointment known
- 1645–1648 Roger Boyle, 1st Baron Broghill
- 1648–1660 no appointment known
- 1660–1670 Sir William Penn
- 1670–1677 Robert Southwell Sr.
- 1691–1701 Sir Robert Southwell
- 1701–1730 Edward Southwell Sr.
- 1733–1755 Edward Southwell Jr.
- 1755–1758 Brabazon Ponsonby, 1st Earl of Bessborough
- 1758–1793 William Ponsonby, 2nd Earl of Bessborough
- 1822–1826 Henry Beresford, 2nd Marquess of Waterford
- 1838–1856 William Hare, 2nd Earl of Listowel
