= Kings Weston House =

Historic building in Bristol, England, UK

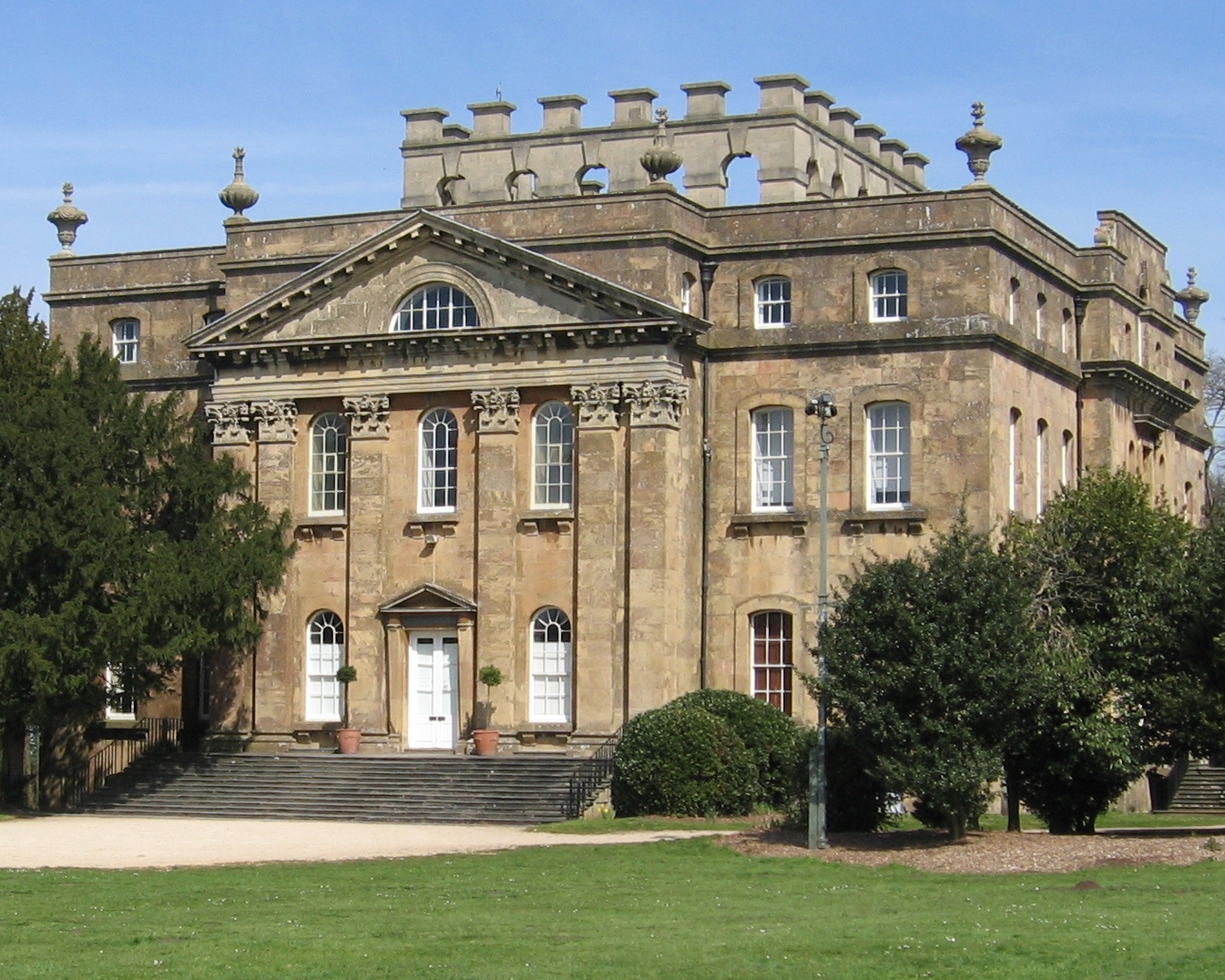

- Location within Bristol

General information
- Architectural style: English Baroque
- Location: Lawrence Weston, Bristol, England
- Coordinates: 51.494382°N 2.661541°W
- Construction started: 1712
- Completed: 1719
- Client: Edward Southwell

Design and construction
- Architect: Sir John Vanbrugh

Kings Weston House (grid reference ST529771) is a historic building in Kings Weston Lane, Kingsweston, Bristol, England. Built during the early 18th century, it was remodelled several times, most recently in the mid-19th century. The building was owned by several generations of the Southwell family. By World War I, the house was used as a hospital and then later used as a school by the University of Bath School of Architecture. The building is today used as a conference and wedding venue, as well as a communal residence.

== History ==
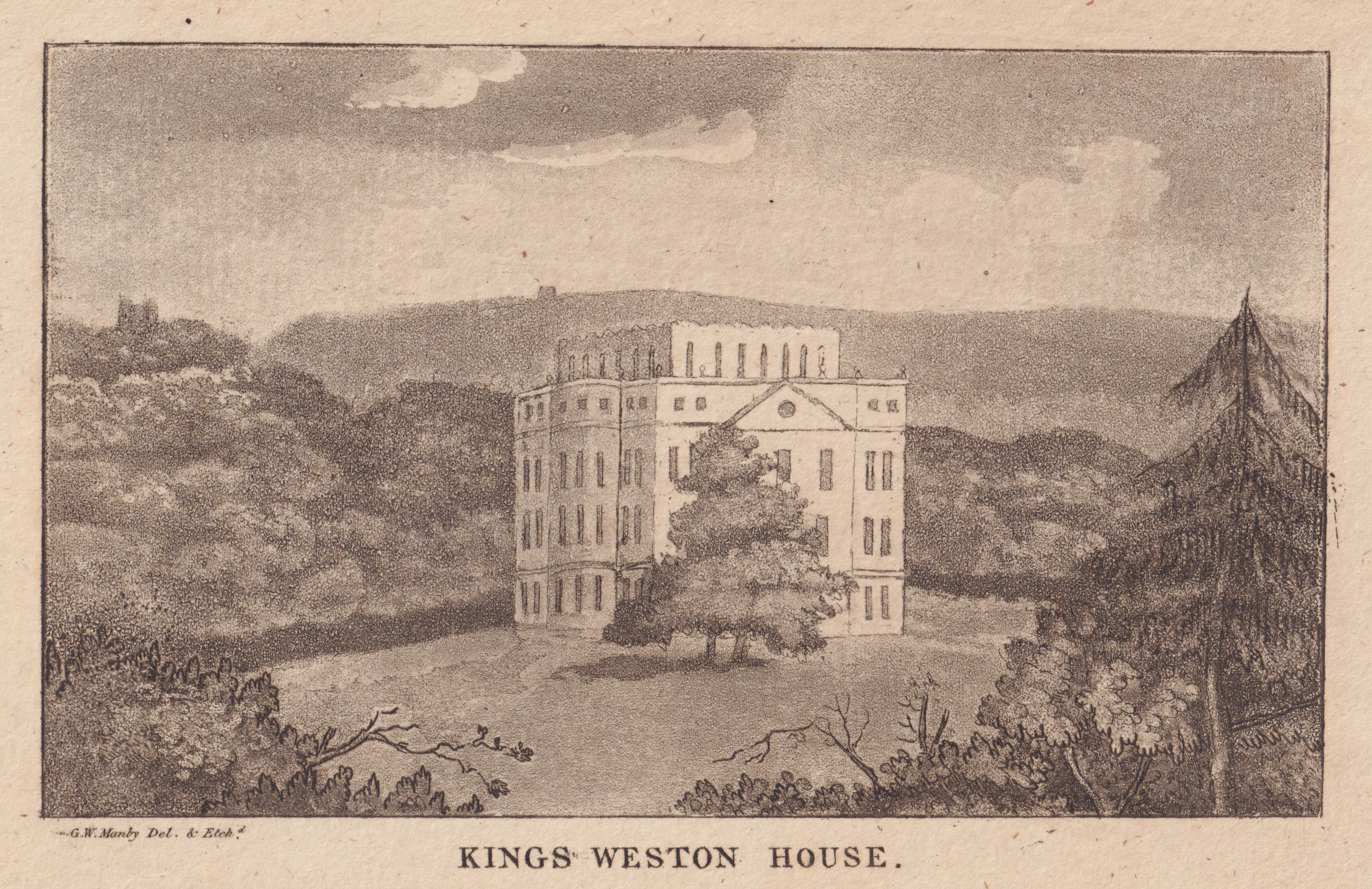
Kings Weston House in 1802

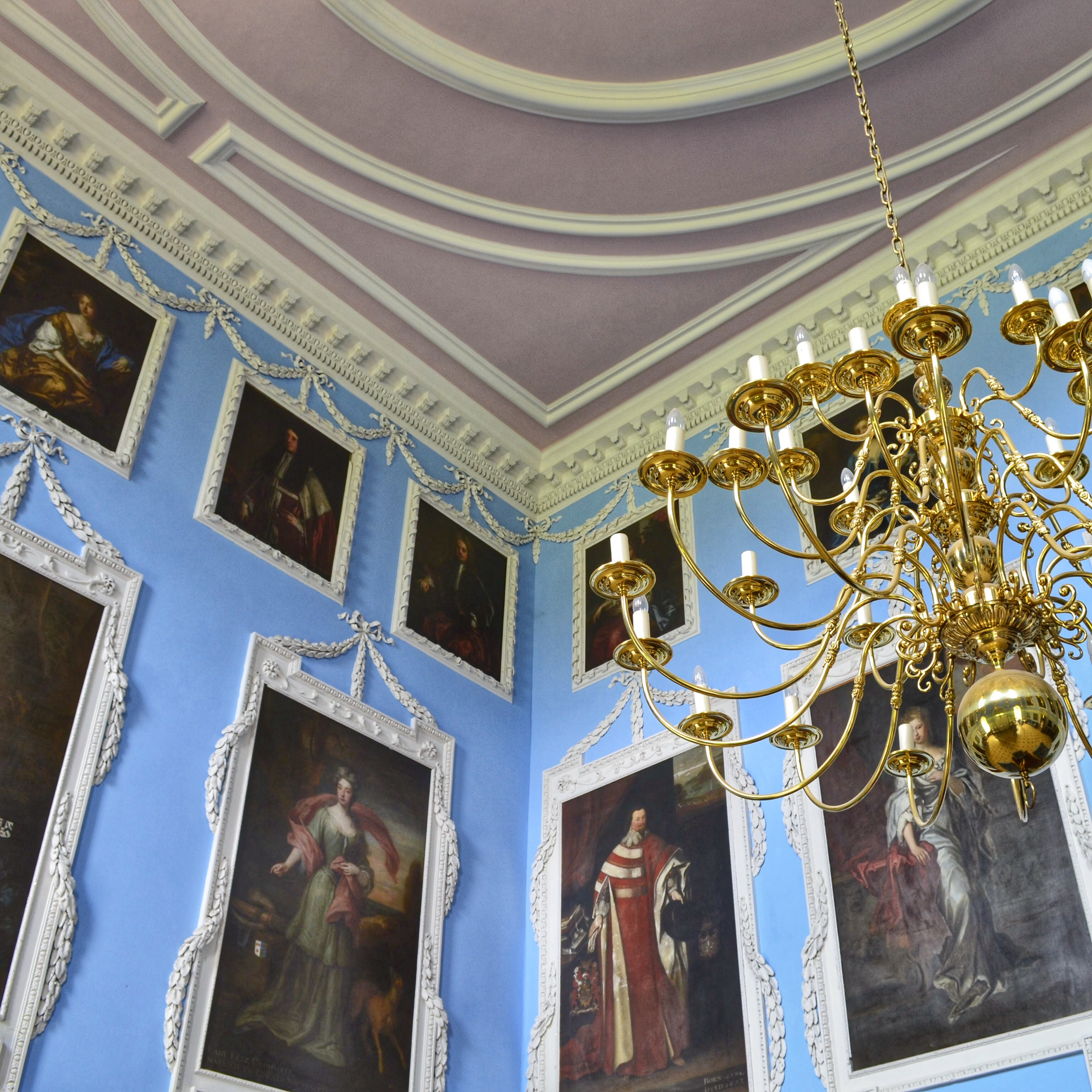
Portraits of various members of the Southwell family hang in the entrance hall of Kingsweston House

The building was built between 1712 and 1719, and was designed by Sir John Vanbrugh for the lawyer and politician Edward Southwell on the site of an earlier Tudor house. It was then remodelled in 1763–1768 by Robert Mylne and again between 1845 and 1850 by Thomas Hopper. Visiting the house in c. 1801, the author and inventor, George William Manby, remarked that its interior:

'corresponds with the exterior for variety and elegance; its collection of paintings is numerous, highly finished, and extremely valuable, being by celebrated masters; they are in fine preservation'.

The Kings Weston estate possesses one of the largest collections of buildings designed by Sir John Vanbrugh in the UK. Whilst the house and the majority of the estate's buildings are still standing, others have been demolished or have been heavily altered. Bristol is the only UK city outside London to possess buildings designed by Vanbrugh. A significant architectural feature is the grouping of all the chimneys into a massive arcade.

The house passed through several generations of the Southwell family until the estate was sold in 1833 to Mr Philip John Miles for £210,000, and became the family seat. During the World War I the House was converted into a hospital though the house continued as a family home until 1935 when, on the death of Philip Napier Miles, it was auctioned and bought by Bristol Municipal Charities and leased to the education authority for use as a school. It later became the Bristol Technical College School of Architecture which later developed into the University of Bath's School of Architecture. In 1970 Bristol Corporation obtained a 50% grant from the Home Office and purchased the House for £305,000 to set up a Police Training Centre for Bristol Constabulary and was used as such until 1995. It was then abandoned for five years and between 2000 and 2012 was leased from Bristol City Council and partially restored as a Business and Conference Centre by local businessman John Hardy. After April 2011 the lease on Kings Weston House was put on the market for £2 million. Following a short period of closure to the public the house was sold to a new leaseholder, local businessman Norman Routledge, in December 2012. Since then the house has been extensively renovated and has opened again as a conference and wedding venue, as well as a communal residence.

It has been designated by Historic England as a Grade I listed building. Buildings in the grounds include a Loggia, Brewhouse and The Echo, which are all Grade I listed in their own right.

The house is surrounded by parkland and an area of woodland bordering the suburbs of Shirehampton, Sea Mills and Lawrence Weston. An iron bridge across Kings Weston Lane connects the estate to that of Blaise Castle.

In April 2011 the Kings Weston Action Group (KWAG) was formed as a volunteer organisation with the ambition to conserve and enhance the Grade II Registered Historic Landscape around the house. The remains of the historic park consists of almost 220 acres split in ownership between Bristol City Council and the National Trust, whose 93 acres of Shirehampton Park are leased to Shirehampton Golf Club. The whole landscape is accessible as either public park or by public footpaths, and includes areas of common land at Penpole Point.

== Archives ==
Documents relating to Kings Weston House and estate, and the families that lived there, are held at Bristol Archives (Refs. 42725) (online catalogue), (Ref. 33746) (online catalogue), (Ref. 44955) (online catalogue) and (Ref. Picbox/6/Port/KW) (online catalogue).

Other records relating to Kings Weston House are held at Gloucestershire Archives.

== Before Vanbrugh ==
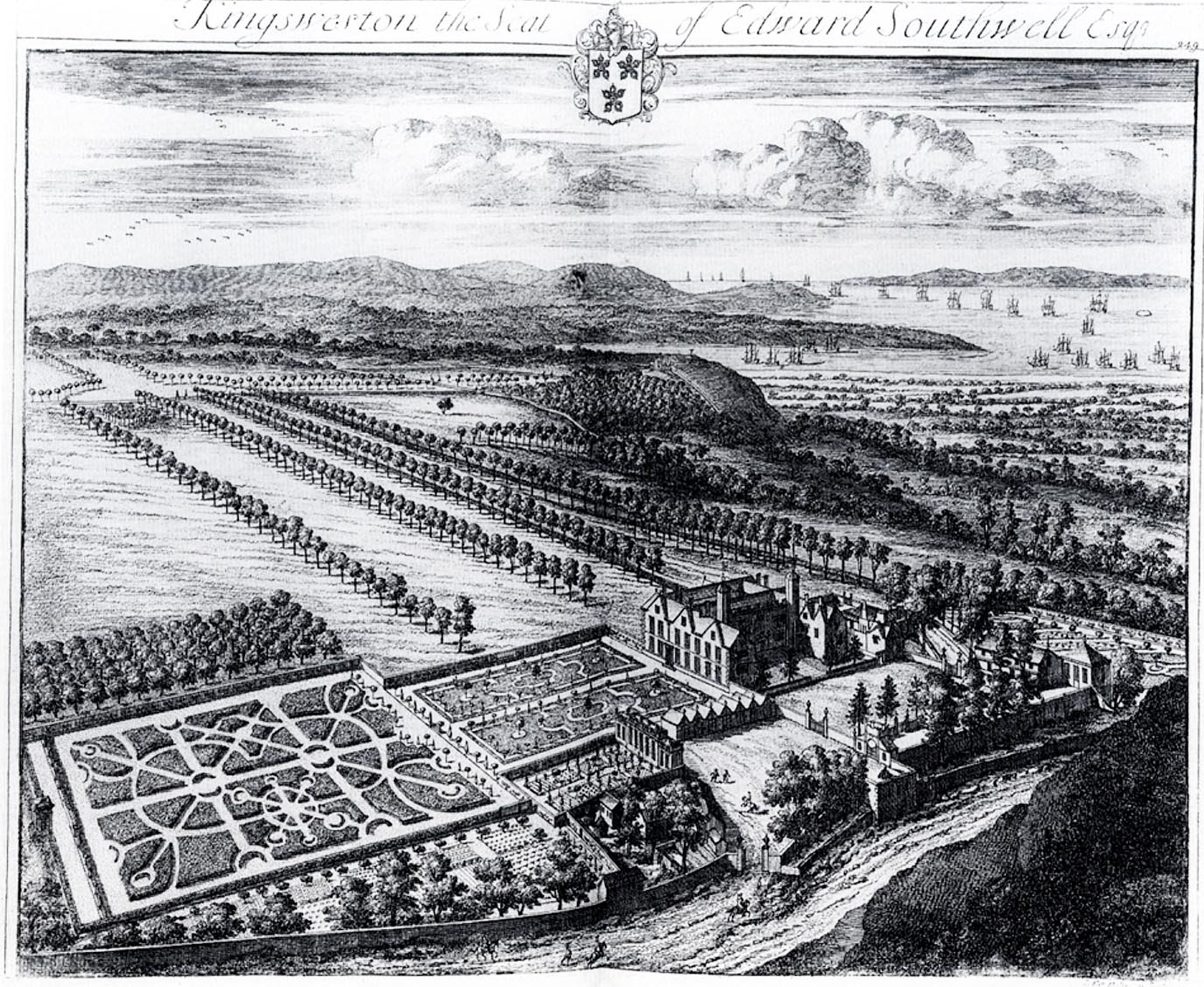
Kip's view of the estate with its previous house

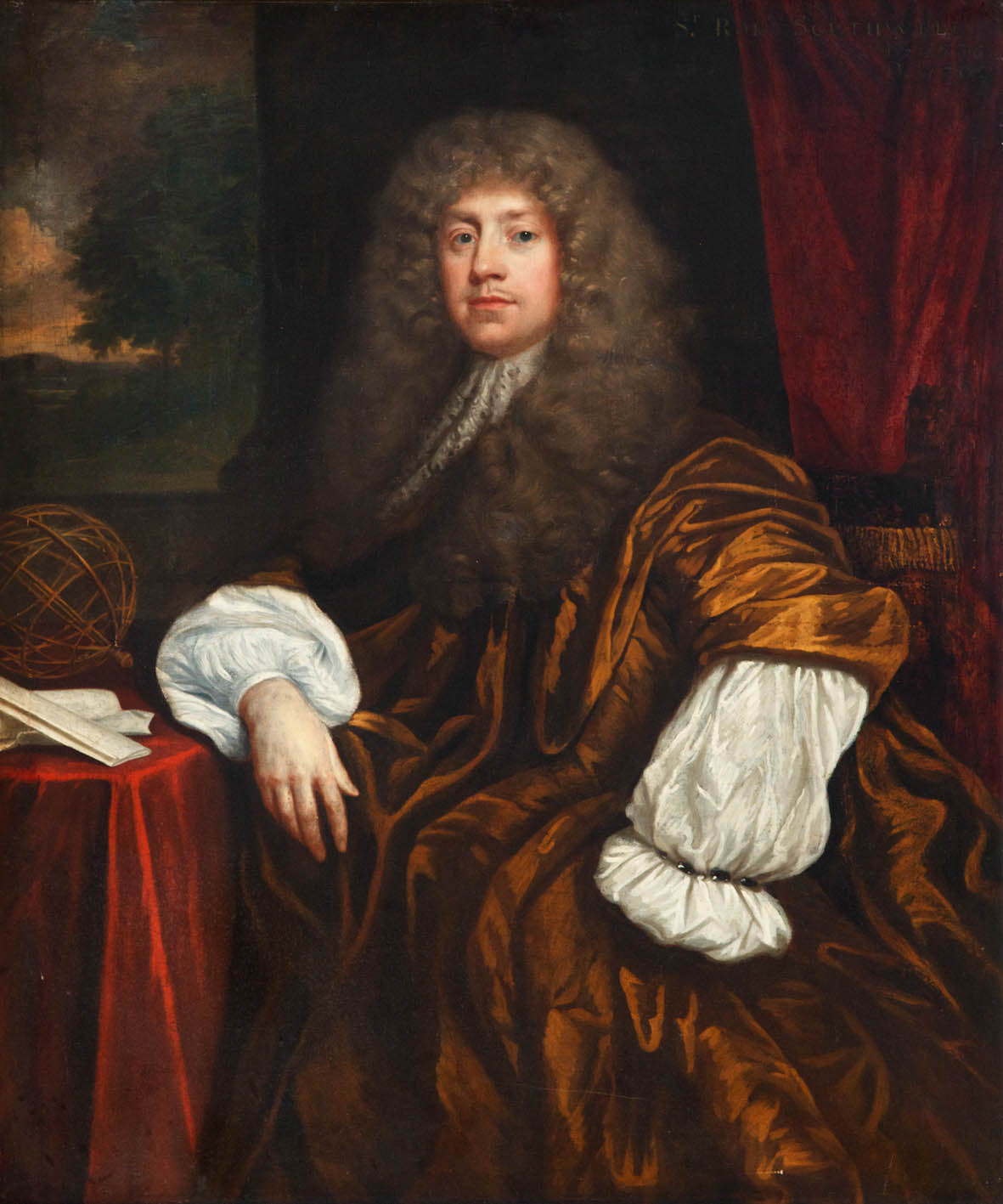
Sir Robert Southwell in a painting by Godfrey Kneller hanging at Kings Weston House

Sir Robert Southwell purchased the Kings Weston estate from Humphrey Hooke, a Bristol merchant, in 1679. In 1712 a birds-eye view of the estate by Johannes Kip was published in Robert Atkyns' The Ancient and Present State of Glostershire. It showed what appears to be a late Tudor house, with a layout similar to that of the current building, having a three-sided entrance court. Vanbrugh later used part of the old foundations in his rebuilding, as well as retaining some of the old walls and a staircase in one of the turrets that were in the angles of the entrance court, though the staircase was later removed. John Vanbrugh's designs for the house (Ref. 33746) (online catalogue) and Johannes Kip's engraving of the house (Ref. 44955) (online catalogue) still exist and are available to the public at Bristol Archives.

The park surrounding the house was extensive. An avenue extended to the southwest, and there were formal parterres to the southeast. The Kip illustration also shows a banqueting house, which survived as a ruin until 1966, when it was destroyed by vandals. An architectural drawing dated 1707 describes it as being 'after the Modell of the Duke of Ormonds at Richmond', and it consisted of two floors, the lower one a workspace and the upper serving as the dining area. Because the building was on a steep slope, both floors were accessible from ground level, and the south façade consisted of a single storey. This south façade was constructed of red rubbing bricks laid in Flemish bond with exceptionally fine jointing, laid with a little less than 1/16 inch of slaked lime putty.

== Current buildings ==
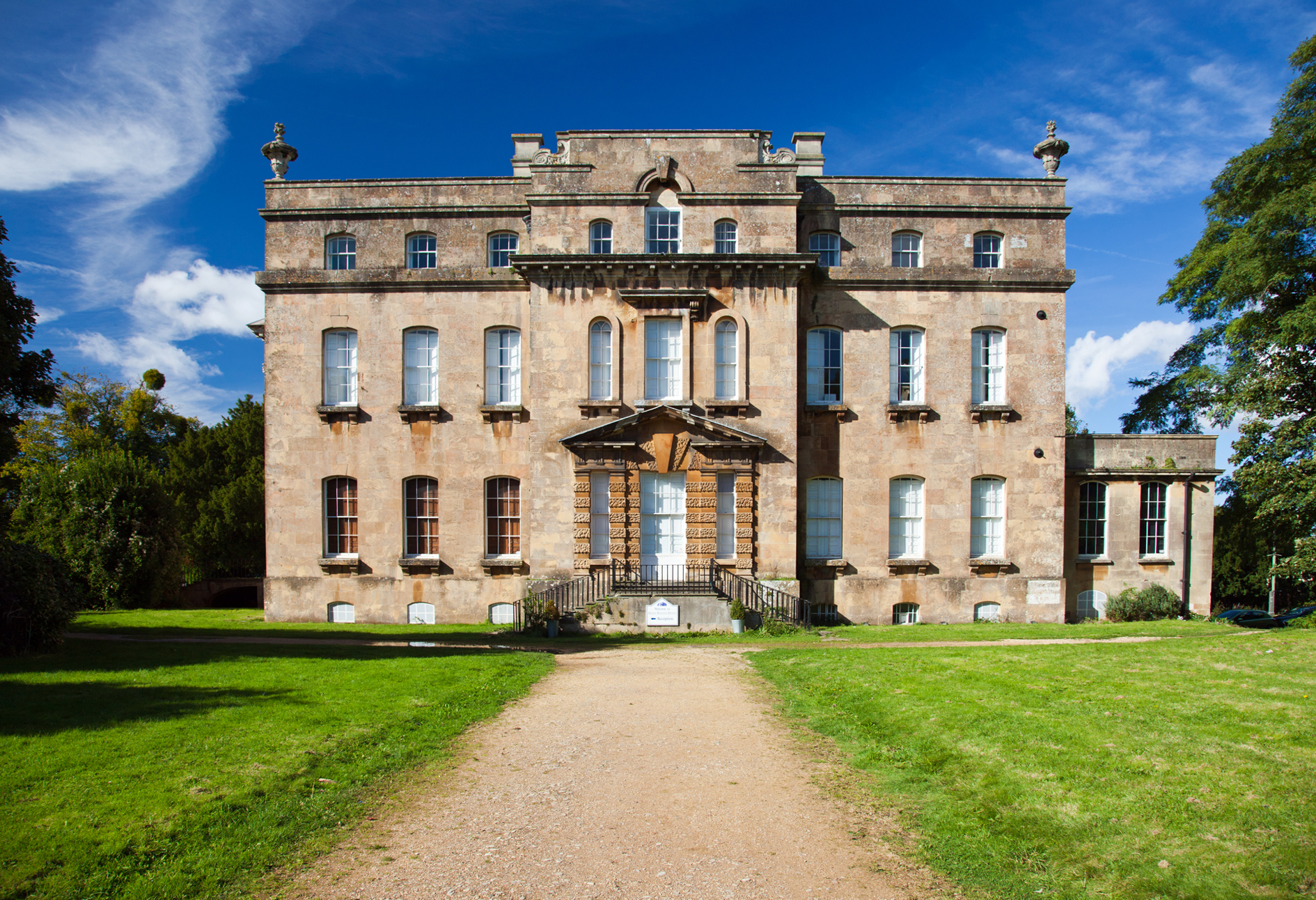
The south east or 'Garden' front

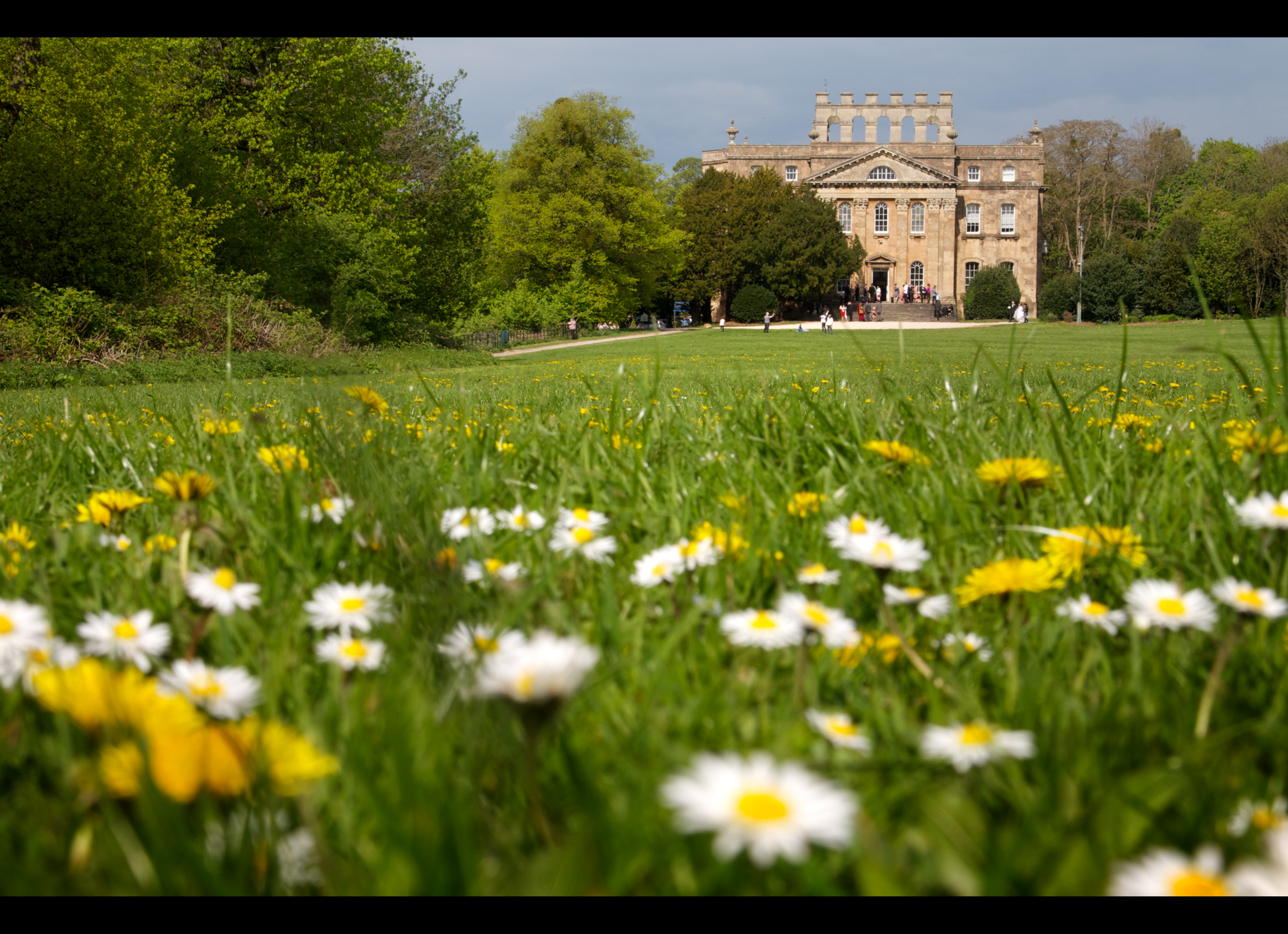
Kings Weston House entrance front across the lawns

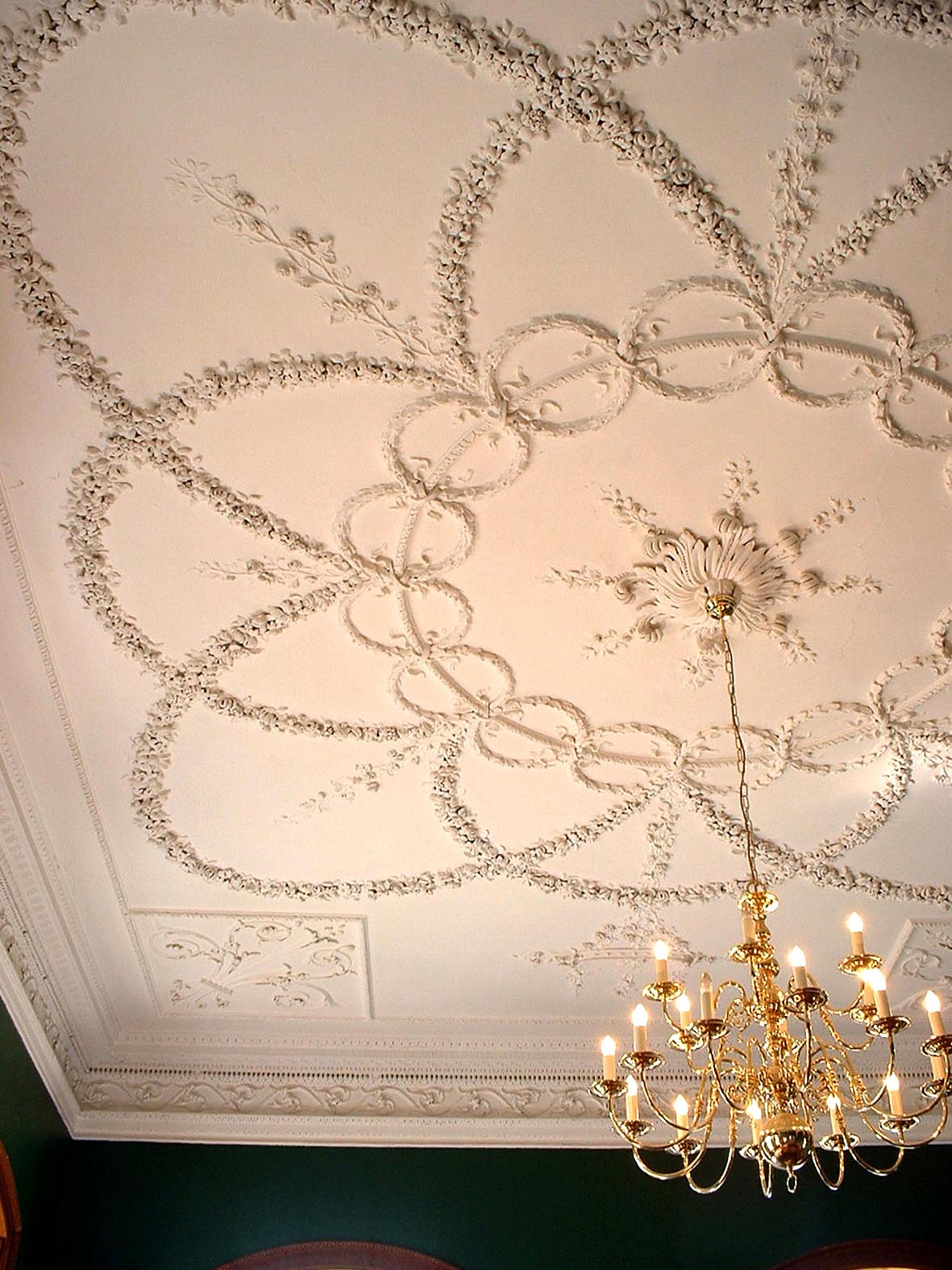
Ceiling of the Parlour at Kings Weston House designed by Robert Mylne and plasterwork executed by Thomas Stocking in the 1760s

On 29 April Edward Southwell wrote in his journal at Kings Weston "Upwards of 60 men preparing stones and digging the foundation of the new house" and on 16 June 1712 work formally began on building the new house by John Vanbrugh. His client, Edward Southwell, did not desire a house on a monumental scale. The result was one of Vanbrugh's smaller houses. It is also his severest in style, obtaining high architectural drama by the well judged disposition of elements that are few in number, and simple in their nature. The exterior of the house would have been at the point of completion in 1717, the date on the contract for one of the parapet vases. The interior would have been virtually complete by 1719, when the design for inlay on the stair landings was drawn up. Two of the facades have since been remodelled, by Robert Mylne, who remodelled the interior in the 1760s. The stone, which was quarried on the site, was originally ochre in colour but has weathered to an orange-pink.

The arcade formed by linking the chimneys, which rises above the roof, is a notable external feature of the building, reminiscent of the belvederes of Blenheim Palace and producing a 'castle air'. It is square in shape and open on the northeast. The current structure is the result of a rebuilding in 1968, using Bath Stone.

The entrance front, on the southwest, has a centre containing six Corinthian pilasters, with those at each side paired to produce three bays, each of which contains a round arched window. The pediment has a central lunette, and each side consists of two bays in which the windows have wide flat surrounds. There are four parapet vases. The steps originally had low flank walls perpendicular to the facade, which were removed in the later remodelling.

On the southeast facade, the centre has a Doric temple front with open pediment, which surrounds the doorway. The centre has an attic as its upper storey, topped by a blocking course with scrolled supports at each end. A design with a pediment was prepared for this front, but is thought never to have been built. Though the only decoration is the rustication on the Doric temple's pilasters, a remarkably rich effect is achieved.

The northeast and northwest facades of Vanbrugh's original design were entirely undecorated, and a consequent lack of popular appeal may be the reason why they were largely destroyed in later remodelling.

Vanbrugh's northwest facade consisted of a single flat surface, in which a Venetian window on each floor filled the central space between two shallow projections. Perhaps to improve the view down to Avonmouth, the centre was remodelled by Mylne with a canted bay window, at odds with the tautness of Vanbrugh's overall design of the house, in which all planes were parallel or perpendicular to the walls. On the northeast the wall was moved forward during nineteenth-century remodelling, destroying an aesthetically significant alignment between wall projections and the break in the roof arcade, which had been present in Vanbrugh's design.

Visitors to the house as it stood after the completion of Vanbrugh's design would have first encountered a huge entrance saloon, two stories high. Beyond this was a stair hall of three storeys in height, with arched openings to the entrance saloon at first-floor height, so that the upper part of the entrance saloon could be seen from within it. These arches were filled in as part of Mylne's remodelling, which though it increased the comfort and charm, reduced the spatial drama. The additional wall space in the entrance saloon was designed to display Southwell's recently inherited collection of ancestral portraits, and Thomas Stocking was employed to execute a scheme of plaster framing for these to Mylne's design. A black and white chequered marble floor and a chimneypiece by John Devall were also added to the entrance saloon at this time.

=== Outbuildings ===
==== Brewhouse ====
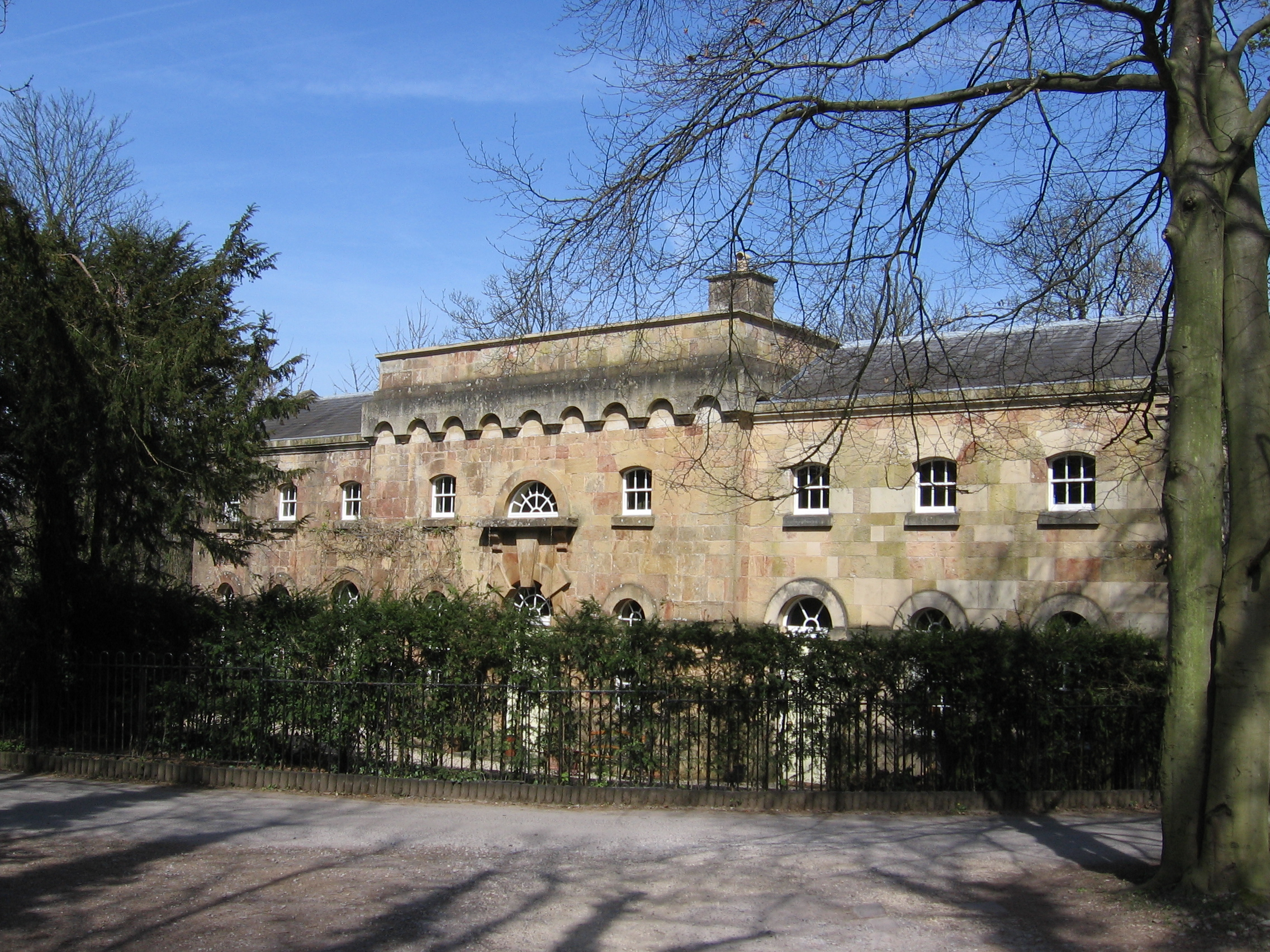
The Brewhouse

The Brewhouse, by Vanbrugh, can be dated, on the grounds that it shows no Palladian influence, to 1718 or earlier. Such features as the huge keystone, set above an arched doorway, and the prominently silled lunette window above, are typical of Vanbrugh's style. The machicolated arcade across the moulded parapet of the centre is a feature unique to Vanbrugh at this date, also found at Vanbrugh Castle, and is a precocious example of the Gothic Revival.

==== The Echo ====
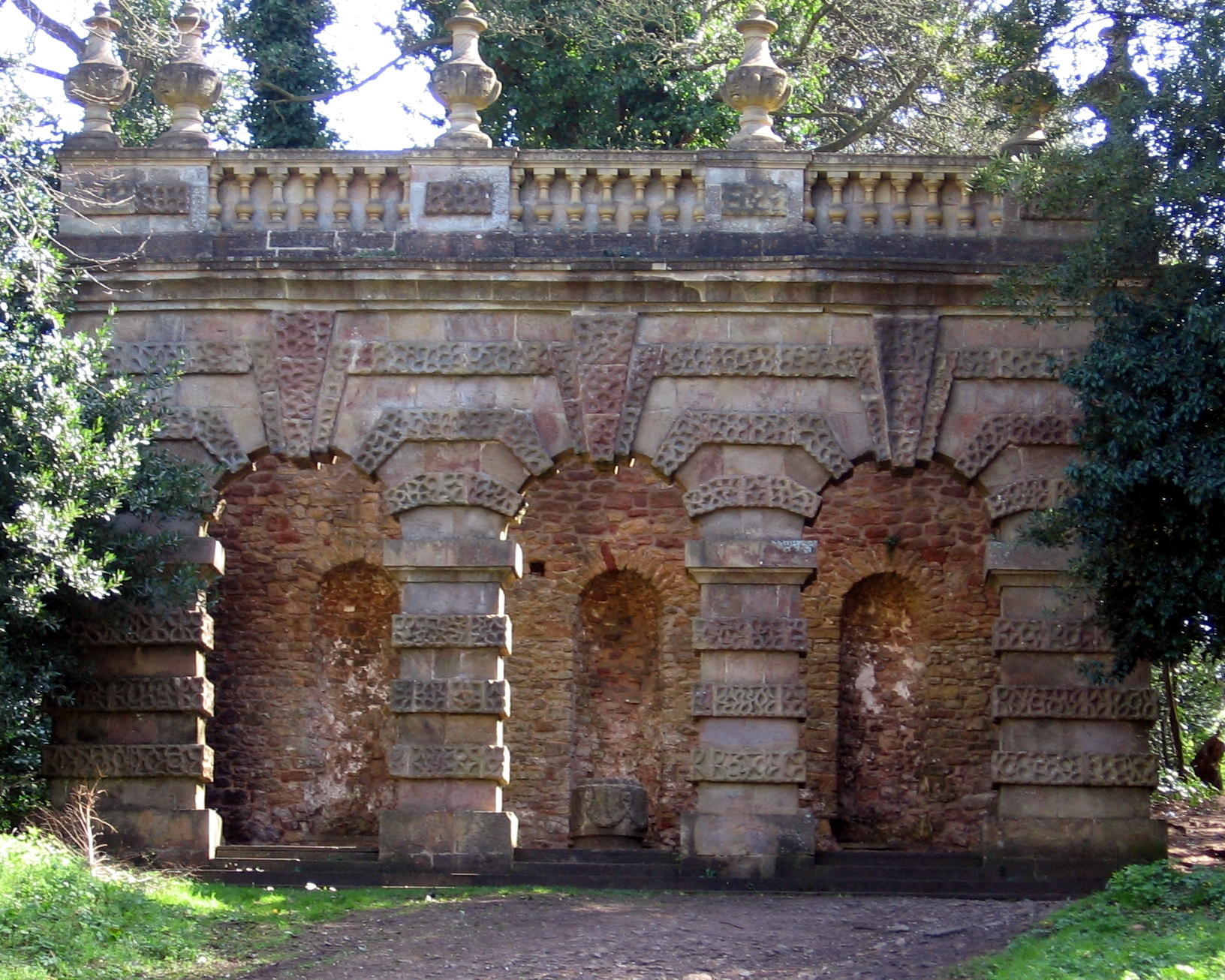
The Echo

The Echo is a loggia at the end of the southeast axis of the building, with a façade of four piers of rusticated stonework, of which alternate courses are projecting and vermiculated. It has large vermiculated keystones at the heads of the three arches. It is attributed to Vanbrugh, its features being almost identical to a Vanbrugh design of 1722 for a single archway.

==== Banqueting loggia ====
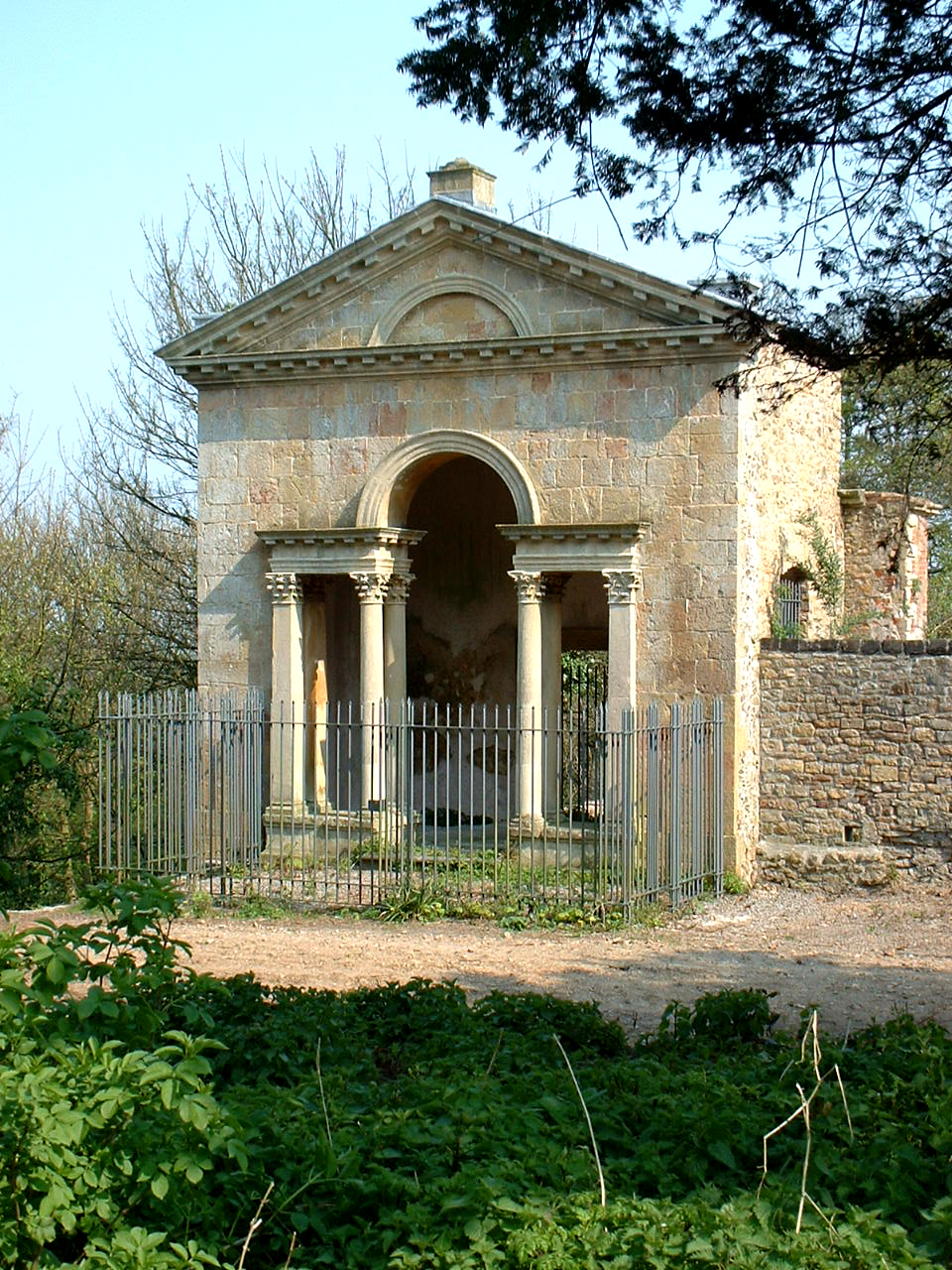
The Loggia before conversion to a private house in 2002

The loggia was added to a pre-existing banqueting house dating from 1705. Vanbrugh's new front turned that axis of the building ninety degrees so it would relate to the main house to the south west and the Great Terrace that provided a long promenade into the woods beyond. Designs for the loggia date to between 1716 and 1720 and drawings of the building exist in both the collections of Bristol Records Office and the Victoria and Albert Museum.

==== Penpole Lodge ====
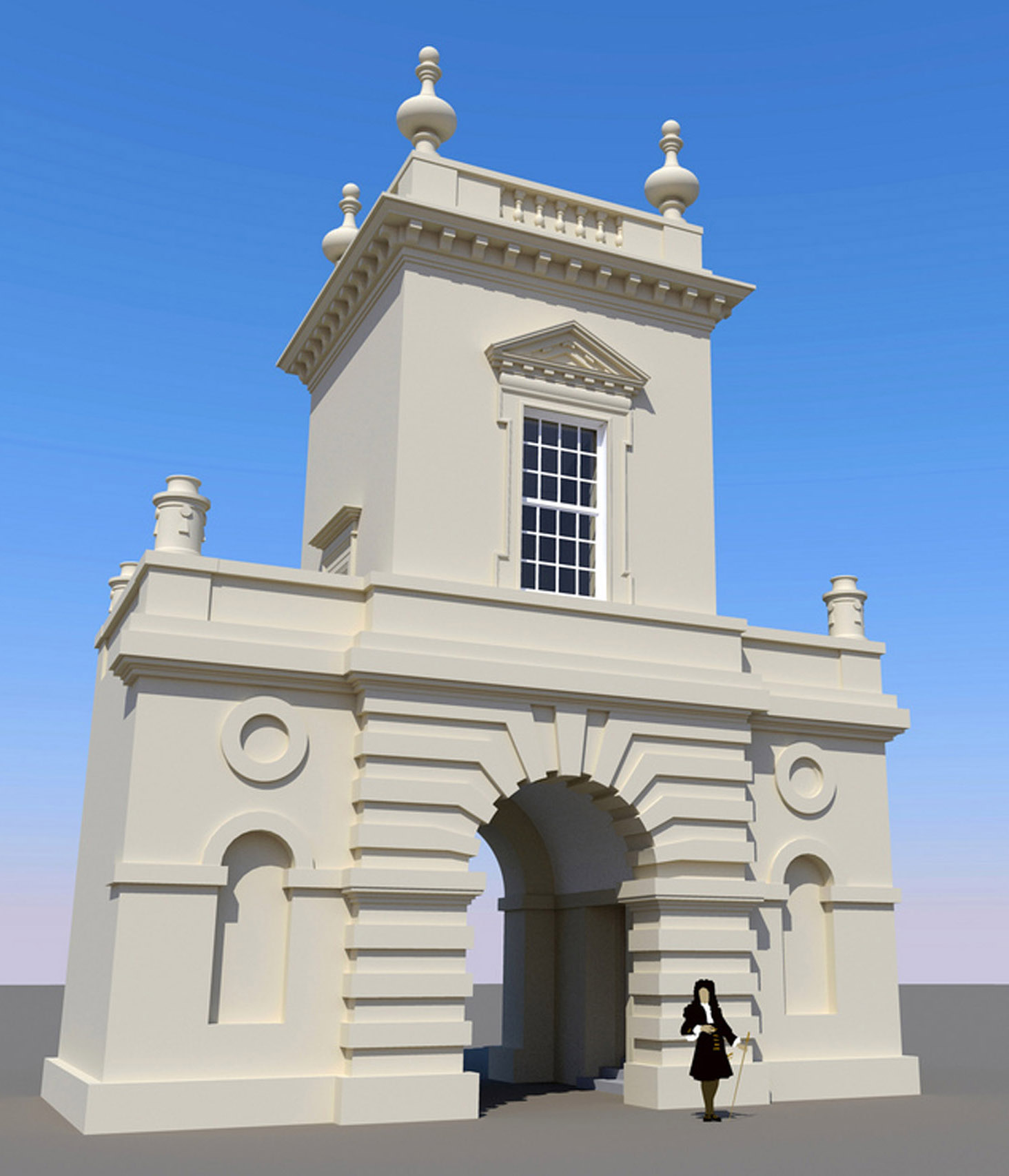
Penpole Lodge by Sir John Vanbrugh circa 1724. 3D reconstruction by the Kings Weston Action Group

Several designs exist for this building which was sited at the far extremity of the Kings Weston estate to the west, and acted as both an eye-catcher from the house and a belvedere to view ships arriving in the Avon and Severn Estuary. Although a design exists attributed to Colen Campbell, it is undoubtedly Vanbrugh's final design that was constructed some time in about 1724. The building took the form of an archway over which was a small room, sometimes referred to as the "Breakfasting room".

After the estate was sold in the 1930s the lodge became derelict and was demolished by Bristol City Council in 1952, though the building was not removed entirely. In 2012 the Kings Weston Action Group cleared the walls and surrounding area so that some idea of the scale of the original building could be obtained.

==== Kingsweston Inn ====
Enough drawings of Kingsweston Inn exist for this building to the south east of the main house to be attributed to Vanbrugh. A series of sketch drawings in Bristol Record Office titled "ale house" compare almost exactly with the built dimensions of the former inn. The inn was heavily rebuilt in the nineteenth century and extended outwards to the south east. The inn closed in the early twentieth century and the building was converted into several houses, a function it continues to perform today.

==== Blacksmith's cottage ====
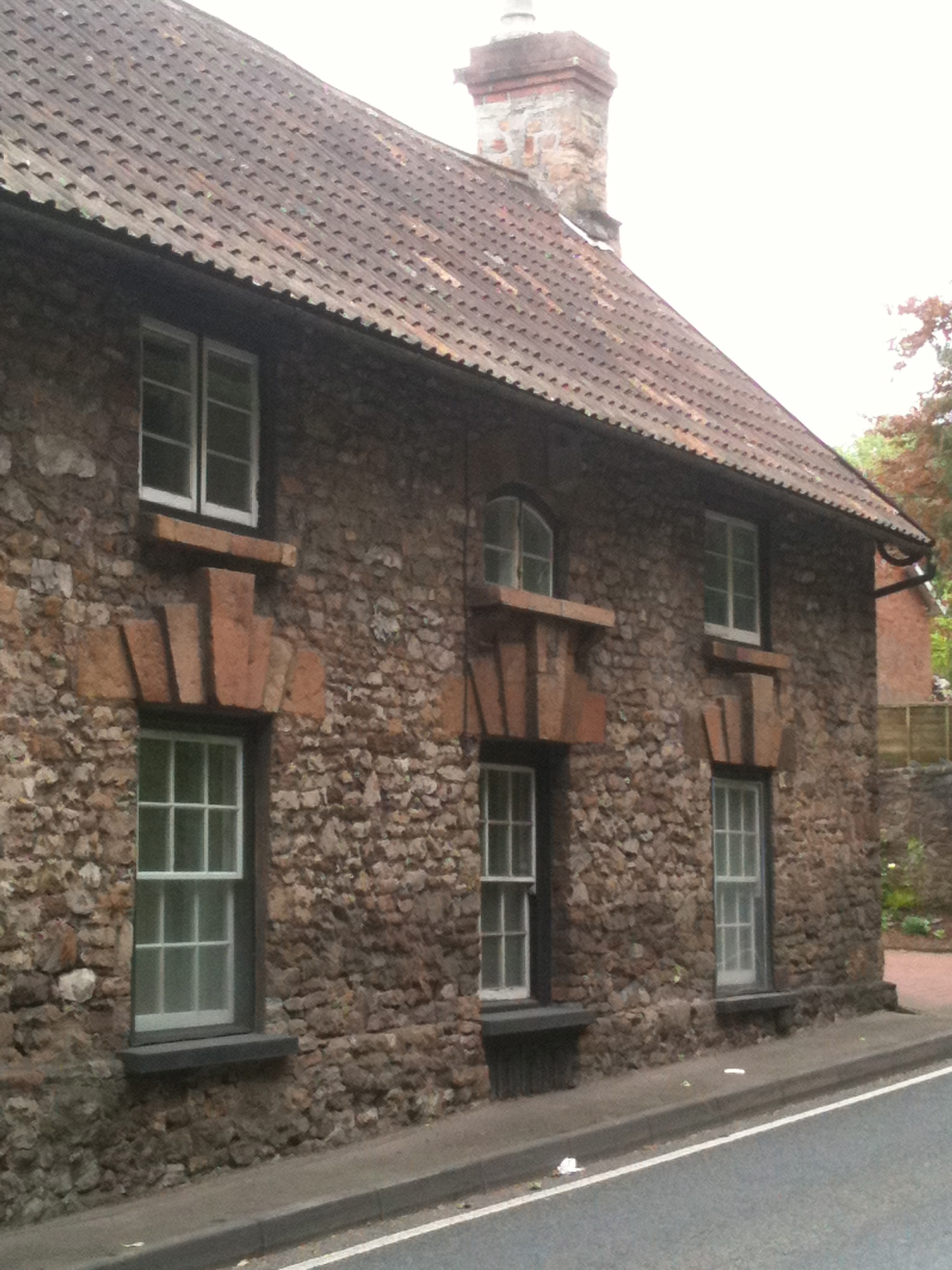
Former Blacksmith's cottage on Kingsweston Lane. Attributed to Vanbrugh

A building on Kingsweston lane bears all the hallmarks of another design by Sir John Vanbrugh though no documentary or illustrative evidence supports this. The building is known to have existed by 1720 and demonstrates a number of characteristic design features employed by Vanbrugh. The building was in use as a blacksmith's forge and cottage in 1772; a use for which the building may have been designed.

==== Stables and Kitchen gardens ====
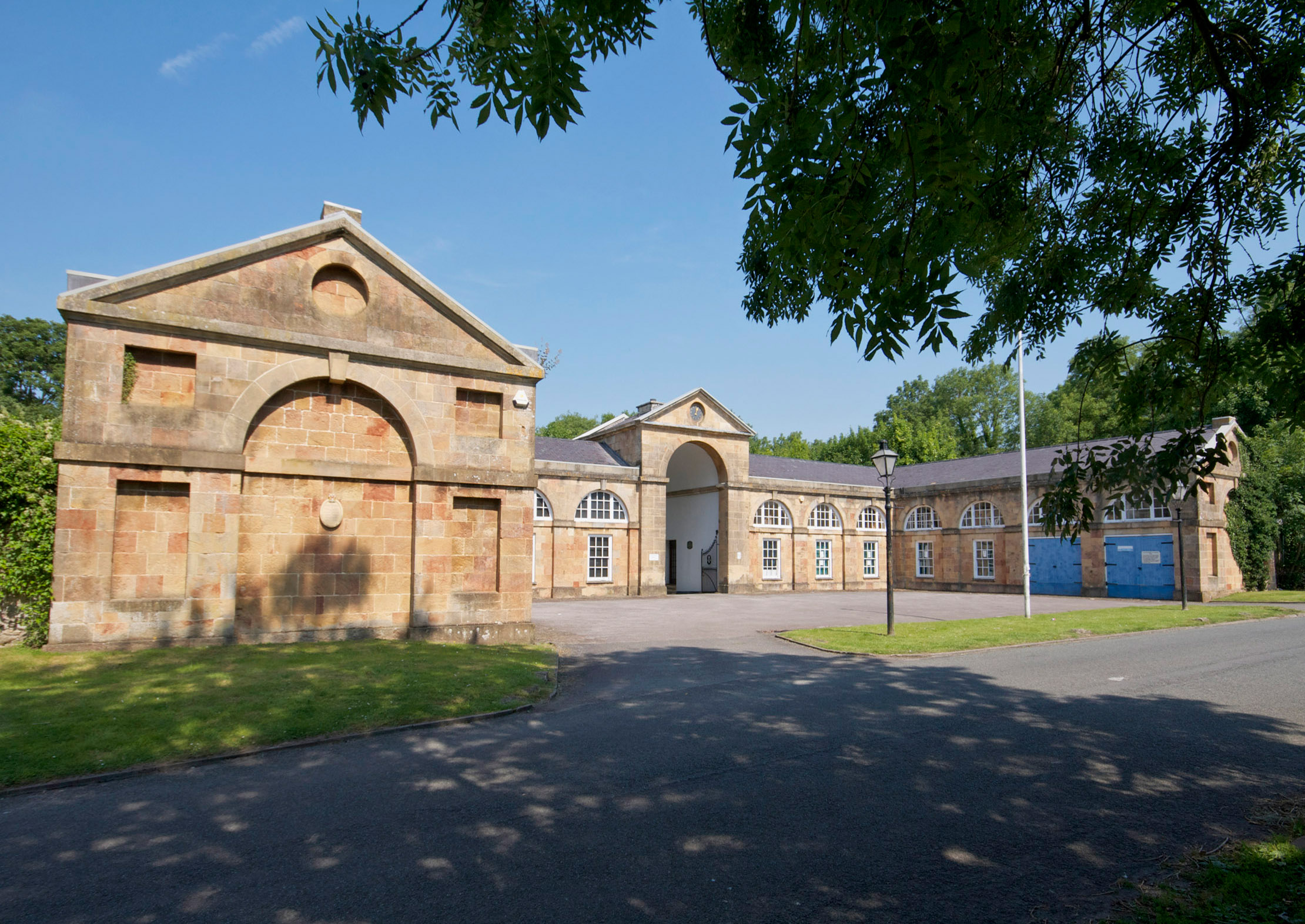
Kings Weston stables designed by Robert Mylne in 1763

The complex of stables and kitchen gardens at Kings Weston were devised by Edward Southwell III who was already making plans whilst on the Grand Tour between 1759 and 1762. Robert Mylne was studying in Rome when Southwell visited and the pair may well have met there prior to Mylne's engagement on the detailed designs for the stable buildings in 1763. The Stables are noted in Mylne's diaries, now held in the Library of the RIBA, as having been begun in 1763. The whole of the extensive matrix of kitchen gardens, stables, accommodation pavilions and a large square pond are executed to a single unified design. The stables are located on the north side of Napier Miles Road and a large glasshouse and yards were laid out either side of them. An ice house was added later.

To the south of the road a series of enclosed walled gardens were laid out surrounding a square pond that replaced an earlier horse pond. The pond was partially ornamental, but served a variety of practical uses including the keeping of fish, provision of a constant water supply to the gardens and ice in the winter, and the washing of horses and carriages by means of access ramps to water level.

In 1938 the House in the Garden was built at the centre of the walled gardens for the widowed Sybil Miles (née Gonne) when Kings Weston House and much of the estate were sold. The house and walled gardens south of the road are now part of Kingsweston Special School. After a protracted period of decay the stables were proposed for demolition in 1958. After a local campaign they were saved and Bristol Constabulary rebuilt them to create a police station which opened in 1960.

In 1954 the medieval Bewys Cross was moved from its location north of Napier Miles Road to a new position beside the pond. The cross is thought to have been brought to the Kings Weston estate from its original location close to the mouth of the Avon in the nineteenth century.

The stables and pavilions are an early example of neo-classical architecture and are particularly important in the context of the city of Bristol. The walled gardens and pavilions, and the ice house are on the Heritage at Risk Register whilst the stables have been converted to houses.

==== Shirehampton Lodge ====
There are five of the original six lodges remaining at the entrance points onto the Kings Weston Estate: Henbury Lodge, Park Lodge, Home Lodge, Wood Lodge, and Shirehampton Lodge. Penpole Lodge was demolished in 1952. All the remaining lodges are Grade II listed.

Of the remaining five lodges, Shirehampton Lodge on Park Hill is the most architecturally ambitious, and can be attributed to Robert Mylne who worked elsewhere on the estate for the Southwell family. The building has a portico carried on four Roman Doric columns, and a gate once closed off Park Hill before it. Although there are no specific mentions to the lodge in Mylne's diary, it may be the "lodge and tea room" mentioned as his last design work at Kings Weston in 1768 which he "made a gift" of to Edward Southwell. Shirehampton Lodge strongly resembles similar buildings designed by Mylne as bridge-keeper's lodges on the Gloucester and Sharpness Canal.

== The Estate ==
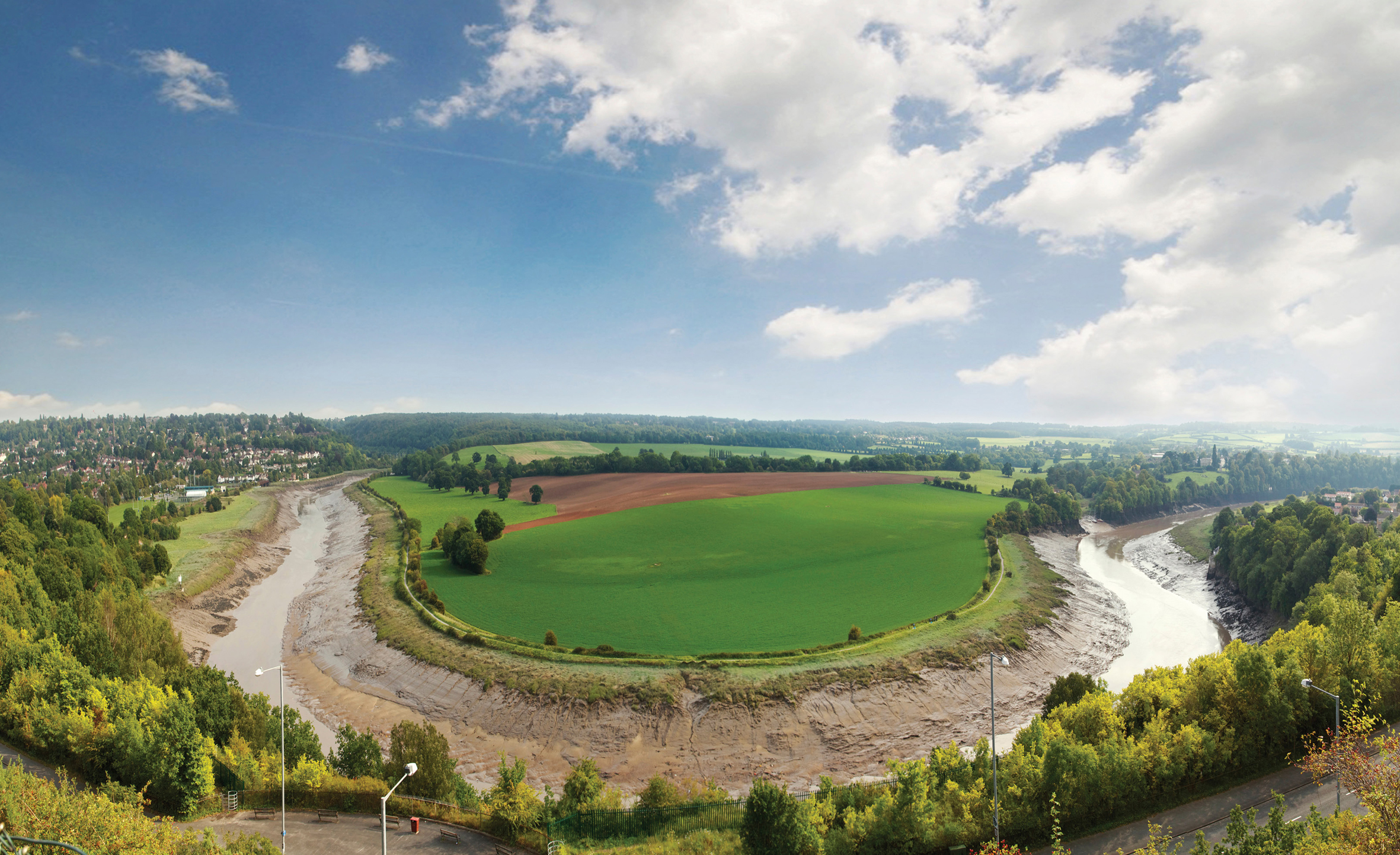
View south across the Bristol Avon from the Shirehampton Park area of the Kings Weston Estate

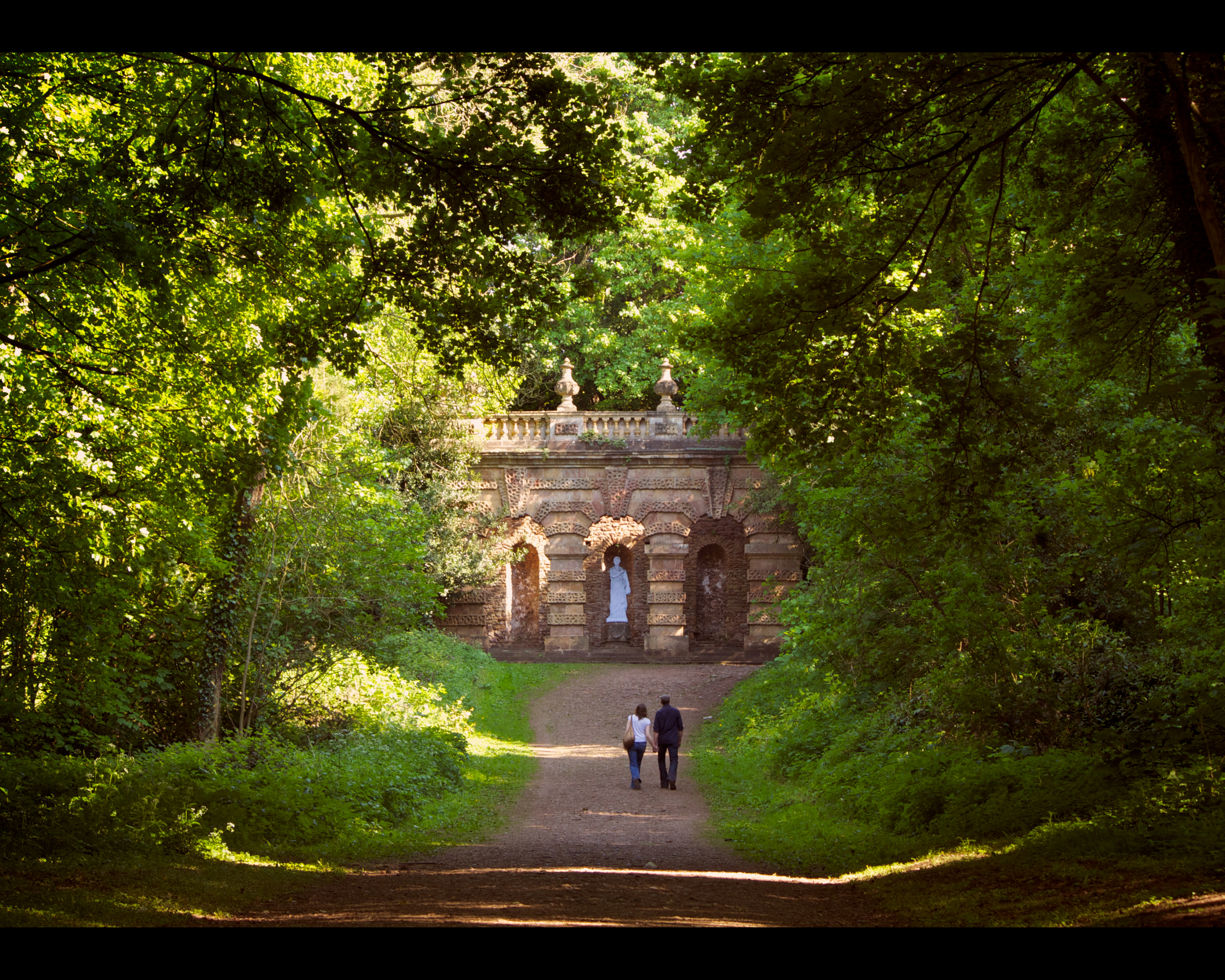
View of Vanbrugh's Echo pavilion, showing a temporary replica of the lost statue at the centre

The Kings Weston Estate is a Registered Historic Landscape and is protected with a Grade II listing on the Register of Historic Parks and Gardens of special historic interest in England. Parts of the landscape lie within the Kingsweston and Trym Valley Conservation Areas defined by Bristol City Council.

Much of the landscaped parkland around Kings Weston House remains open and is accessible by the public. 220 acres around the house including Penpole Wood and the Home Park are in the ownership of Bristol City Council, whilst a further 90 acres including the Shirehampton Park portion of the estate is owned by the National Trust.

The landscaped grounds were developed during the seventeenth century following the purchase of the manor by Sir Robert Southwell in 1679. Robert keenly redesigned the formal gardens with the assistance of John Evelyn, including the creation of parterre and 'wilderness' gardens, formal avenues and the laying out of drives through the woodland. Robert's son Edward continued working on the landscape setting to the house following the completion of the new building in about 1720. Bristol Record Office holds a series of drawings illustrating projects to enhance the gardens. This included the construction of Penpole Lodge, the removal of thirty feet of hillside from Kingsweston Hill, and several projects for "Longcombe". The latter show that Edward Southwell was extending the designed landscape southwards to cover the area now known as Shirehampton Park.

Thomas Wright is recorded as having been engaged in redesigning the landscape in conjunction with Edward Southwell III immediately on the return of the latter to England from the Grand Tour in 1762. Letters now lodged at Bristol Record Office detail a close friendship between Wright and his client.

In a journal entry in 1783 John Wesley described "Lord Clifford's woods at King's Weston" as "amazingly beautiful: I have seen nothing equal to them in the West of England, and very few in other parts". After a subsequent visit he noted the house to be "one of the most beautiful I ever saw ... the prospect is fine every way commanding both the land and the water". By the turn of the nineteenth century the estate was nationally famous for what a contemporary guide to the seats of the gentry called its "exquisitely beautiful and uncommonly extensive" prospect northwards across the Severn Estuary to Wales, and southwards over the River Avon towards the Avon Gorge and Bristol. It formed the climax of well-published rides from fashionable resorts such as Bath, Clifton and Hotwells returning across Kingsweston Hill, Blaise Castle Estate and Westbury on Trym. Jane Austen has characters of hers talk of excursions to the estate in her novels Northanger Abbey and Emma (but in both cases those characters are generally depicted as foolish by the author). It also became a popular destination for artists of the Romantic Movement, attracting the likes of James Muller, Francis Danby and Nicholas Pocock. Poets including Robert Southey and Walter Savage Landor also visited, and wrote about the spectacle of the distant views of Wales from Kingsweston Hill and Penpole Point.

Much of the former charm of Kings Weston has since been overshadowed by the development of the industrial suburb of Avonmouth to the north and the construction of the Lawrence Weston housing estate in the years following the Second World War. Further decay has resulted from the loss of views through lack of regular maintenance, allowing self-seeded trees and shrubs to invade formerly open slopes. However the Shirehampton Park section of the estate has fared better, with the views towards the Avon Gorge remaining unobstructed.

== Kings Weston Action Group ==
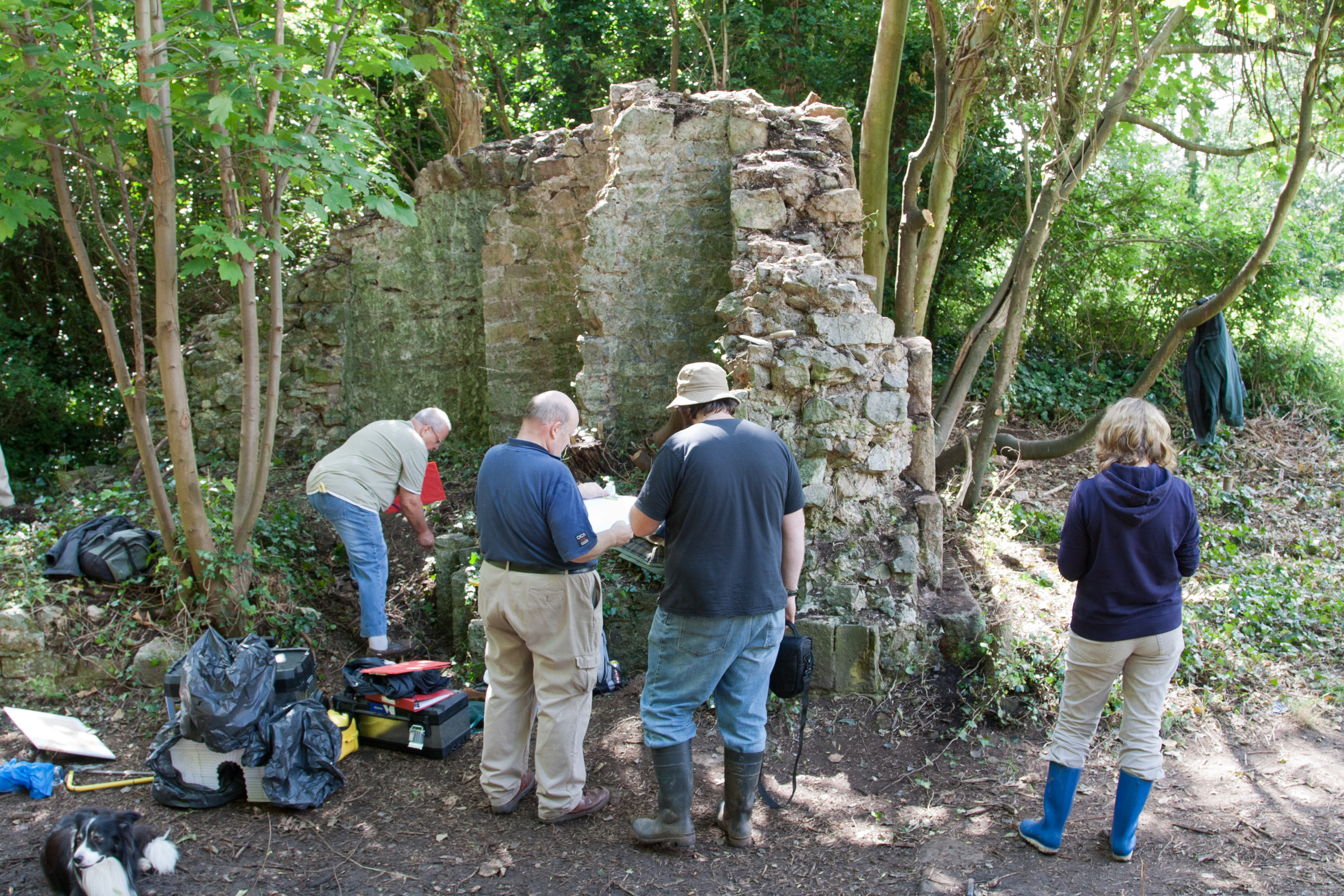
Volunteers of the Kings Weston Action Group record the ruins of Penpole Lodge on the Kings Weston estate

The Kings Weston Action Group or KWAG is a volunteer organisation established in April 2011 and focussed on the promotion, conservation and enhancement of the historic former parkland surrounding Kings Weston House in North Bristol.

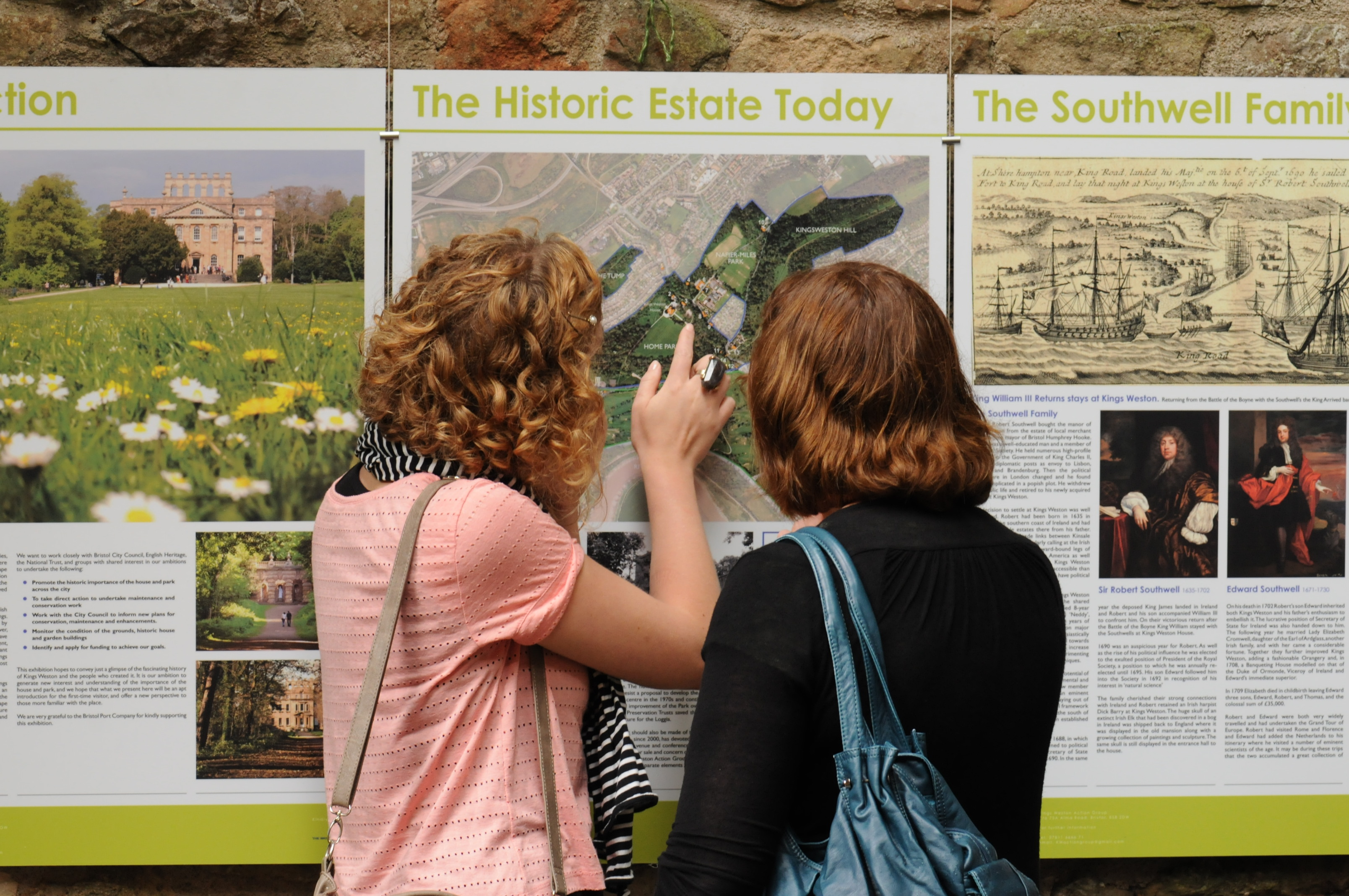
An exhibition of the history of the Kings Weston estate held in the Echo in September 2011

The Kings Weston Action Group was set up to "protect the Kings Weston Estate and House, fight for its future, and protect its past". It was formed by a group of volunteers formed from local people, users of the parkland, and professionals interested in the conservation of the Grade II-registered historic landscape park and the Grade I listed house. The group was established after the announcement of the sale of the Grade I-listed house and the recognition that the condition of the landscaped grounds in the ownership of Bristol City Council were in an advanced state of decay and in urgent need of conservation.

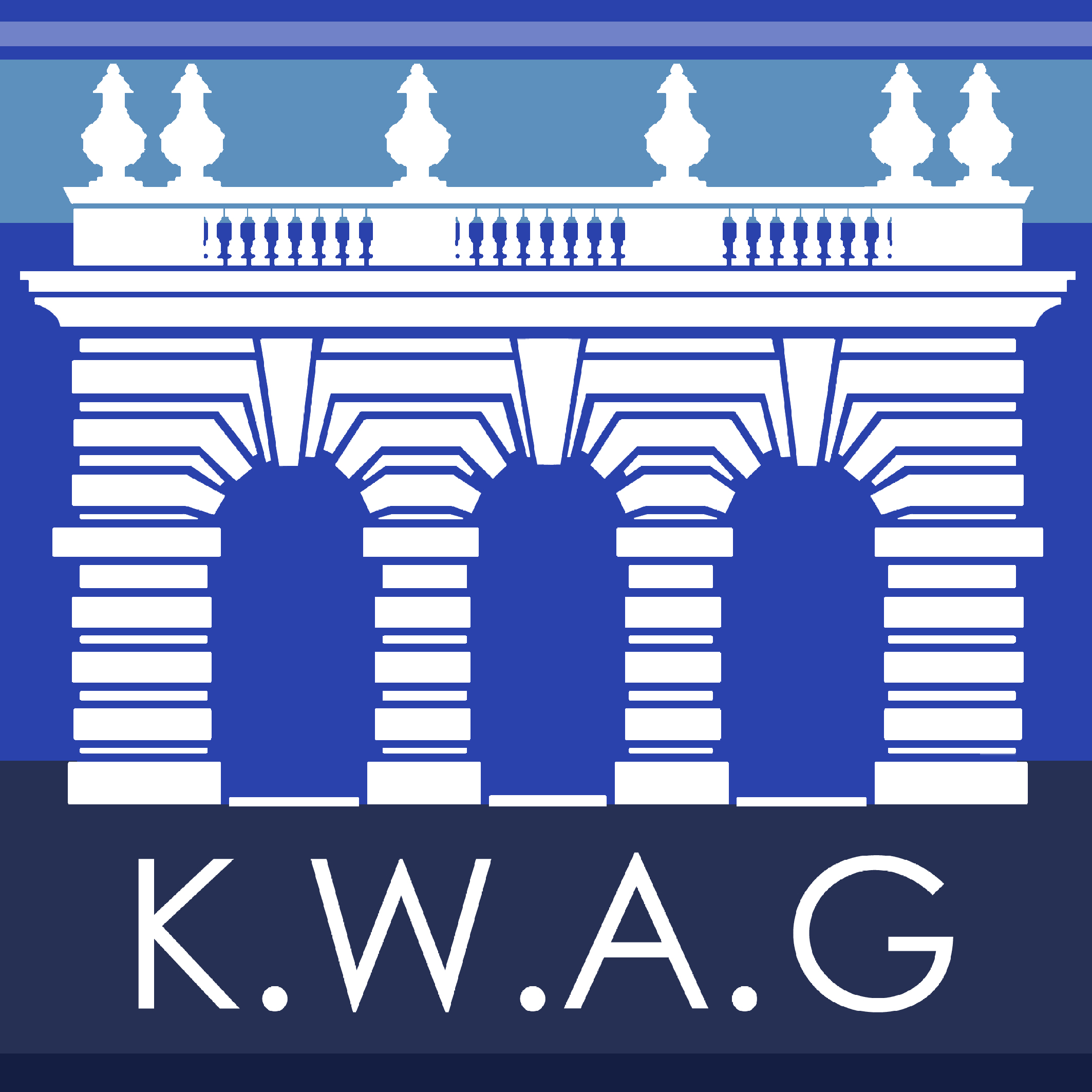
Logo of the Kings Weston Action Group (KWAG), utilising the outline of 'The Echo', a pavilion designed by Sir John Vanbrugh

The group's objectives were initially stated as to lobby the City Council to engineer a conservation and management plan for the estate, to monitor the Grade I-listed house and garden buildings, and to source funding to develop the grounds into a first-class green space for everyone to enjoy. A new conservation plan was commissioned by the City Council following pressure from the Kings Weston Action Group and was supported by a grant from the Bristol Buildings Preservation Trust in October 2011.

KWAG was launched in spring 2011 with an appeal for information that could lead to the recovery of a lost statue, and it has since put on a number of exhibitions, learning events and campaigns. Since January 2012, it has also run regular monthly working party events focussed on taking direct action to help conserve the estate with the support of Bristol City Council and the National Trust.

KWAG has produced exhibition material based on its discoveries. Additional information was published in the form of a walking guide to promote the estate in 2012, which was launched at one of the group's regular walking tours.

Several archaeology projects have been undertaken by the group with the input of volunteers, including a geophysical survey in conjunction with the University of Bristol and the recording of the ruins of Penpole Lodge, a lost building by Sir John Vanbrugh, in conjunction with officers from South Gloucestershire Council.

== See also ==
- Grade I listed buildings in Bristol

== Sources ==
- Foyle, Andrew (2004). Bristol. Pevsner Architectural Guides. New Haven and London: Yale University Press.
- Gomme, Andor; Jenner, Michael; Little, Bryan (1979). Bristol: an architectural history. London: Lund Humphries in association with Bristol & West Building Society.
