= Bewys Cross =

Monument in Avonmouth, England

Coordinates: 51.49523°N 2.65872°W

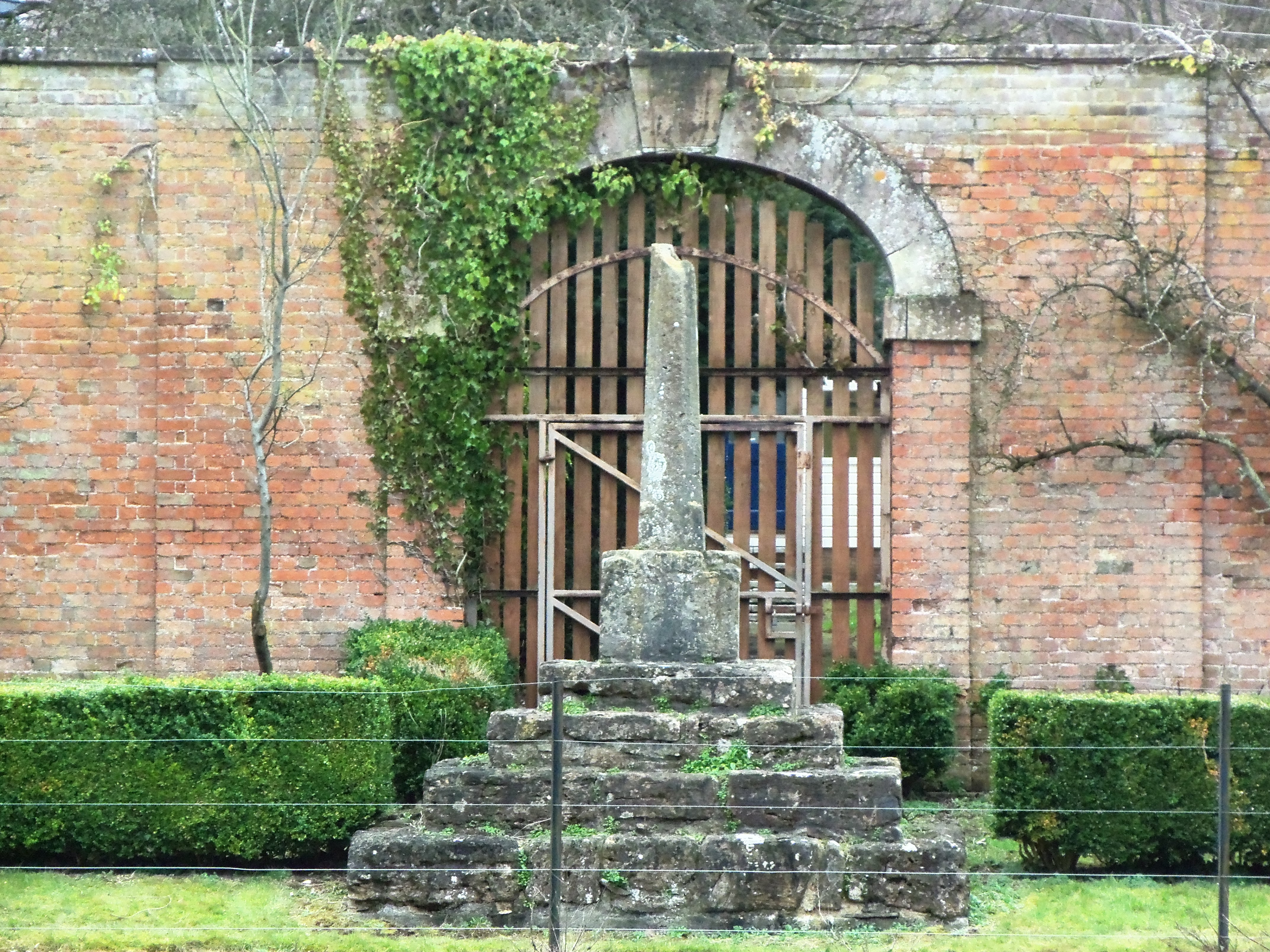
Bewys Cross in its present location at Kingsweston

Bewys Cross (or Bewy's Cross) is a monument consisting of the steps, plinth and truncated shaft said to be of an ancient cross of uncertain age which used to stand on the ancient seabank or seawall of the River Severn in that area of Shirehampton in Gloucestershire, United Kingdom, now known as Avonmouth. The cross is perhaps early fifteenth century; the steps may be more recent.

The site is marked as "Bevis's Cross" on a map of 1769 and as "Bevis Stone" on one of 1772, close to where the River Avon used to flow into the Severn, about halfway between the sites of the later Avonmouth and Marine Hotels (which have both since been demolished). Its position is now in the middle of the Royal Edward Dock, Avonmouth. Since the 1870s, the Avon has flowed into the Severn about half a mile further south.

== Purpose ==
The purpose of the cross seems most likely to have been to mark the old mouth of the Avon, the access to the port of Bristol, for the benefit of sailors approaching from the south and turning upriver north of the now vanished Dumball Island. Local tradition has it that sailors used it to show their gratitude to God for their safe return by leaving donations for the Church, and there is a hole in one of the steps which is said to have received their coins.

The origin of the name is uncertain. There is a Bevis Cross in Wisbech, Cambridgeshire, which may be relevant because of the similar name. There may be an echo in both cross-names of the medieval legendary hero Sir Bevis of Hampton, and it may or may not be a coincidence that the site of Bewys Cross was in the tithing of Shirehampton, which was in early medieval times called simply Hampton. There is a mention in 1551 of a place called Bewehurste at Compton in the nearby parish of Almondsbury, which is of uncertain relevance. The current name might result from confusion with Bewell's Cross in Bristol, or the Compton name.

== Location ==
Reputedly the local "squires", the Miles family, had the cross moved from the riverbank and re-erected in Kingsweston Lane, nearly opposite the entrance to their mansion, King's Weston House, probably at some time between 1863 and 1868. However, the cross appears in the garden location in an estate survey of 1772 and is more likely to have been moved by the Southwell family who owned the estate in the Eighteenth Century. This likely followed a trend set by Henry Hoare for setting up ancient artefacts as garden ornaments, and at Kings Weston had additional symbolism in marking the supposed site of an ancient chapel. In 1952 or 1954, the subsequent owners of the Kingsweston estate, Bristol City Council, moved the cross to the grounds of The House in the Garden, a nearby house which had been built in 1938 for the widow of the last squire. It still stands there by the fishpond.
