= Southwell Gift Houses =

Almshouse

Location
- Location: The Mall, Kinsale, County Cork, Ireland

Architecture
- Founder: Sir Robert Southwell
- Completed: 1682

Southwell Gift Houses are 17th-century almshouses in Kinsale. They are four houses for the pensioners and a supervisors house within a compound overlooking the town.

== House ==
Sir Robert Southwell built the almshouses in 1682. He was a prominent benefactor of Kinsale, diplomat, ambassador and politician who died in 1702. The original plan was to give the houses to widows of Protestant tradesmen. From 1965 to 1970 the houses were restored and given to elderly people of Kinsale.

There are two parts to the structure. The main supervisor's house is a simple, three-bay two-storey house of modest size and the four smaller cottages are semi detached, three-bay single-storey with dormer attic houses with pitched slate roofs and red brick chimney stacks set around a courtyard. The entrance is a wrought-iron gate with gate piers. Unfortunately there was no money left in the endowment by 2015 and the houses were put for sale on behalf of the Church of Ireland, Bishop of Cork, Cloyne and Ross due to the need to completely restore the buildings. The houses are listed and protected.
