= Vayeshev =

Ninth portion in the annual Jewish cycle of weekly Torah reading

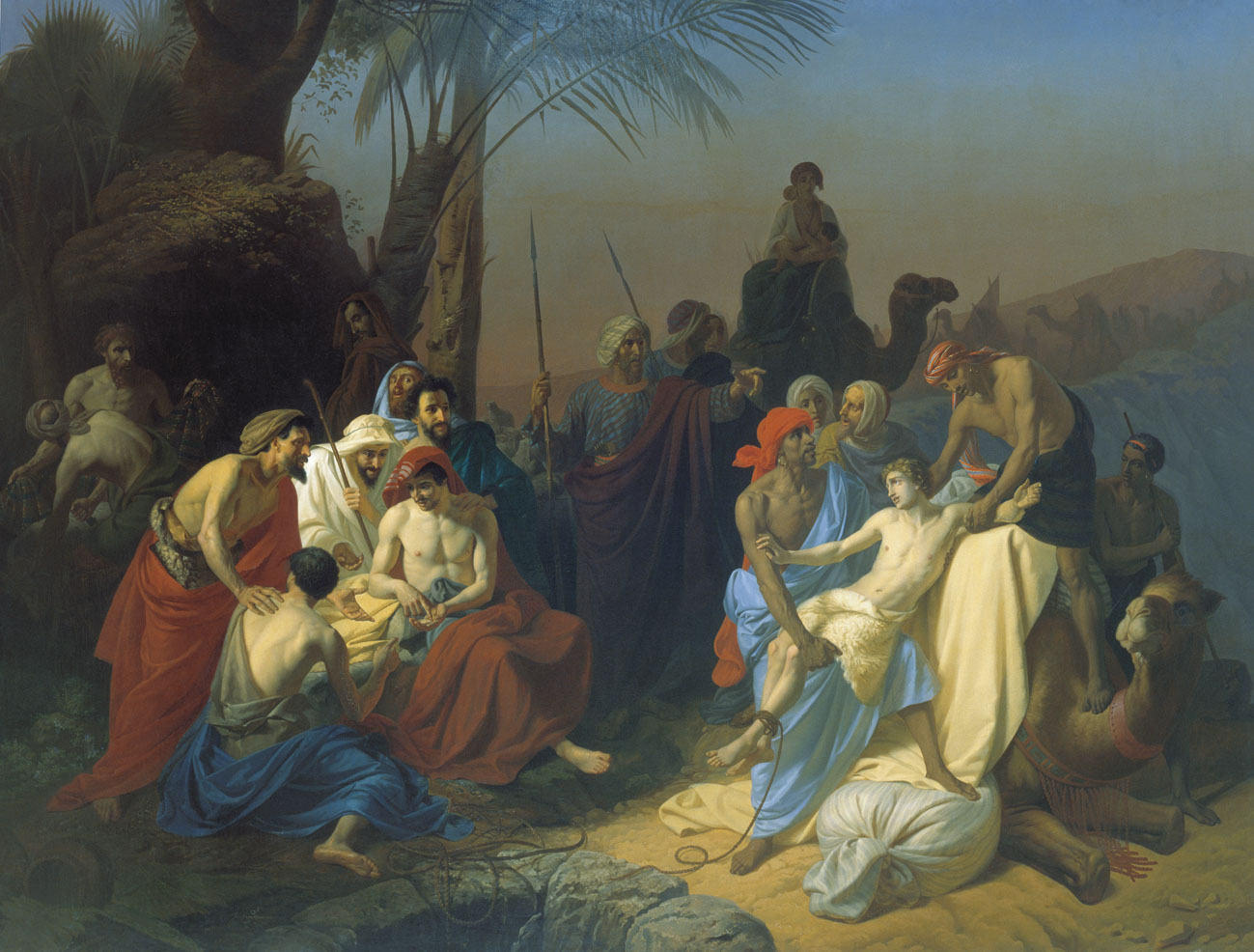
Joseph's Brothers Sell Him into Captivity (1855 painting by Konstantin Flavitsky)

Vayeshev, Vayeishev, or Vayesheb (וַיֵּשֶׁב—Hebrew for "and he lived," the first word of the parashah) is the ninth weekly Torah portion (פָּרָשָׁה, parashah) in the annual Jewish cycle of Torah reading. The parashah constitutes Genesis 37:1–40:23. The parashah tells the stories of how Jacob's other sons sold Joseph into captivity in Egypt, how Judah wronged his daughter-in-law Tamar who then tricked him into fulfilling his oath, and how Joseph served Potiphar and was imprisoned when falsely accused of assaulting Potiphar's wife.

The parashah is made up of 5,972 Hebrew letters, 1,558 Hebrew words, 112 verses, and 190 lines in a Torah Scroll (סֵפֶר תּוֹרָה, Sefer Torah). Jews read it on the ninth Sabbath after Simchat Torah, in late November or December.

== Readings ==
In traditional Sabbath Torah reading, the parashah is divided into seven readings, or עליות, aliyot. In the Masoretic Text of the Tanakh (Hebrew Bible), Parashat Vayeshev has three "open portion" (פתוחה, petuchah) divisions (roughly equivalent to paragraphs, often abbreviated with the Hebrew letter פ (peh)). Parashat Vayeshev has one further subdivision, called a "closed portion" (סתומה, setumah) division (abbreviated with the Hebrew letter ס (samekh)) within the second open portion. The first open portion spans the first three readings. The second open portion spans the fourth through sixth readings. And the third open portion coincides with the seventh reading. The single closed portion division sets off the fourth reading from the fifth reading.

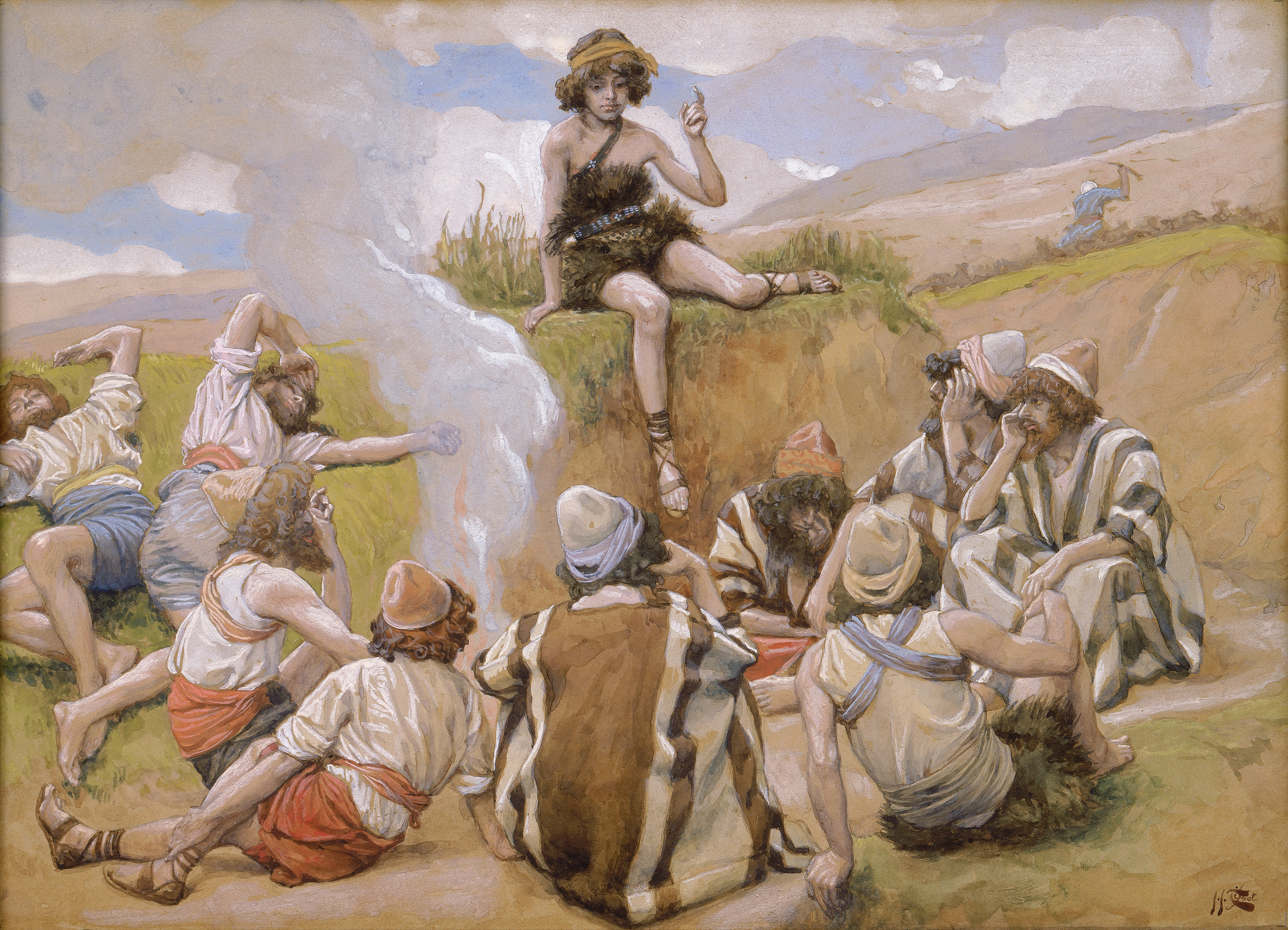
Joseph Reveals His Dream to His Brethren (watercolor circa 1896–1902 by James Tissot)

=== First reading—Genesis 37:1–11 ===
In the first reading, Jacob lived in the land of Canaan, and this is his family's story. When Joseph was 17, he fed the flock with his brothers, and he brought Jacob an evil report about his brothers. Because Joseph was the son of Jacob's old age, Jacob loved him more than his other children, and Jacob made him a coat of many colors, which caused Joseph's brothers to hate him. And Joseph made his brothers hate him more when he told them that he dreamed that they were binding sheaves in the field, and their sheaves bowed down to his sheaf. He told his brothers another dream, in which the sun, the moon, and eleven stars bowed down to him, and when he told his father, Jacob rebuked him, asking whether he, Joseph's mother, and his brothers would bow down to Joseph. Joseph's brothers envied him, but Jacob kept what he said in mind. The first reading ends here.

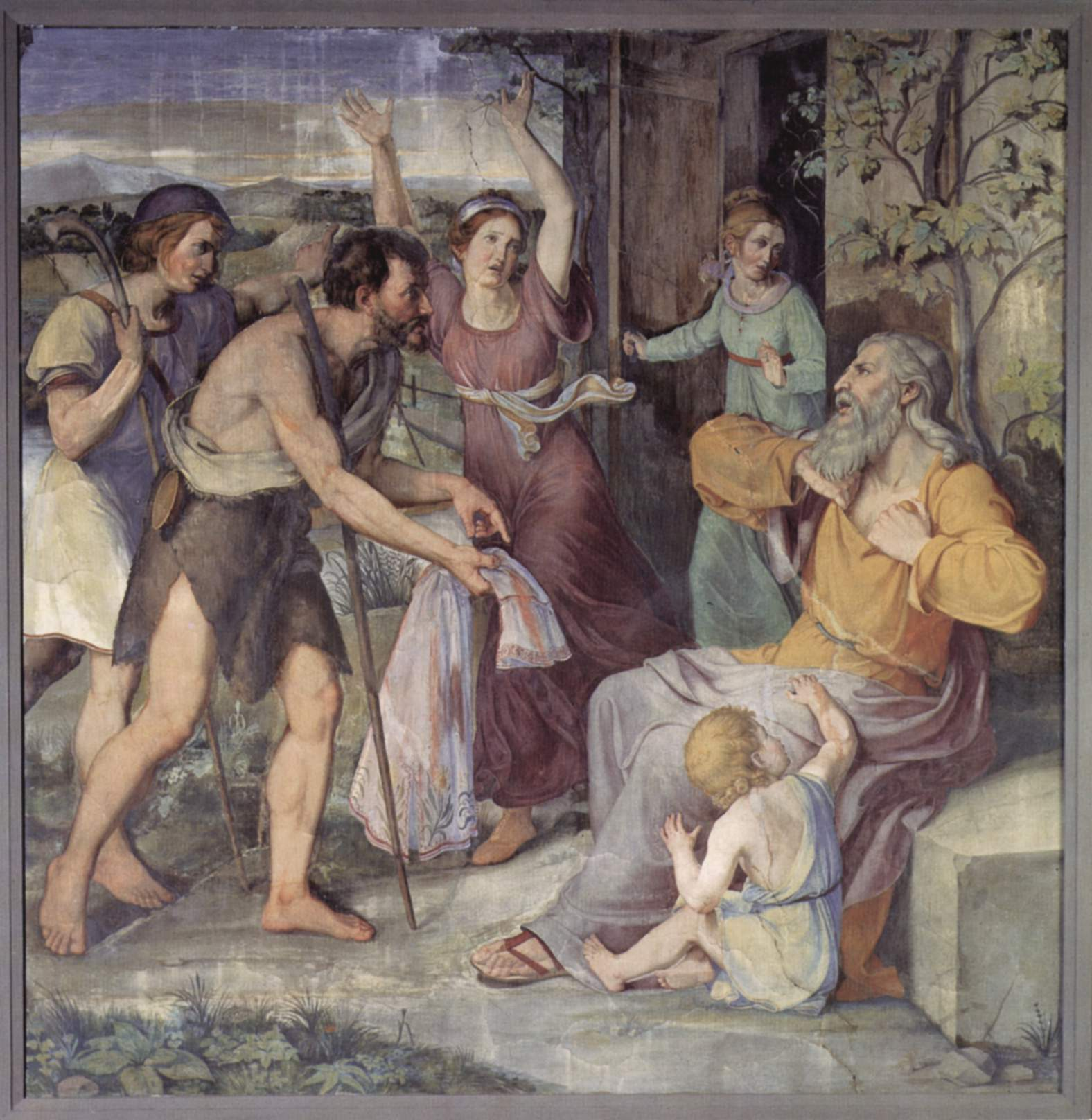
Jacob Sees Joseph's Coat (painting circa 1816–1817 by Friedrich Wilhelm Schadow)

=== Second reading—Genesis 37:12–22 ===
In the second reading, when the brothers went to feed the flock in Shechem, Jacob sent Joseph to see whether all was well with them. A man found Joseph and asked him what he sought, and when he told the man that he sought his brothers, the man told him that they had departed for Dothan. When Joseph's brothers saw him coming, they conspired to kill him, cast him into a pit, say that a beast had devoured him, and see what would become of his dreams then. But Reuben persuaded them not to kill him but to cast him into a pit, hoping to restore him to Jacob later. The second reading ends here.

=== Third reading—Genesis 37:23–36 ===
In the third reading, Joseph's brothers stripped him of his coat of many colors and cast him into an empty pit. They sat down to eat, and when they saw a caravan of Ishmaelites from Gilead bringing spices and balm to Egypt, Judah persuaded the brothers to sell Joseph to the Ishmaelites. Passing Midianite merchants drew Joseph out of the pit, and sold Joseph to the Ishmaelites for 20 shekels of silver, and they brought him to Egypt. When Reuben returned to the pit and Joseph was gone, he rent his clothes and asked his brothers where he could go now. They took Joseph's coat of many colors, dipped it in goat's blood, and sent it to Jacob to identify. Jacob concluded that a beast had devoured Joseph, and rent his garments, put on sackcloth, and mourned for his son. All his sons and daughters tried in vain to comfort him. And the Midianites sold Joseph in Egypt to Potiphar, Pharaoh's captain of the guard. The third reading and the first open portion end here with the end of chapter 37.

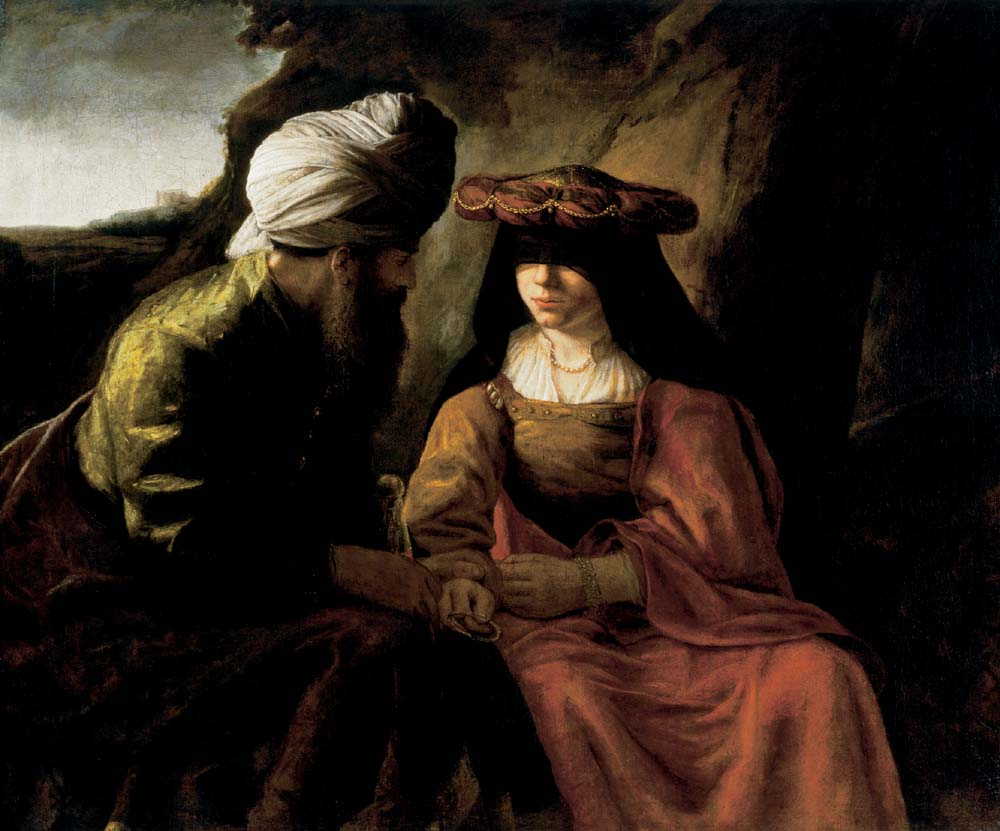
Judah and Tamar (painting circa 1650–1660 by the school of Rembrandt)

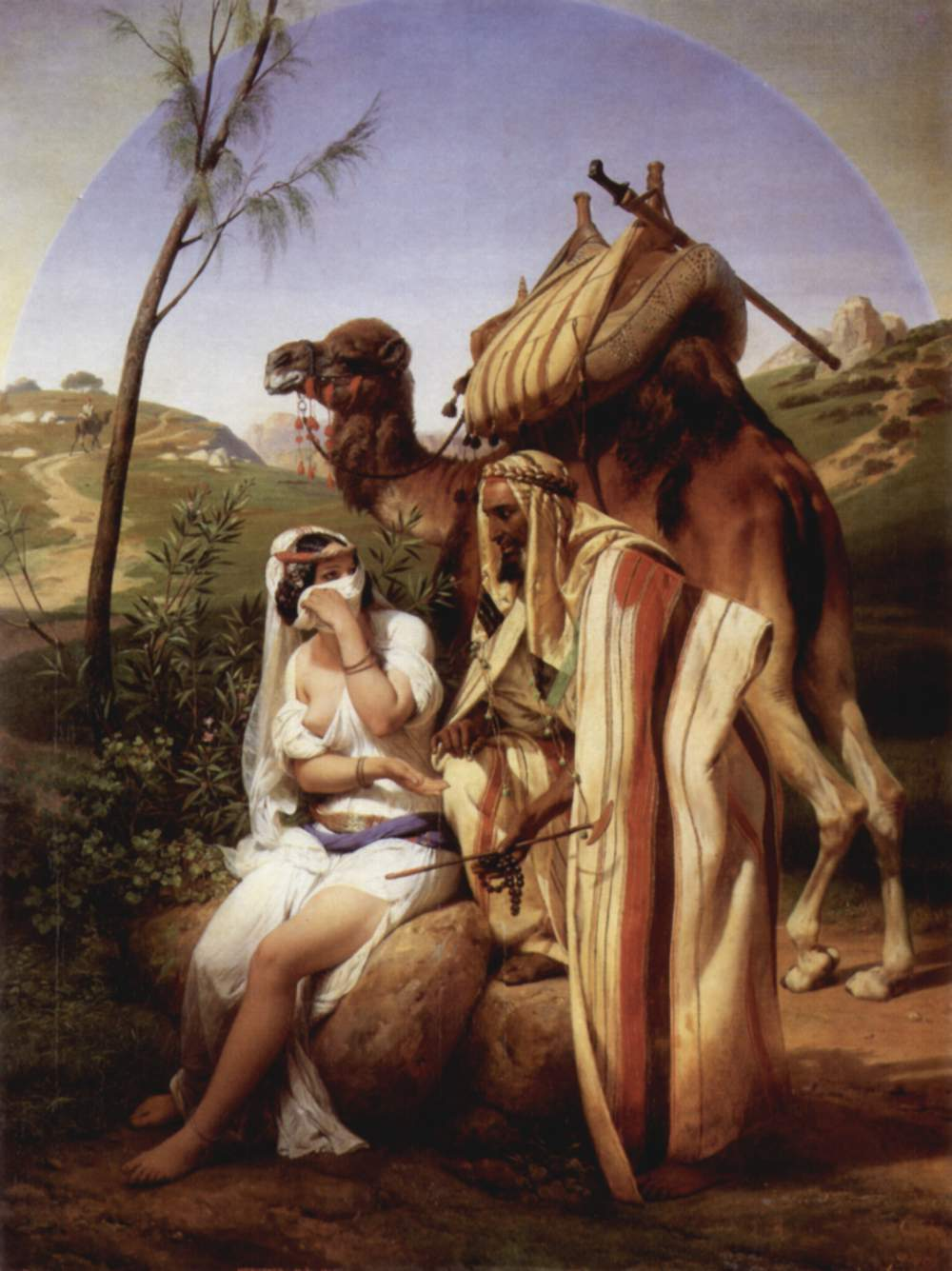
Judah and Tamar (1840 painting by Horace Vernet)

=== Fourth reading—Genesis chapter 38 ===
In the fourth reading, chapter 38, Judah left his brothers to live near an Adullamite named Hirah. Judah married the daughter of a Canaanite named Shua and had three sons named Er, Onan, and Shelah, the last of whom was born in Chezib. Judah arranged for Er to marry a woman named Tamar, but Er was wicked and God killed him. Judah directed Onan to perform a brother's duty and have children with Tamar in Er's name. But Onan knew that the children would not be counted as his, so he spilled his seed, and God killed him as well. Then Judah told Tamar to remain a widow in his house until Shelah could grow up, thinking that if Tamar wed Shelah, he might also die. Later, when Judah's wife died, he went with his friend Hirah to his sheep-shearers at Timnah. When Tamar learned that Judah had gone to Timnah, she took off her widow's garments and put on a veil and sat on the road to Timnah, for she saw that Shelah had grown up and Judah had not given her to be his wife. Judah took her for a harlot, offered her a young goat for her services, and gave her his signet and staff as a pledge for payment, and they cohabited and she conceived. Judah sent Hirah to deliver the young goat and collect his pledge, but he asked about and did not find her. When Hirah reported to Judah that the men of the place said that there had been no harlot there, Judah put the matter to rest so as not to be put to shame. About three months later, Judah heard that Tamar had played the harlot and become pregnant, and he ordered her to be brought forth and burned. When they seized her, she sent Judah the pledge to identify, saying that she was pregnant by the man whose things they were. Judah acknowledged them and said that she was more righteous than he, inasmuch as he had failed to give her to Shelah. When Tamar delivered, one twin—whom she would name Zerah—put out a hand and the midwife bound it with a scarlet thread, but then he drew it back and his brother—whom she would name Perez—came out. The fourth reading and a closed portion end here with the end of chapter 38.

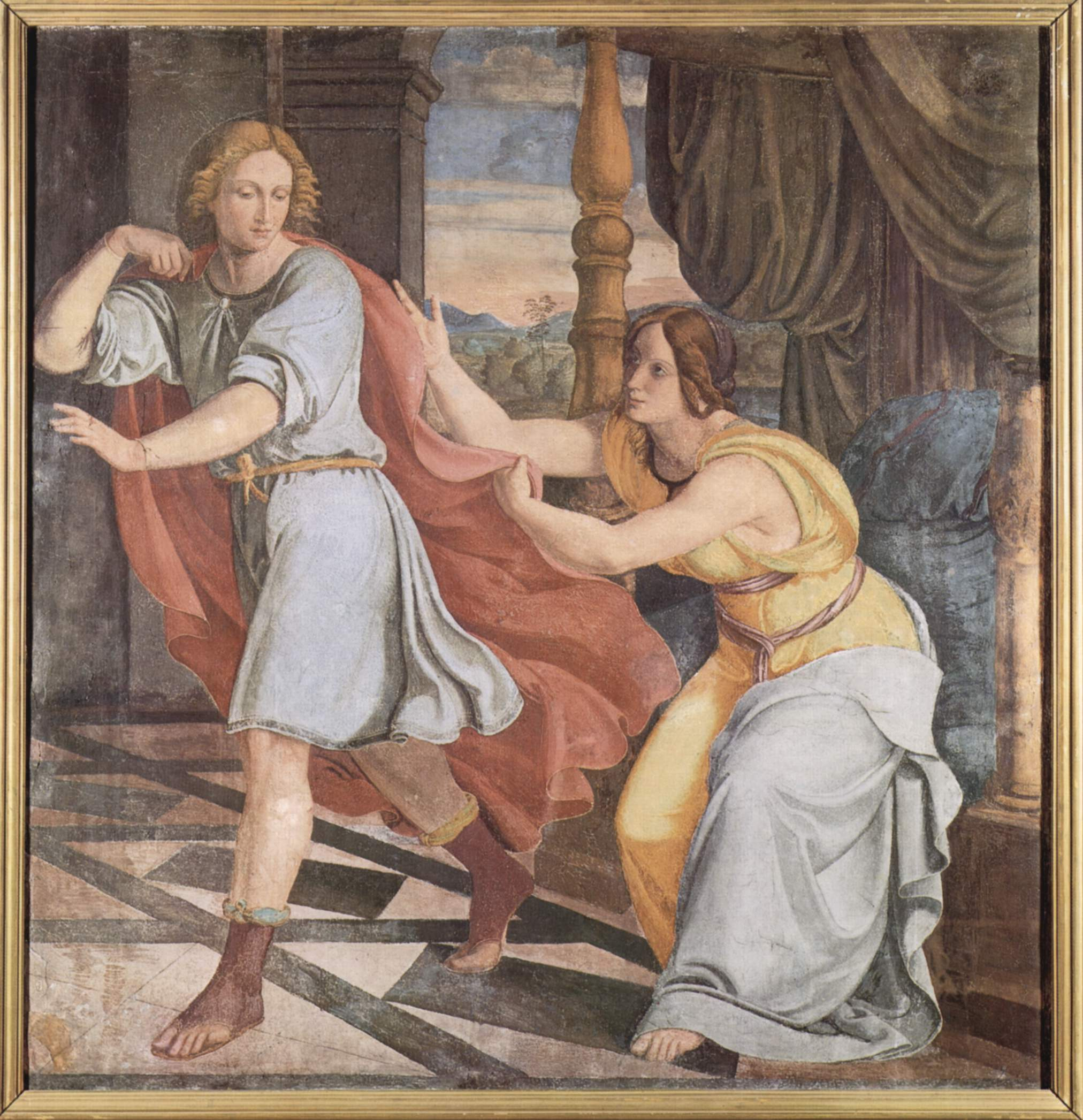
Joseph and the Wife of Potiphar (painting circa 1816–1817 by Philipp Veit)

=== Fifth reading—Genesis 39:1–6 ===
In the fifth reading, in chapter 39, Pharaoh's captain of the guard Potiphar bought Joseph from the Ishmaelites. When Potiphar saw that God was with Joseph and prospered all that he did, Potiphar appointed him overseer over his house and gave him charge of all that he had, and God blessed Pharaoh's house for Joseph's sake. Now Joseph was handsome. The fifth reading ends here.

=== Sixth reading—Genesis 39:7–23 ===
In the sixth reading, Potiphar's wife repeatedly asked Joseph to lie with her, but he declined, asking how he could sin so against Potiphar and God. One day, when the men of the house were away, she caught him by his garment and asked him to lie with her, but he fled, leaving his garment behind. When Potiphar came home, she accused Joseph of trying to force himself on her, and Potiphar put Joseph in the prison where the king's prisoners were held. But God was with Joseph, and gave him favor in the sight of the warden, who committed all the prisoners to Joseph's charge. The sixth reading and the second open portion end here with the end of chapter 39.

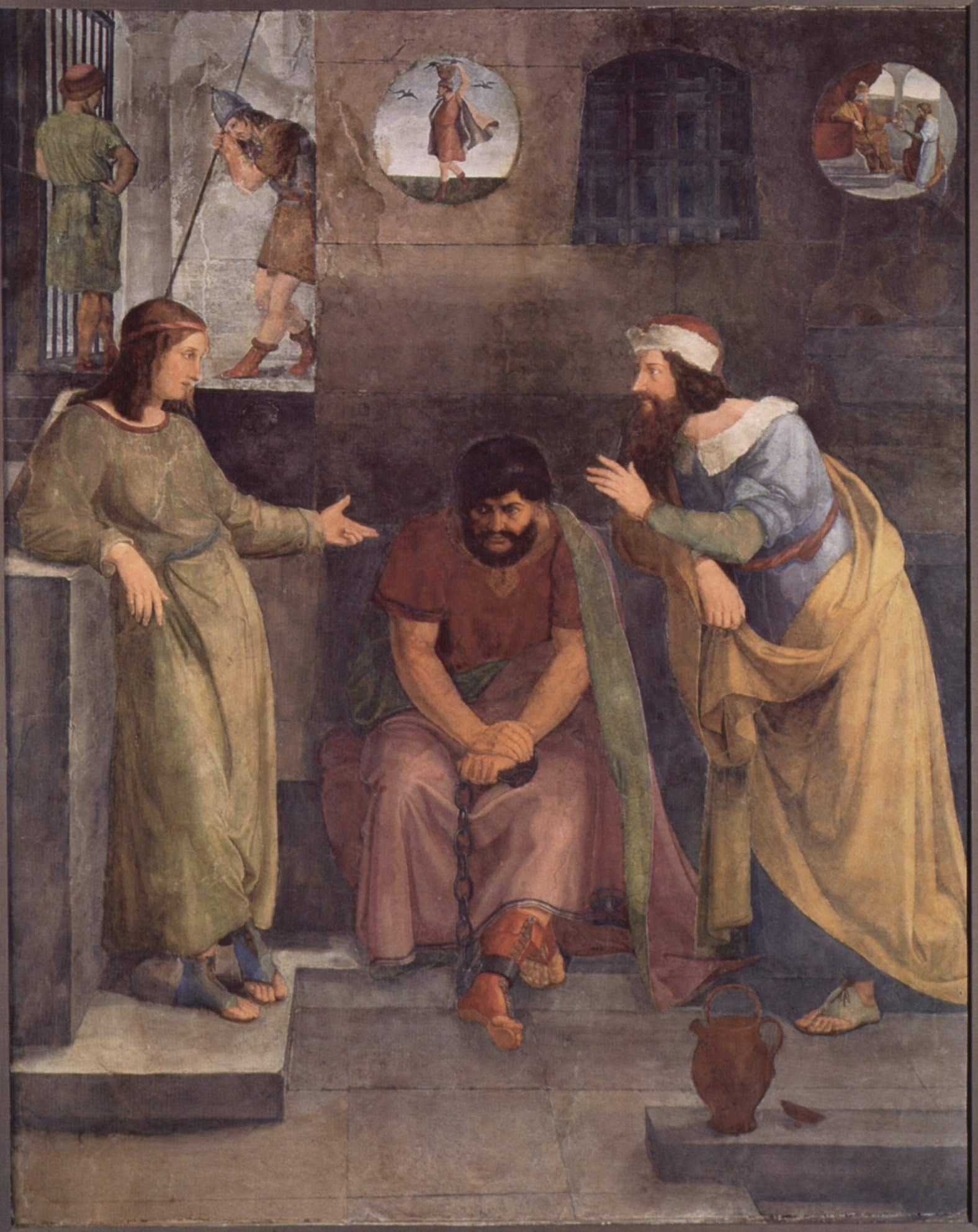
Joseph Interprets Dreams in Prison (painting circa 1816–1817 by Friedrich Wilhelm Schadow)

=== Seventh reading—Genesis chapter 40 ===
In the seventh reading, chapter 40, when the Pharaoh's butler and baker offended him, the Pharaoh put them into the prison as well. One night, the butler and the baker each dreamed a dream. Finding them sad, Joseph asked the cause, and they told him that it was because no one could interpret their dreams. Acknowledging that interpretations belong to God, Joseph asked them to tell him their dreams. The butler told Joseph that he dreamt that he saw a vine with three branches blossom and bring forth grapes, which he took and pressed into Pharaoh's cup, which he gave to Pharaoh. Joseph interpreted that within three days, Pharaoh would lift up the butler's head and restore him to his office, where he would give Pharaoh his cup just as he used to do. And Joseph asked the butler to remember him and mention him to Pharaoh, so that he might be brought out of the prison, for he had been stolen away from his land and had done nothing to warrant his imprisonment. When the baker saw that the interpretation of the butler's dream was good, he told Joseph his dream: he saw three baskets of white bread on his head, and the birds ate them out of the basket. Joseph interpreted that within three days Pharaoh would lift up the baker's head and hang him on a tree, and the birds would eat his flesh. In the maftir (מפטיר) reading that concludes the parashah, on the third day, which was Pharaoh's birthday, Pharaoh made a feast, restored the chief butler to his butlership, and hanged the baker, just as Joseph had predicted. But the butler forgot about Joseph. The seventh reading, the third open portion, chapter 40, and the parashah end here.

=== Readings according to the triennial cycle ===
Jews who read the Torah according to the triennial cycle of Torah reading read the parashah according to the following schedule:

	Year 1	Year 2	Year 3
	2022, 2025, 2028 . . .	2023, 2026, 2029 . . .	2024, 2027, 2030 . . .
Reading	37:1–36	38:1–30	39:1–40:23
1	37:1–3	38:1–5	39:1–6
2	37:4–7	38:6–11	39:7–10
3	37:8–11	38:12–14	39:11–18
4	37:12–17	38:15–19	39:19–23
5	37:18–22	38:20–23	40:1–8
6	37:23–28	38:24–26	40:9–15
7	37:29–36	38:27–30	40:16–23
Maftir	37:34–36	38:27–30	40:20–23

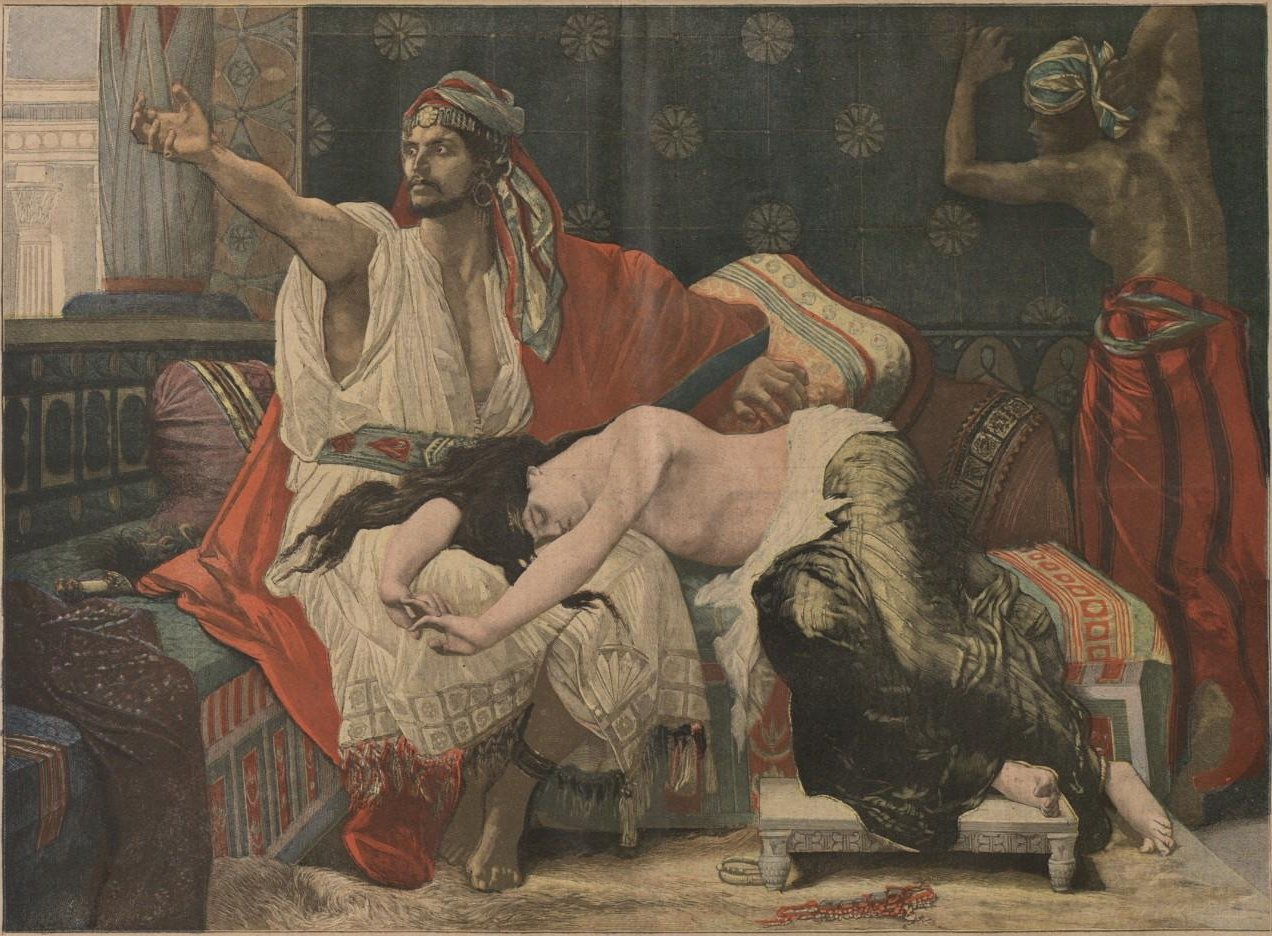
Amnon and Tamar (1892 painting by Alexandre Cabanel)

== In inner-biblical interpretation ==
The parashah has parallels or is discussed in these Biblical sources:

=== Genesis chapter 37 ===
Genesis 37:3 reports that Jacob made Joseph "a coat of many colors" (כְּתֹנֶת פַּסִּים, ketonet pasim). Similarly, 2 Samuel 13:18 reports that David's daughter Tamar had "a garment of many colors" (כְּתֹנֶת פַּסִּים, ketonet pasim). 2 Samuel 13:18 explains that "with such robes were the king's daughters that were virgins appareled." As Genesis 37:23–24 reports Joseph's half-brothers assaulted him, 2 Samuel 13:14 recounts that Tamar's half-brother Amnon assaulted her. And as Genesis 37:31–33 reports that Joseph's coat was marred to make it appear that Joseph was torn in pieces, 2 Samuel 13:19 reports that Tamar's coat was torn.

Retelling events of Genesis 37:27–36, Psalm 105:17–18 says, "[God] sent ahead of them an agent—Joseph, sold into slavery. His feet were subjected to fetters; an iron collar was put on his neck." And Genesis 45:5 reports that Joseph later told his brothers, "Now, do not be distressed or reproach yourselves because you sold me hither; it was to save life that God sent me ahead of you."

=== Genesis chapter 38 ===
The story of Tamar in Genesis 38:6–11 reflects the duty of a brother pursuant to Deuteronomy 25:5–10 to perform a Levirate marriage (יִבּוּם, yibbum) with the wife of a deceased brother, which is also reflected in the story of Ruth in Ruth 1:5–11; 3:12; and 4:1–12.

== In classical rabbinic interpretation ==
The parashah is discussed in these rabbinic sources from the era of the Mishnah and the Talmud:

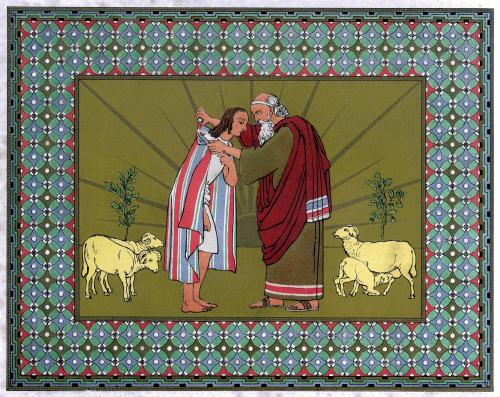
Israel loved Joseph more than all his children. (illustration by Owen Jones from the 1869 "The History of Joseph and His Brethren")

=== Genesis chapter 37 ===
Johanan bar Nappaha taught that wherever Scripture uses the term "And he abode" (וַיֵּשֶׁב, vayeshev), as it does in Genesis 37:1, it presages trouble. Thus in Numbers 25:1, "And Israel abode in Shittim" is followed by "and the people began to commit whoredom with the daughters of Moab". In Genesis 37:1, "And Jacob dwelt in the land where his father was a stranger, in the land of Canaan," is followed by Genesis 37:3, "and Joseph brought to his father their evil report". In Genesis 47:27, "And Israel dwelt in the land of Egypt, in the country of Goshen," is followed by Genesis 47:29, "And the time drew near that Israel must die." In 1 Kings 5:5, "And Judah and Israel dwelt safely, every man under his vine and under his fig tree," is followed by 1 Kings 11:14, "And the Lord stirred up an adversary unto Solomon, Hadad the Edomite; he was the king's seed in Edom."

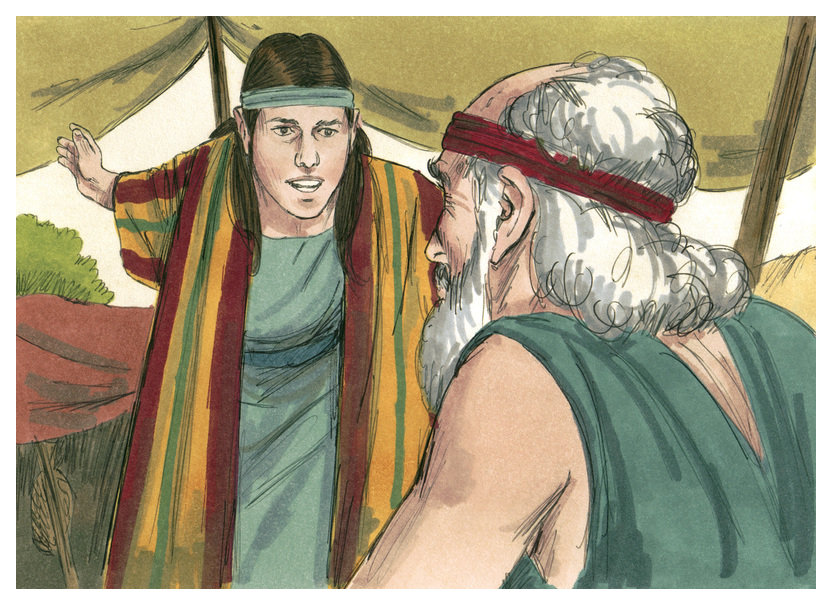
Joseph brought bad reports to his father. (1984 illustration by Jim Padgett, courtesy of Distant Shores Media/Sweet Publishing)

Rabbi Helbo quoted Rabbi Jonathan to teach that the words of Genesis 37:2, "These are the generations of Jacob, Joseph," indicate that the firstborn should have come from Rachel, but Leah prayed for mercy before Rachel did. Because of Rachel's modesty, however, God restored the rights of the firstborn to Rachel's son Joseph from Leah's son Reuben. To teach what caused Leah to anticipate Rachel with her prayer for mercy, Rav taught that Leah's eyes were sore (as Genesis 29:17 reports) from her crying about what she heard at the crossroads. There she heard people saying: "Rebecca has two sons, and Laban has two daughters; the elder daughter should marry the elder son, and the younger daughter should marry the younger son." Leah inquired about the elder son, and the people said that he was a wicked man, a highway robber. And Leah asked about the younger son, and the people said that he was (in the words of Genesis 25:27) "a quiet man dwelling in tents." So she cried about her fate until her eyelashes fell out. This accounts for the words of Genesis 29:31, "And the Lord saw that Leah was hated, and He opened her womb," which mean not that Leah was actually hated, but rather that God saw that Esau's conduct was hateful to Leah, so he rewarded her prayer for mercy by opening her womb first.

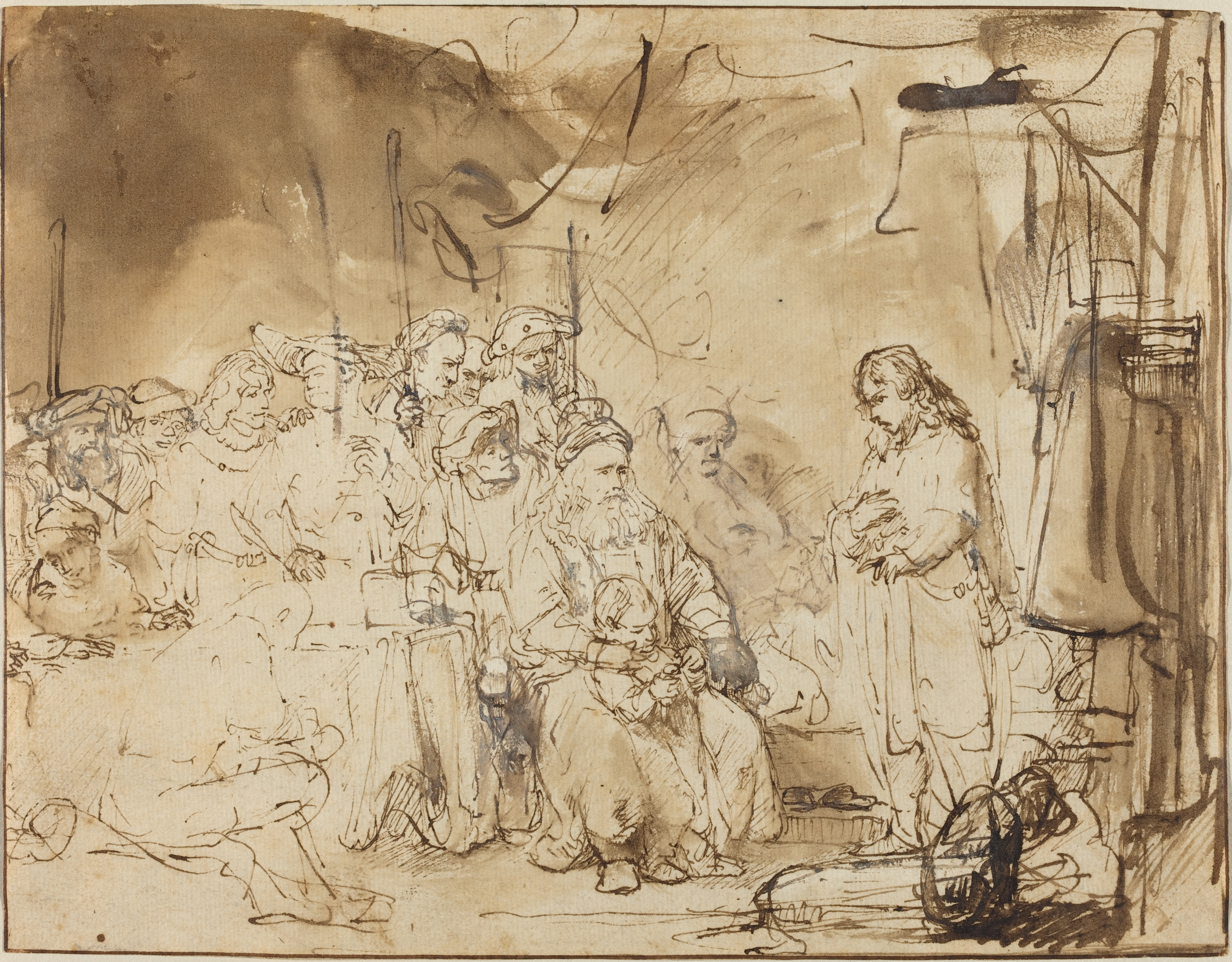
Joseph Recounting His Dreams (drawing by Rembrandt)

After introducing "the line of Jacob," Genesis 37:2 cites only Joseph. The Gemara explained that the verse indicates that Joseph was worthy of having 12 tribes descend from him, as they did from his father Jacob. But Joseph diminished some of his procreative powers to resist Potiphar's wife in Genesis 39:7–12. Nevertheless, ten sons (who, added to Joseph's two, made the total of 12) issued from Joseph's brother Benjamin and were given names on Joseph's account (as Genesis 46:21 reports). A son was called Bela, because Joseph was swallowed up (nivla) among the peoples. A son was called Becher, because Joseph was the firstborn (bechor) of his mother. A son was called Ashbel, because God sent Joseph into captivity (shevao el). A son was called Gera, because Joseph dwelt (gar) in a strange land. A son was called Naaman, because Joseph was especially beloved (na'im). Sons were called Ehi and Rosh, because Joseph was to Benjamin "my brother" (achi) and chief (rosh). Sons were called Muppim and Huppim, because Benjamin said that Joseph did not see Benjamin's marriage-canopy (chuppah). A son was called Ard because Joseph descended (yarad) among the peoples. Others explain that he was called Ard, because Joseph's face was like a rose (vered).

Reading the report of Genesis 37:2 that "Joseph brought evil report of them to their father," a midrash asked what Joseph said. Rabbi Meir taught that Joseph told Jacob that his sons were suspected of eating the limb of a living animal. Rabbi Simeon taught that Joseph told Jacob that they were staring at the girls of the land. Rabbi Judah taught that Joseph told Jacob that they were demeaning the sons of the maidservants and calling them slaves. Rabbi Judah bar Simeon taught that God punished Joseph for all three of these reports. Because Joseph told Jacob that his sons were suspected of eating the limb of a living animal, Joseph's brothers slaughtered the goat to deceive Jacob in Genesis 37:31. Because Joseph told Jacob that his sons were demeaning the sons of the maidservants and calling them slaves, "Joseph was sold as a slave" (Psalms 105:17). Because Joseph told Jacob that they were staring at the girls of the land, Potiphar's wife "cast her eyes upon Joseph." (Genesis 39:7).

Rabbi Levi used Genesis 37:2, 41:46, and 45:6 to calculate that Joseph's dreams that his brothers would bow to him took 22 years to come true, and deduced that a person should thus wait for as much as 22 years for a positive dream's fulfillment.

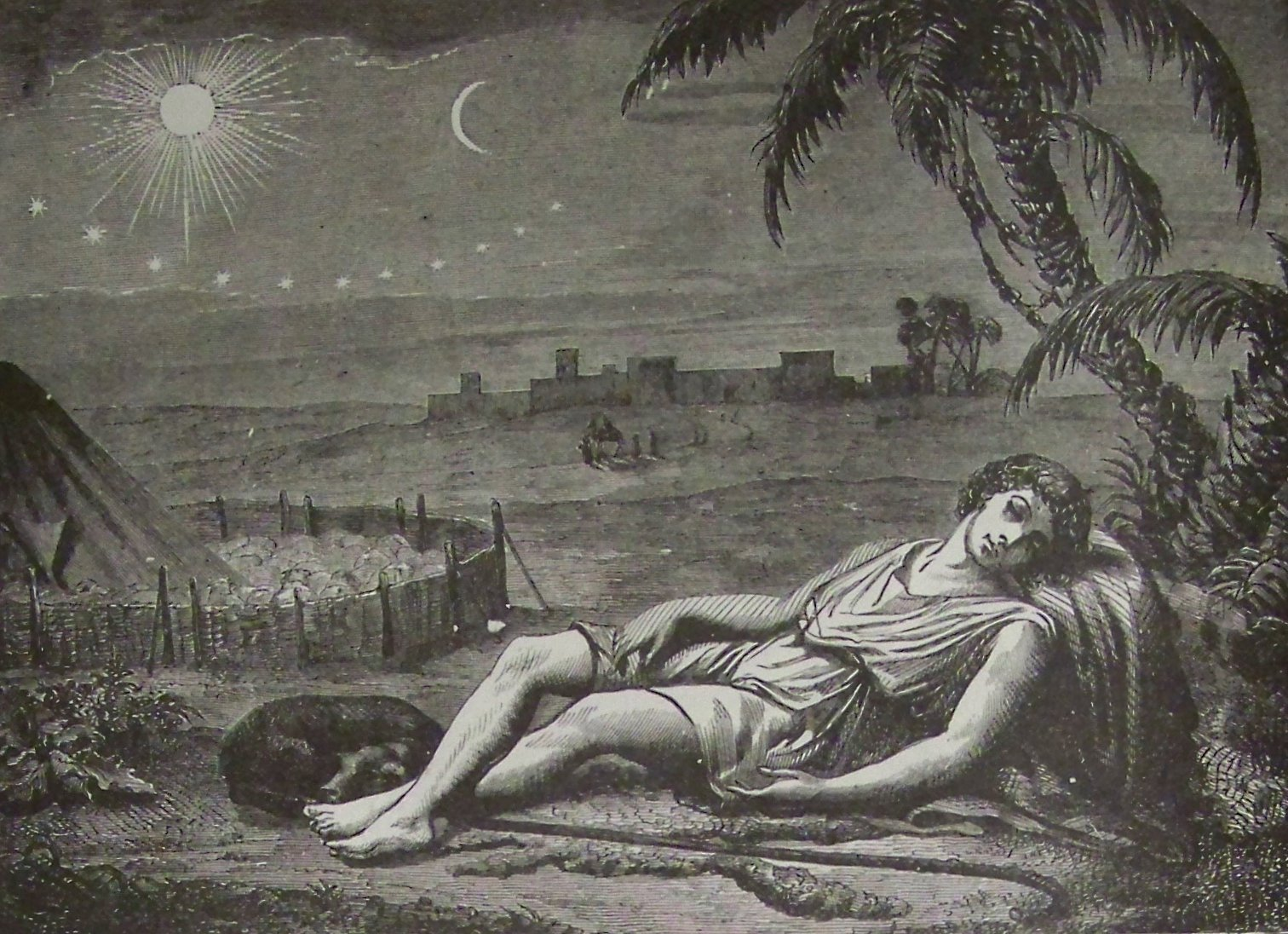
Joseph's Dream (illustration from the 1890 Holman Bible)

Rava bar Mehasia said in the name of Rav Hama bar Goria in Rav's name that a man should never single out one son among his other sons, for on account of the small weight of silk that Jacob gave Joseph more than he gave his other sons (as reported in Genesis 37:3), his brothers became jealous of Joseph and the matter resulted in the Israelites' descent into Egypt.

Genesis 37:5–7 recounts Joseph's dreams. When Samuel had a good dream, he used to question whether dreams speak falsely, seeing as in Numbers 10:2, God says, "I speak with him in a dream?" When he had a bad dream, he used to quote Zechariah 10:2, "The dreams speak falsely." Rava pointed out the potential contradiction between Numbers 10:2 and Zechariah 10:2. The Gemara resolved the contradiction, teaching that Numbers 10:2, "I speak with him in a dream?" refers to dreams that come through an angel, whereas Zechariah 10:2, "The dreams speak falsely," refers to dreams that come through a demon. The Gemara taught that a dream is a sixtieth part of prophecy. Rabbi Hanan taught that even if the Master of Dreams (an angel, in a dream that truly foretells the future) tells a person that on the next day the person will die, the person should not desist from prayer, for as Ecclesiastes 5:6 says, "For in the multitude of dreams are vanities and also many words, but fear God." (Although a dream may seem reliably to predict the future, it will not necessarily come true; one must place one's trust in God.) Rabbi Samuel bar Nahmani said in the name of Rabbi Jonathan that a person is shown in a dream only what is suggested by the person's own thoughts (while awake), as Daniel 2:29 says, "As for you, Oh King, your thoughts came into your mind upon your bed," and Daniel 2:30 says, "That you may know the thoughts of the heart."

Noting that in Genesis 37:10, Jacob asked Joseph, "Shall I and your mother . . . indeed come," when Joseph's mother Rachel was then dead, Rabbi Levi said in the name of Rabbi Hama ben Haninah that Jacob believed that resurrection would take place in his days. But Rabbi Levi taught that Jacob did not know that Joseph's dream in fact applied to Bilhah, Rachel's handmaid, who had brought Joseph up like a mother.

Noting that dots appear over the word et (אֶת, the direct object indicator) in Genesis 37:12, which says, "And his brethren went to feed their father's flock," a Midrash reinterpreted the verse to intimate that Joseph's brothers actually went to feed themselves.

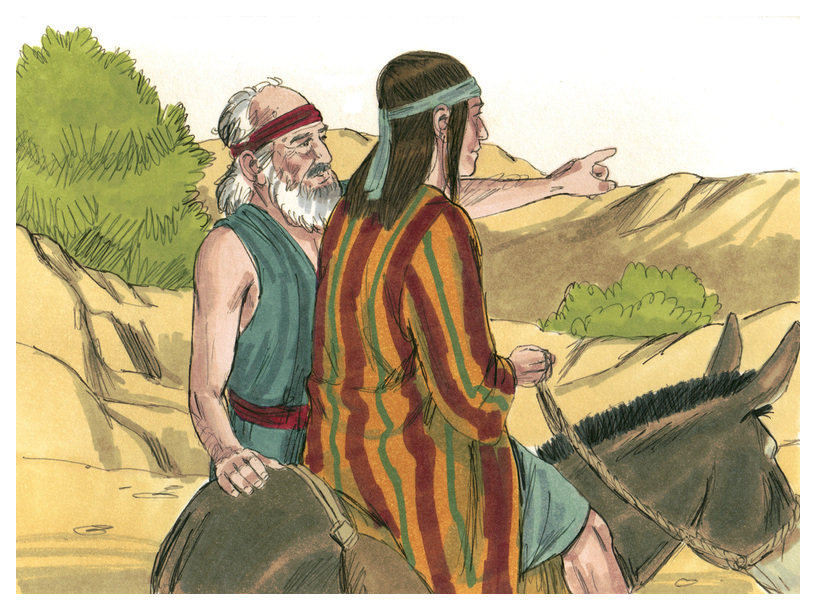
Jacob called Joseph and told him to go to Shechem. (1984 illustration by Jim Padgett, courtesy of Distant Shores Media/Sweet Publishing)

The Pirke De-Rabbi Eliezer taught that Joseph saw the sons of Jacob's concubines eating the flesh of roes and sheep while they were still alive and reported on them to Jacob. And so they could not stand to see Joseph's face anymore in peace, as Genesis 37:4 reports. Jacob told Joseph that he had waited many days without hearing of the welfare of Joseph's brethren, and of the welfare of the flock, and thus, as reported in Genesis 37:14, Jacob asked Joseph, "Go now, see whether it be well with your brethren, and well with the flock."

Reading Genesis 37:13, "And he said to him: 'Here am I,'" Rabbi Hama bar Rabbi Hanina said that after Joseph went missing, Jacob was ever mindful of Joseph words and Jacob's insides were torn up about them. For Jacob realized that Joseph had known that his brothers hated him, and yet he answered Jacob: ‘Here am I.'"

Rabbi Ḥanina bar Pappa read the words of Genesis 37:14, "And he sent him from the valley (עֵמֶק, emek) of Hebron," to hint that Jacob sent Joseph from the deep (עֲמוּקָּה, amukka) counsel of the person interred in Hebron—Abraham—as in Genesis 15:13, God had told Abraham, "Know that your seed shall be a stranger in a land that is not theirs, and shall serve them; and they shall afflict them 400 years." Jacob's sending Joseph to his brothers thus set in motion the descent of the Children of Israel to Egypt in fulfillment of God's words to Abraham.

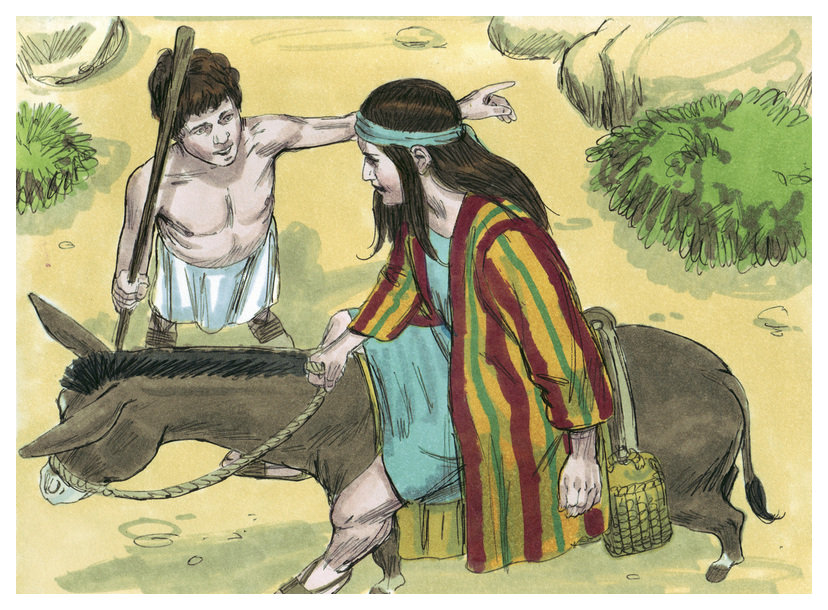
Joseph found a young man who told him that his brothers had left. (1984 illustration by Jim Padgett, courtesy of Distant Shores Media/Sweet Publishing)

Reading in Genesis 37:15–17 the three parallel clauses, "And a certain man found him," "And the man asked him," "And the man said," Rabbi Yannai deduced that three angels met Joseph.

The Pirke De-Rabbi Eliezer read the word "man" in Genesis 37:15–17 to mean the archangel Gabriel, as Daniel 9:21 says, "The man Gabriel, whom I had seen in the vision." The Pirke De-Rabbi Eliezer taught that Gabriel asked Joseph what he sought. Joseph told Gabriel that he sought his brethren, as Genesis 37:16 reports. And Gabriel led Joseph to his brethren.

Noting that Genesis 37:21 reports, "And Reuben heard it," a Midrash asked where Reuben had been. Rabbi Judah taught that each one of the brothers attended to Jacob one day, and that day it was Reuben's turn. Rabbi Nehemiah taught that Reuben reasoned that he was the firstborn, and he alone would be held responsible for the crime. The Rabbis taught that Reuben reasoned that Joseph had included Reuben with his brethren in Joseph's dream of the sun and the moon and the eleven stars in Genesis 37:9, when Reuben thought that he had been expelled from the company of his brothers on account of the incident of Genesis 35:22. Because Joseph counted Reuben as a brother, Reuben felt motivated to rescue Joseph. And since Reuben was the first to engage in life saving, God decreed that the Cities of Refuge would be set up first within the borders of the Tribe of Reuben in Deuteronomy 4:43.

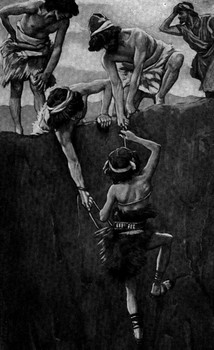
Joseph's Brothers Raise Him from the Pit in Order To Sell Him (watercolor circa 1896–1902 by James Tissot)

Reading Genesis 37:21, Rabbi Eleazar contrasted Reuben's magnanimity with Esau's jealousy. As Genesis 25:33 reports, Esau voluntarily sold his birthright, but as Genesis 27:41 says, "Esau hated Jacob," and as Genesis 27:36 says, "And he said, 'Is not he rightly named Jacob? for he has supplanted me these two times.'" In Reuben's case, Joseph took Reuben's birthright from him against his will, as 1 Chronicles 5:1 reports, "for as much as he defiled his father's couch, his birthright was given to the sons of Joseph." Nonetheless, Reuben was not jealous of Joseph, as Genesis 37:21 reports, "And Reuben heard it, and delivered him out of their hand."

Interpreting the detail of the phrase in Genesis 37:23, "they stripped Joseph of his coat, the coat of many colors that was on him", a Midrash taught that Joseph's brothers stripped him of his cloak, his shirt, his tunic, and his breeches.

A Midrash asked who "took him, and cast him into the pit" in Genesis 37:24, and replied that it was his brother Simeon. And the Midrash taught that Simeon was repaid when in Genesis 42:24, Joseph took Simeon from among the brothers and had him bound before their eyes.

Interpreting the words "the pit was empty, there was no water in it" in Genesis 37:24, a Midrash taught that there was indeed no water in it, but snakes and serpents were in it. And because the word "pit" appears twice in Genesis 37:24, the Midrash deduced that there were two pits, one full of pebbles, and the other full of snakes and scorpions. Rabbi Aha interpreted the words "the pit was empty" to teach that Jacob's pit was emptied—Jacob's children were emptied of their compassion. The Midrash interpreted the words "there was no water in it" to teach that there was no recognition of Torah in it, as Torah is likened to water, as Isaiah 55:1 says, "everyone that thirsts, come for water." For the Torah (in Deuteronomy 24:7) says, "If a man be found stealing any of his brethren of the children of Israel . . . and sell him, then that thief shall die," and yet Joseph's brothers sold their brother.

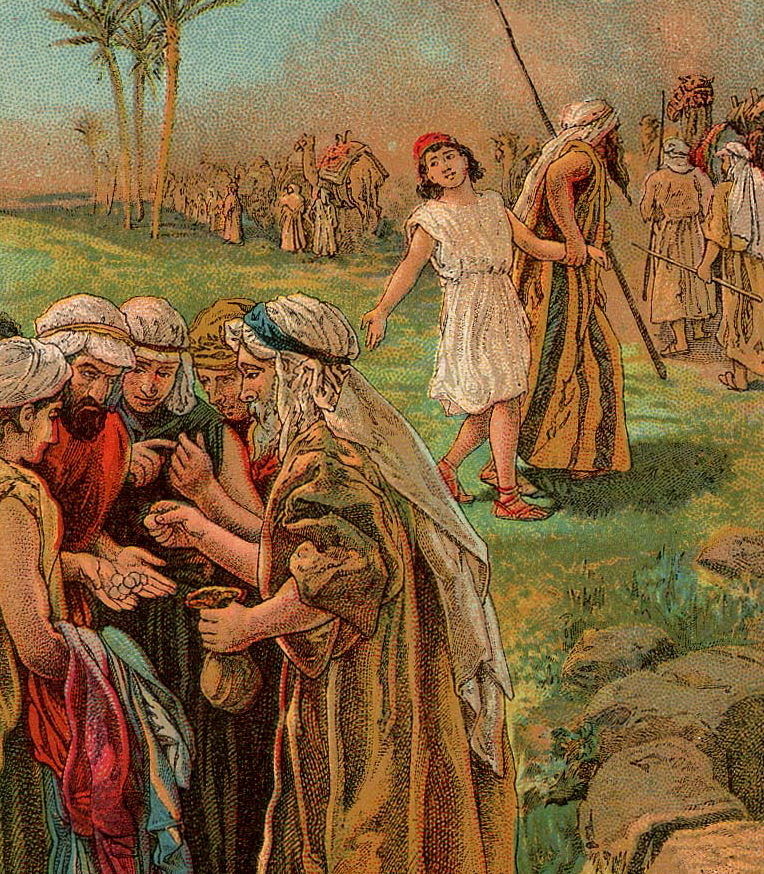
Joseph Sold by His Brothers (illustration from a Bible card published 1907 by the Providence Lithograph Company)

Rabbi Judah ben Ilai taught that Scripture speaks in praise of Judah. Rabbi Judah noted that on three occasions, Scripture records that Judah spoke before his brethren, and they made him king over them (bowing to his authority): (1) in Genesis 37:26, which reports, "Judah said to his brethren: ‘What profit is it if we slay our brother'"; (2) in Genesis 44:14, which reports, "Judah and his brethren came to Joseph's house"; and (3) in Genesis 44:18, which reports, "Then Judah came near" to Joseph to argue for Benjamin.

A Midrash taught that because Judah acted worthily and saved Joseph from death (in Genesis 37:26–27) and saved Tamar and her two children from death (in Genesis 38:26, for as Genesis 38:24 reports, Tamar was then three months pregnant), God delivered four of Judah's descendants, Daniel from the lion's den as a reward for Joseph, and three from the fire—Hananiah, Mishael, and Azariah—as a reward for Perez, Zerah, and Tamar, as Genesis 38:24 reports that Tamar and thus also her two unborn children Perez and Zerah had been sentenced to be burned.

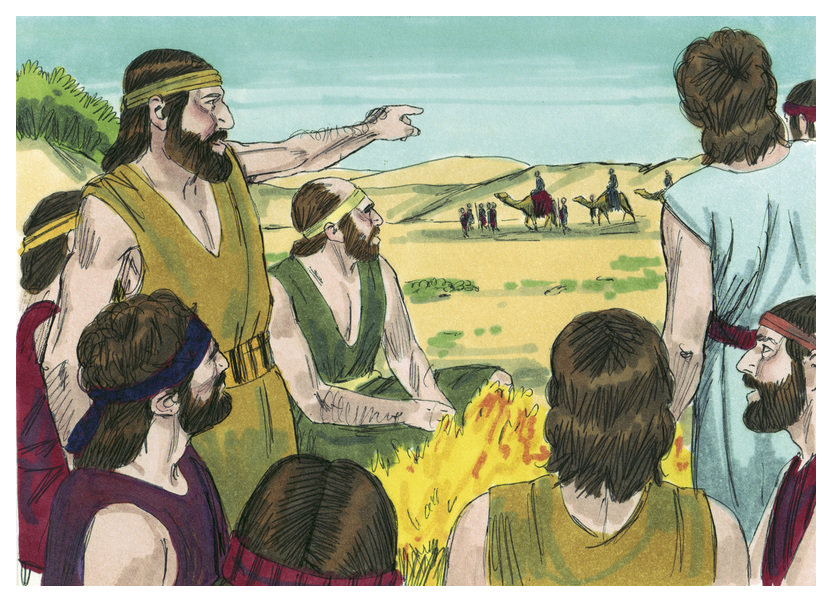
Judah said, "Let us sell him to the Ishmaelites." (Genesis 37:27) (1984 illustration by Jim Padgett, courtesy of Distant Shores Media/Sweet Publishing)

In contrast, another Midrash faulted Judah for not calling on the brothers to return Joseph to Jacob. Reading Deuteronomy 30:11–14, "For this commandment that I command you this day . . . is very near to you, in your mouth, and in your heart," a Midrash interpreted "heart" and "mouth" to symbolize the beginning and end of fulfilling a precept and thus read Deuteronomy 30:11–14 as an exhortation to complete a good deed once started. Thus Rabbi Hiyya bar Abba taught that if one begins a precept and does not complete it, the result will be that he will bury his wife and children. The Midrash cited as support for this proposition the experience of Judah, who began a precept and did not complete it. When Joseph came to his brothers and they sought to kill him, as Joseph's brothers said in Genesis 37:20, "Come now therefore, and let us slay him," Judah did not let them, saying in Genesis 37:26, "What profit is it if we slay our brother?" and they listened to him, for he was their leader. And had Judah called for Joseph's brothers to restore Joseph to their father, they would have listened to him then, as well. Thus, because Judah began a precept (the good deed toward Joseph) and did not complete it, he buried his wife and two sons, as Genesis 38:12 reports, "Shua's daughter, the wife of Judah, died," and Genesis 46:12 further reports, "Er and Onan died in the land of Canaan." In another Midrash reading "heart" and "mouth" in Deuteronomy 30:11–14 to symbolize the beginning and the end of fulfilling a precept, Rabbi Levi said in the name of Hama bar Hanina that if one begins a precept and does not complete it, and another comes and completes it, it is attributed to the one who has completed it. The Midrash illustrated this by citing how Moses began a precept by taking the bones of Joseph with him, as Exodus 13:19 reports, "And Moses took the bones of Joseph with him." But because Moses never brought Joseph's bones into the Land of Israel, the precept is attributed to the Israelites, who buried them, as Joshua 24:32 reports, "And the bones of Joseph, which the children of Israel brought up out of Egypt, they buried in Shechem." Joshua 24:32 does not say, "Which Moses brought up out of Egypt," but "Which the children of Israel brought up out of Egypt." And the Midrash explained that the reason that they buried Joseph's bones in Shechem could be compared to a case in which some thieves stole a cask of wine, and when the owner discovered them, the owner told them that after they had consumed the wine, they needed to return the cask to its proper place. So when the brothers sold Joseph, it was from Shechem that they sold him, as Genesis 37:13 reports, "And Israel said to Joseph: 'Do not your brothers feed the flock in Shechem?'" God told the brothers that since they had sold Joseph from Shechem, they needed to return Joseph's bones to Shechem. And as the Israelites completed the precept, it is called by their name, demonstrating the force of Deuteronomy 30:11–14, "For this commandment that I command you this day . . . is very near to you, in your mouth, and in your heart."

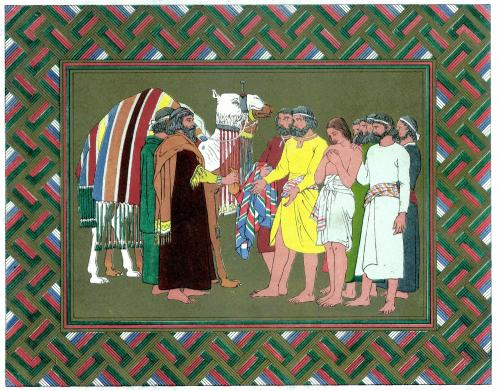
They sold Joseph to the Ishmaelites for twenty pieces of silver. (illustration by Owen Jones from the 1869 "The History of Joseph and His Brethren")

A Midrash read Judah's questions in Genesis 44:16, "What shall we speak or how shall we clear ourselves?" to hint to a series of sins. Judah asked, "What shall we say to my lord," with respect to the money that they retained after the first sale, the money that they retained after the second sale, the cup found in Benjamin's belongings, the treatment of Tamar in Genesis 38, the treatment of Bilhah in Genesis 35:22, the treatment of Dinah in Genesis 34, the sale of Joseph in Genesis 37:28, allowing Simeon to remain in custody, and the peril to Benjamin.

Rabbi Judah ben Simon taught that God required each of the Israelites to give a half-shekel (as reported in Exodus 38:26) because (as reported in Genesis 37:28) their ancestors had sold Joseph to the Ishmaelites for 20 shekels.

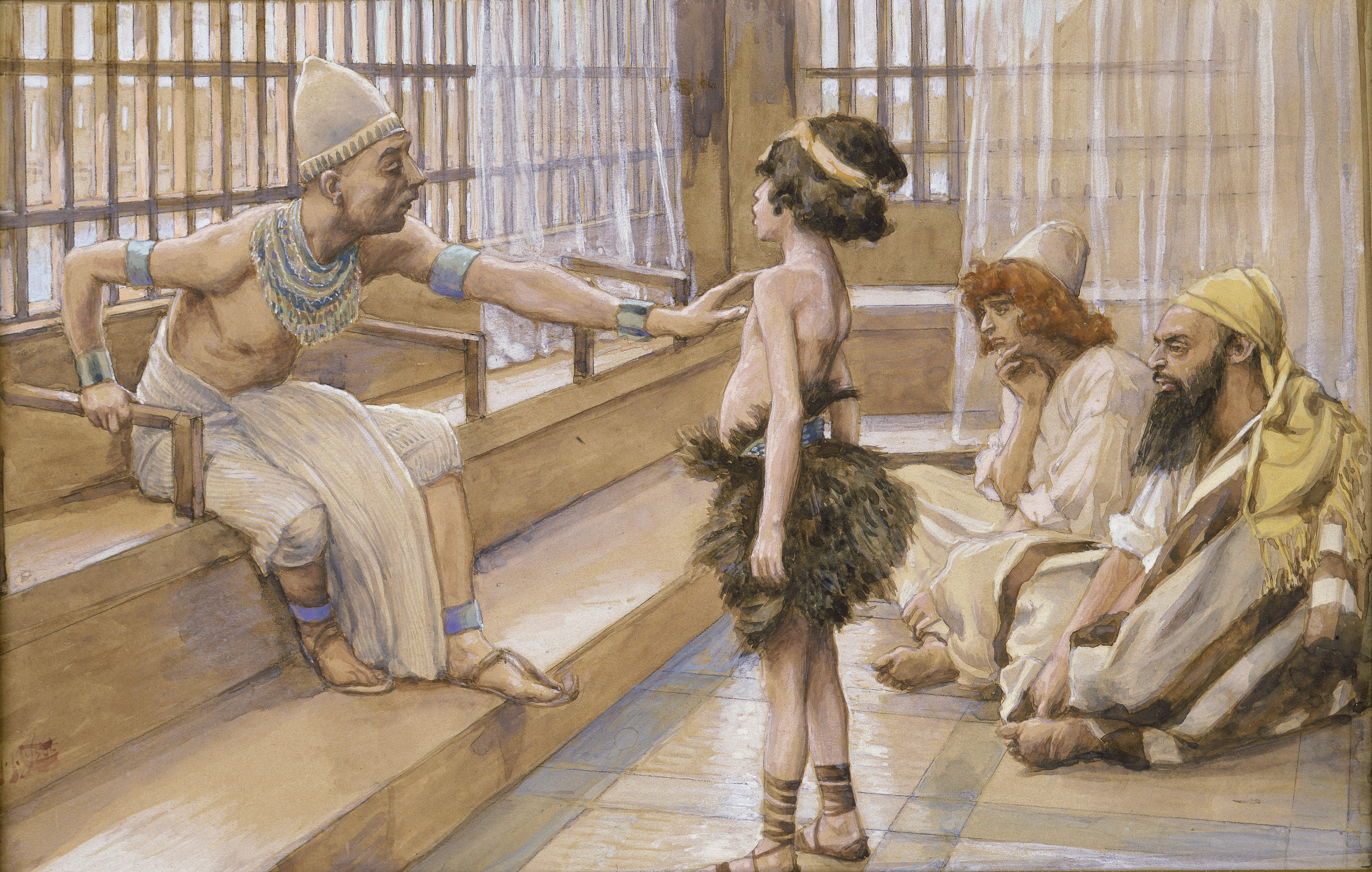
Joseph Sold into Egypt (watercolor circa 1896–1902 by James Tissot)

Rabbi Tarfon deduced characteristics of the Ishmaelites from the transaction reported in Genesis 37:28. Rabbi Tarfon taught that God came from Mount Sinai (or others say Mount Seir) and was revealed to the children of Esau, as Deuteronomy 33:2 says, “The Lord came from Sinai, and rose from Seir to them,” and “Seir” means the children of Esau, as Genesis 36:8 says, “And Esau dwelt in Mount Seir.” God asked them whether they would accept the Torah, and they asked what was written in it. God answered that it included (in Exodus 20:13 and Deuteronomy 5:17), “You shall do no murder.” The children of Esau replied that they were unable to abandon the blessing with which Isaac blessed Esau in Genesis 27:40, “By your sword shall you live.” From there, God turned and was revealed to the children of Ishmael, as Deuteronomy 33:2 says, “He shined forth from Mount Paran,” and “Paran” means the children of Ishmael, as Genesis 21:21 says of Ishmael, “And he dwelt in the wilderness of Paran.” God asked them whether they would accept the Torah, and they asked what was written in it. God answered that it included (in Exodus 20:13 and Deuteronomy 5:17), “You shall not steal.” The children of Ishmael replied that they were unable to abandon their fathers' custom, as Joseph said in Genesis 40:15 (referring to the Ishmaelites' transaction reported in Genesis 37:28), “For indeed I was stolen away out of the land of the Hebrews.” From there, God sent messengers to all the nations of the world asking them whether they would accept the Torah, and they asked what was written in it. God answered that it included (in Exodus 20:3 and Deuteronomy 5:7), "You shall have no other gods before me." They replied that they had no delight in the Torah, therefore let God give it to God's people, as Psalm 29:11 says, “The Lord will give strength [identified with the Torah] to His people; the Lord will bless His people with peace.” From there, God returned and was revealed to the children of Israel, as Deuteronomy 33:2 says, “And he came from the ten thousands of holy ones,” and the expression “ten thousands” means the children of Israel, as Numbers 10:36 says, “And when it rested, he said, ‘Return, O Lord, to the ten thousands of the thousands of Israel.’” With God were thousands of chariots and 20,000 angels, and God’s right hand held the Torah, as Deuteronomy 33:2 says, “At his right hand was a fiery law to them.”

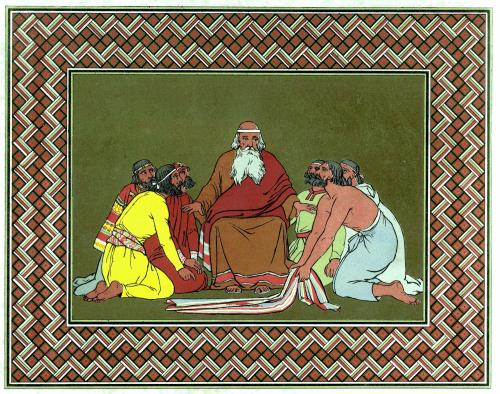
And he knew it, and said, it is my son's coat. (illustration by Owen Jones from the 1869 "The History of Joseph and His Brethren")

Reading Genesis 37:32, "and they sent the coat of many colors, and they brought it to their father; and said: ‘This have we found. Know now whether it is your son's coat or not,'" Johanan bar Nappaha taught that God ordained that since Judah said this to his father, he too would hear (from Tamar in Genesis 38:25) the challenge: Know now, whose are these? Similarly, reading the words of Genesis 38:25, "Discern, please," Rabbi Hama ben Hanina noted that with the same word, Judah made an announcement to his father, and Judah's daughter-in-law made an announcement to him. With the word "discern," Judah said to Jacob in Genesis 37:32, "Discern now whether it be your son's coat or not." And with the word "discern," Tamar said to Judah in Genesis 38:25, "Discern, please, whose are these."

Reading Genesis 37:36, a Midrash asked how many times Joseph was sold. Rabbi Judan and Rav Huna disagreed. Rabbi Judan maintained that Joseph was sold four times: His brothers sold him to the Ishmaelites, the Ishmaelites to the merchants, the merchants to the Midianites, and the Midianites into Egypt. Rav Huna said Joseph was sold five times, concluding with the Midianites selling him to the Egyptians, and the Egyptians to Potiphar.

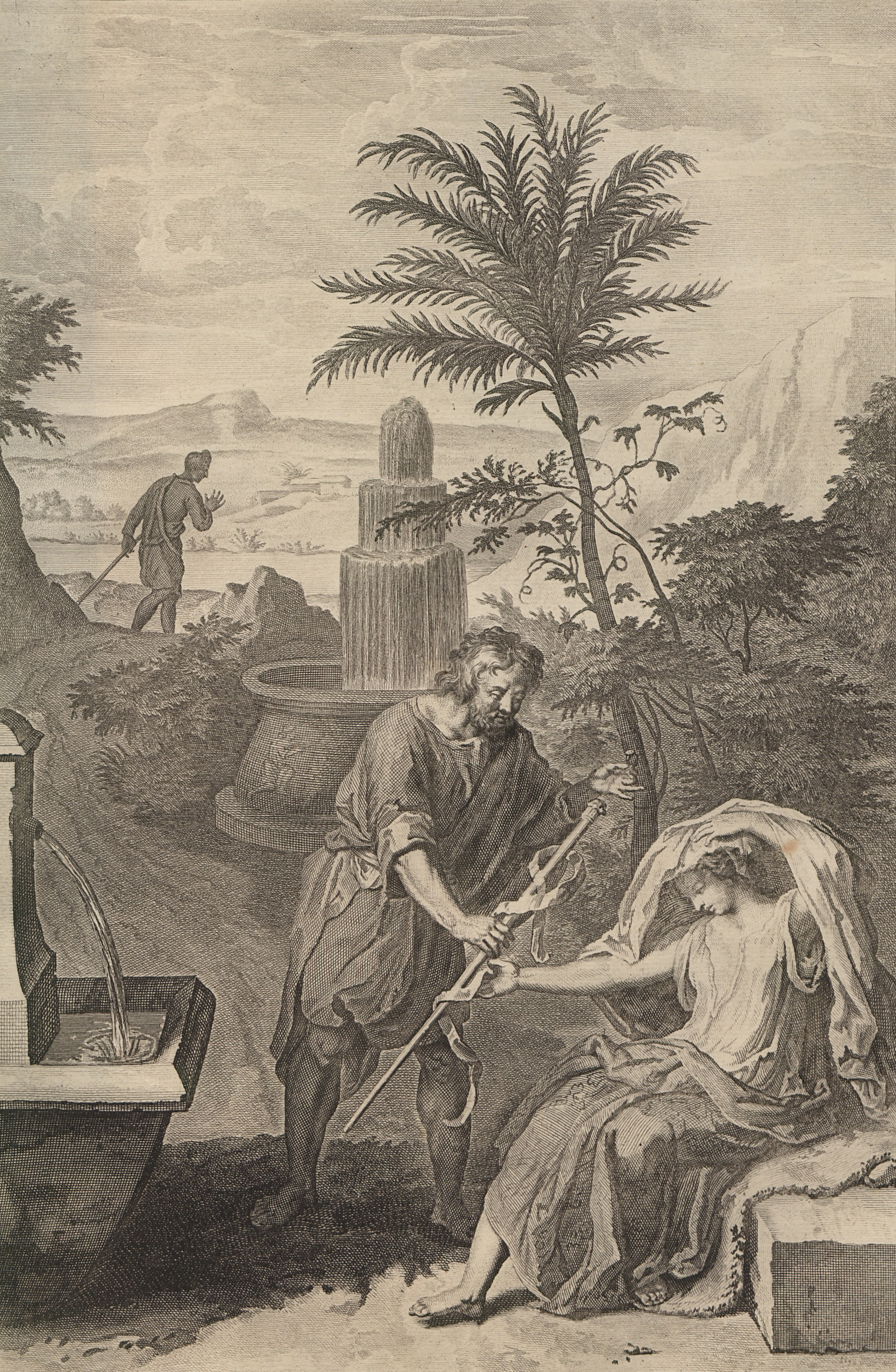
Judah Gives his Signet, Bracelets and Staff in Pledge to Tamar (illustration from the 1728 Figures de la Bible)

=== Genesis chapter 38 ===
The Mishnah taught that notwithstanding its mature content, in the synagogue, Jews read and translated Tamar's story in Genesis 38. The Gemara questioned why the Mishnah bothered to say so and proposed that one might think that Jews should forbear out of respect for Judah. But the Gemara deduced that the Mishnah instructed that Jews read and translate the chapter to show that the chapter actually redounds to Judah's credit, as it records in Genesis 38:26 that he confessed his wrongdoing.

Rabbi Berekiah taught in the name of Rabbi Samuel bar Nahman that the term "and he went down" (וַיֵּרֶד, vayered), which appears in Genesis 38:1, implies excommunication. The Midrash told that when Joseph's brothers tried to comfort Jacob and he refused to be comforted, they told Jacob that Judah was responsible. They said that had Judah only told them not to sell Joseph, they would have obeyed. But Judah told them that they should sell Joseph to the Ishmaelites (as reported in Genesis 37:27). As a result, the brothers excommunicated Judah (when they saw the grief that they had caused Jacob), for Genesis 38:1 says, "And it came to pass at that time, that Judah went down (וַיֵּרֶד, vayered) from his brethren." The Midrash argued that Genesis 38:1 could have said "and he went" (וַיֵּלֶךְ, vayelekh) instead of "and he went down" (וַיֵּרֶד, vayered). Thus the Midrash deduced that Judah suffered a descent and was excommunicated by his brothers.

Rabbi Samuel bar Naḥmani taught that Judah buried his wife and two sons (as reported in Genesis 38:7, 10, and 12) because he did not complete the act of saving Joseph.

Rav Naḥman bar Isaac read the report of Genesis 38:10 that God "slew him also" to indicate that Onan, also, died the same death for performing the same transgression as his brother Er.

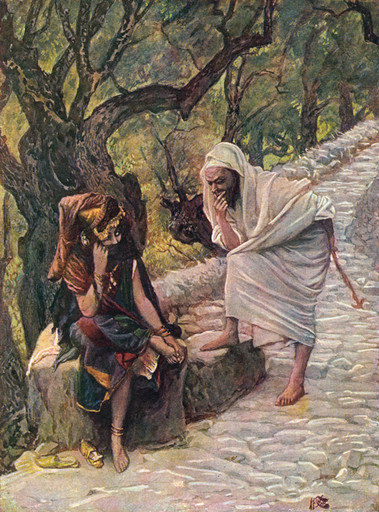
Judah and Tamar (watercolor circa 1896–1902 by James Tissot)

Noting that Judges 14:1 reports that "Samson went down to Timnah," the Gemara asked why Genesis 38:13 says, "Behold, your father-in-law goes up to Timnah." Rabbi Eleazar explained that since Samson was disgraced in Timnah (in that he married a Philistine woman from there), Judges 14:1 reports that he "went down." But since Judah was exalted by virtue of having gone to Timnah (in that, as Genesis 38:29 reports, from Judah's encounter there, Tamar bore Perez, a progenitor of King David), Genesis 38:13 reports that he went "up." Rabbi Samuel bar Nahmani, however, taught that there were two places named Timnah, one that people reached by going down and the other that people reached by going up. And Rav Papa taught that there was only one place named Timnah, and those who came to it from one direction had to descend, while those who came from another direction had to ascend.

Reading the report of Tamar in Genesis 38:14, "She sat in the gate of Enaim," Rabbi Alexander taught that Tamar went and sat at the entrance of the place of Abraham, the place to which all eyes (עֵינַיִם, einaim) look. Alternatively, Rav Hanin said in the name of Rav that there is a place called Enaim, and it is the same place mentioned in Joshua 15:34 when it speaks of "Tappuah and Enam." Alternatively, Rabbi Samuel bar Nahmani taught that the place is called Enaim because Tamar gave eyes (עֵינַיִם, einaim) to her words; that is, Tamar gave convincing replies to Judah's questions. When Judah solicited her, he asked her if she was a Gentile, and she replied that she was a convert. When Judah asked her if she was a married woman, she replied that she was unmarried. When Judah asked her if perhaps her father had accepted marriage proposals on her behalf betrothals (making her forbidden to Judah), she replied that she was an orphan. When Judah asked her if perhaps she was ritually unclean (because she was a menstruant, or niddah, and thus forbidden to Judah), she replied that she was clean.

Reading the report of Genesis 38:15, "he thought her to be a harlot; for she had covered her face," the Gemara questioned how that could be so, for the Rabbis considered covering one's face an act of modesty. Rabbi Eleazar explained that Tamar had covered her face in her father-in-law's house (and thus Judah had never seen her face and did not recognize her), for Rabbi Samuel bar Nahmani said in the name of Rabbi Jonathan that every daughter-in-law who is modest in her father-in-law's house merits that kings and prophets should issue from her. In support of that proposition, the Gemara noted that kings descended from Tamar through David. And prophets descended from Tamar, as Isaiah 1:1 says, "The vision of Isaiah the son of Amoz," and Rabbi Levi taught that there is a tradition that Amoz was the brother of Amaziah the King of Judah, and thus a descendant of David and thus of Tamar.

Reading the words of Genesis 38:25, "When she was brought forth (מוּצֵאת, mutzeit)," the Gemara taught that Genesis 38:25 should rather be read, "When she found (מיתוצאת, mitutzaet)." Rabbi Eleazar explained that the verb thus implies that after Tamar's proofs—Judah's signet, cord, and staff—were found, Samael (the angel of evil) removed them and the archangel Gabriel restored them. Reading the words of Psalm 56:1 as, "For the Chief Musician, the silent dove of them that are afar off. Of David, Michtam," Rabbi Johanan taught that when Samael removed Tamar's proofs, she became like a silent dove.

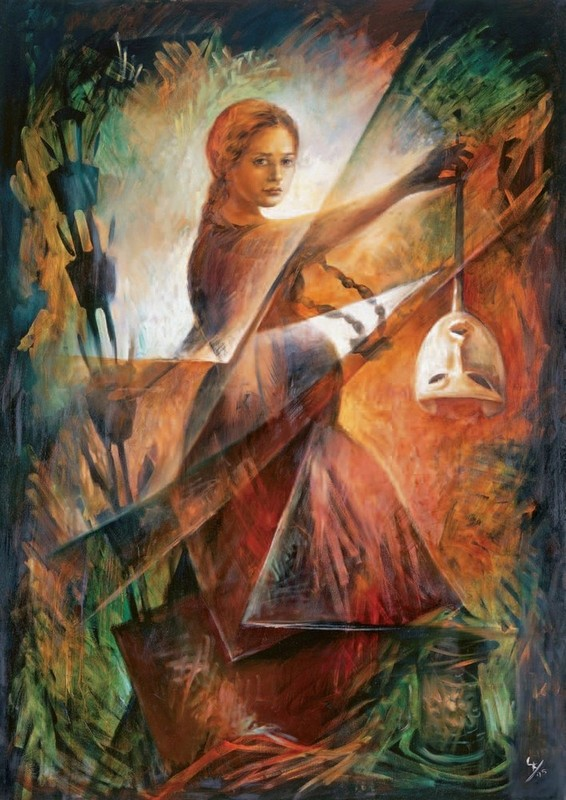
Tamar (2009 painting by and copyright Lidia Kozenitzky; for licensing information, double-click on the image)

Rav Zutra bar Tobiah said in the name of Rav (or according to others, Rav Hanah bar Bizna said it in the name of Rabbi Simeon the Pious, or according to others, Rabbi Johanan said in the name of Rabbi Simeon ben Yohai) that it is better for a person to choose to be executed in a fiery furnace than to shame another in public. For even to save herself from being burned, Tamar in Genesis 38:25 did not implicate Judah publicly by name.

Similarly, the Gemara derived from Genesis 38:25 a lesson about how to give to the poor. The Gemara told a story. A poor man lived in Mar Ukba's neighborhood, and every day Mar Ukba would put four zuz into the poor man's door socket. One day, the poor man thought that he would try to find out who did him this kindness. That day Mar Ukba came home from the house of study with his wife. When the poor man saw them moving the door to make their donation, the poor man went to greet them, but they fled and ran into a furnace from which the fire had just been swept. They did so because, as Mar Zutra bar Tobiah said in the name of Rav (or others say Rav Huna bar Bizna said in the name of Rabbi Simeon the Pious, and still others say Rabbi Johanan said in the name of Rabbi Simeon ben Yohai), it is better for a person to go into a fiery furnace than to shame a neighbor publicly. One can derive this from Genesis 38:25, where Tamar, who was subject to being burned for the adultery with which Judah had charged her, rather than publicly shame Judah with the facts of his complicity, sent Judah's possessions to him with the message, "By the man whose these are am I with child."

Reading the word "please" (נָא, na) in Genesis 38:25, the Gemara taught that Tamar was saying to Judah, "I beg of you, discern the face of your Creator and do not hide your eyes from me."

A Midrash taught that the words "Judah, you shall your brothers praise (יוֹדוּךָ, yoducha)" in Genesis 49:8 signify that because Judah confessed (the same word as "praise") in Genesis 38:26, in connection with Tamar, Judah's brothers would praise Judah in this world and in the world to come (accepting descendants of Judah as their king). And in accordance with Jacob's blessing, 30 kings descended from Judah, for as Ruth 4:18 reports, David descended from Judah, and if one counts David, Solomon, Rehoboam, Abijah, Asa, Jehoshaphat and his successors until Jeconiah and Zedekiah (one finds 30 generations from Judah's son Perez to Zedekiah). And so the Midrash taught it shall be in the world to come (the Messianic era), for as Ezekiel 37:25 foretells, "And David My servant shall be their prince forever."

Rabbi Johanan noted a similarity between the Hebrew verb "to break" and the name "Perez" (פָּרֶץ) in Genesis 38:29 and deduced that the name presaged that kings would descend from him, for a king breaks for himself a way. Rabbi Johanan also noted that the name "Zerah" (זָרַח) in Genesis 38:30 is related to the Hebrew root meaning "to shine" and deduced that the name presaged that important men would descend from him.

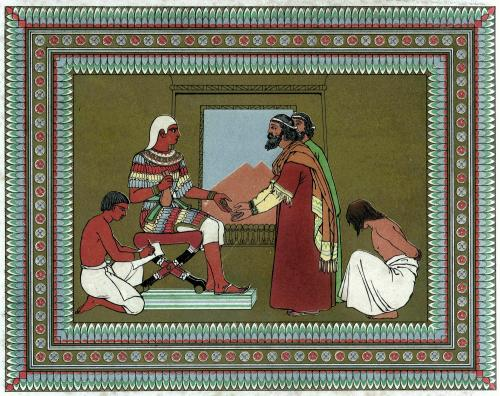
The Midianites sold Joseph into Egypt to Potiphar. (illustration by Owen Jones from the 1869 "The History of Joseph and His Brethren")

=== Genesis chapter 39 ===
Reading the words of Genesis 39:1, “And Potiphar, an officer (סְרִיס, seris) of Pharaoh's, bought him,” Rav taught that Potiphar bought Joseph for himself (to make Joseph his lover), but the archangel Gabriel castrated Potiphar (as the Hebrew word for “officer,” סְרִיס, seris, also means “eunuch”) and then mutilated Potiphar, for originally Genesis 39:1 records his name as “Potiphar,” but afterwards Genesis 41:45 records his name as “Potiphera” (and the ending of his name, פֶרַע, fera, alludes to the word feirio, indicating his mutilation).

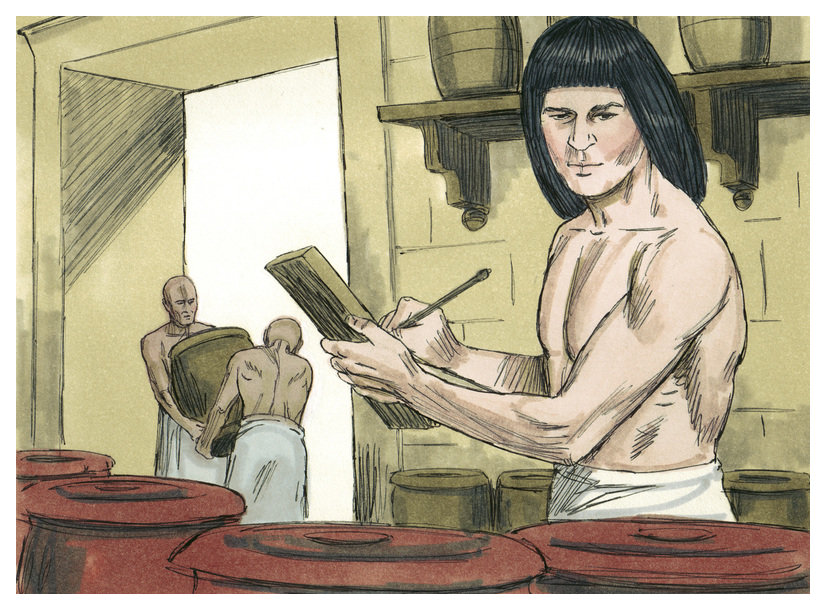
God gave Joseph a special talent for organizing his work. (1984 illustration by Jim Padgett, courtesy of Distant Shores Media/Sweet Publishing)

A Midrash taught that from the moment Joseph arrived in Potiphar's house (in the words of Genesis 39:2–3), "The Lord was with Joseph, and he was successful . . . and his master saw that the Lord was with him." But the Midrash questioned whether the wicked Potiphar could see that God was with Joseph. So the Midrash interpreted the words "the Lord was with Joseph" in Genesis 39:2 to mean that God's Name never left Joseph's lips. When Joseph came to minister to Potiphar, he would whisper a prayer that God grant him favor in God's eyes and in the eyes of all who saw him. Potiphar asked Joseph what he was whispering and whether Joseph was employing sorcery against him. Joseph replied that he was praying that he should find favor with Potiphar. Thus Genesis 39:3 reports, "His master saw that the Lord was with him."

Rabbi Phinehas taught in Rabbi Simon's name that the words, "And the Lord was with Joseph," in Genesis 39:2 demonstrated that Joseph brought the Divine Presence (שכינה, Shechinah) down to Egypt with him.

A Midrash asked whether the words of Genesis 39:2, "And the Lord was with Joseph," implied that God was not with the other tribal ancestors. Rabbi Judan compared this to a drover who had twelve cows before him laden with wine. When one of the cows entered a shop belonging to a nonbeliever, the drover left the eleven and followed the one into the nonbeliever's shop. When asked why he left the eleven to follow the one, he replied that he was not concerned that wine carried by the eleven in the street would be rendered impure because it was used for idolatry, but he was concerned that the wine carried into the nonbeliever's shop might be. Similarly, Jacob's other sons were grown up and under their father's control, but Joseph was young and away from his father's supervision. Therefore, in the words of Genesis 39:2, "the Lord was with Joseph."

The Tosefta deduced from Genesis 39:5 that before Joseph arrived, Potiphar's house had not received a blessing, and that it was because of Joseph's arrival that Potiphar's house was blessed thereafter.

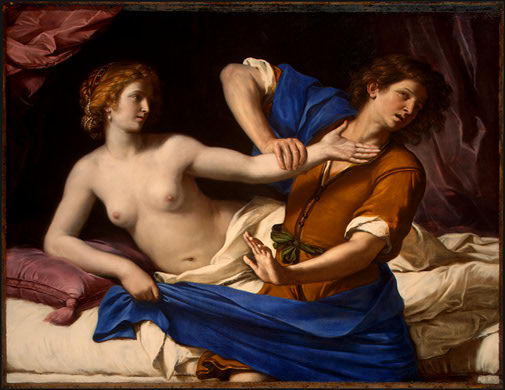
Joseph and Potiphar's Wife (1649 painting by Guercino at the National Gallery of Art)

The Pesikta Rabbati taught that Joseph guarded himself against lechery and murder. That he guarded himself against lechery is demonstrated by the report of him in Genesis 39:8–9, "But he refused, and said to his master's wife: 'Behold, my master, having me, knows not what is in the house, and he has put all that he has into my hand; he is not greater in this house than I; neither has he kept back anything from me but you, because you are his wife. How then can I do this great wickedness, and sin against God?" That he guarded himself against murder is demonstrated by his words in Genesis 50:20, "As for you, you meant evil against me; but God meant it for good."

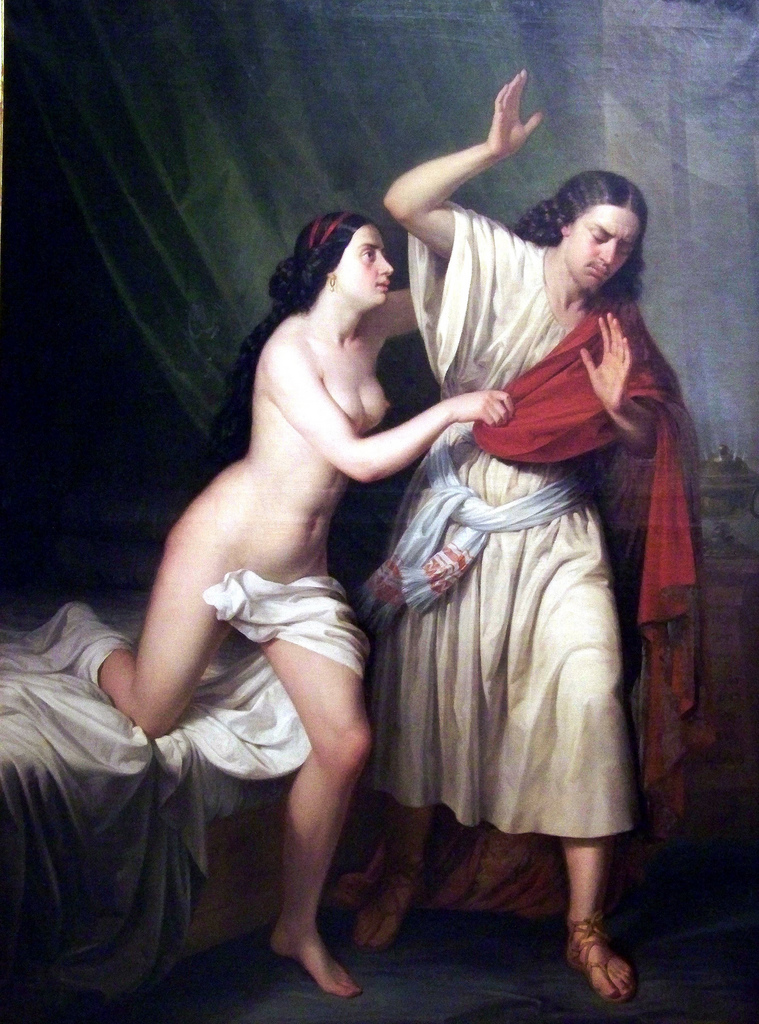
José y la mujer de Putifar (1854 painting by Antonio María Esquivel)

A Midrash applied the words of Ecclesiastes 8:4, "the king's word has power (שִׁלְטוֹן, shilton)" to Joseph's story. The Midrash taught that God rewarded Joseph for resisting Potiphar's wife (as reported in Genesis 39:8) by making him ruler (הַשַּׁלִּיט, hashalit) over the land of Egypt (as reported in Genesis 42:6). "The king's word" of Ecclesiastes 8:4 were manifest when, as Genesis 41:17 reports, "Pharaoh spoke to Joseph: In my dream . . . ." And the word "power (שִׁלְטוֹן, shilton)" of Ecclesiastes 8:4 corresponds to the report of Genesis 42:6, "And Joseph was the governor (הַשַּׁלִּיט, hashalit) over the land." The words of Ecclesiastes 8:4, "And who may say to him: ‘What are you doing?'" are thus reflected in Pharaoh's words of Genesis 41:55, "Go to Joseph; what he says to you, do." The Midrash taught that Joseph received so much honor because he observed the commandments, as Ecclesiastes 8:5 teaches when it says, "Whoever keeps the commandment shall know no evil thing."

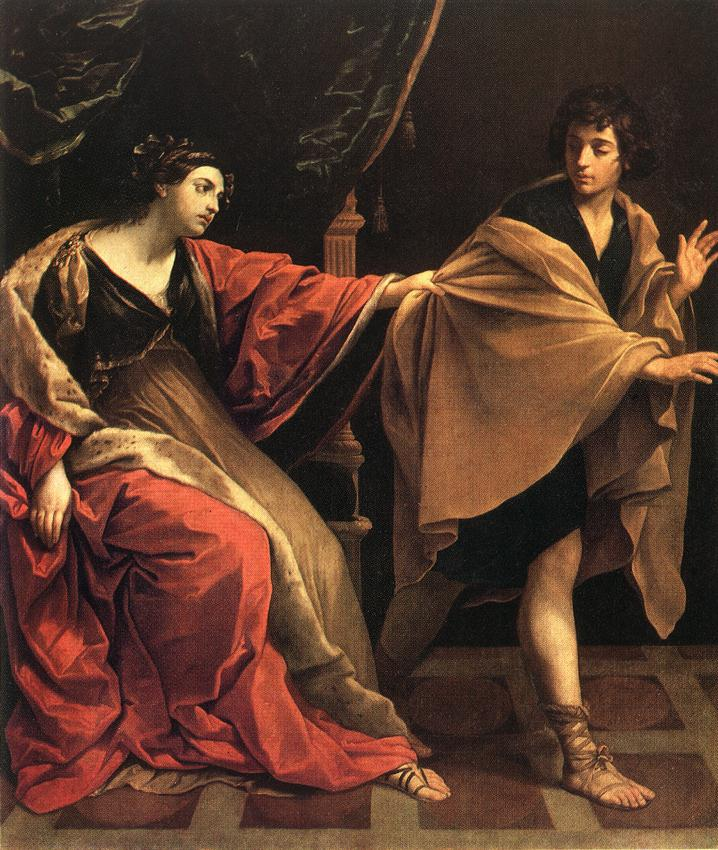
Joseph and Potiphar's Wife (1631 painting by Guido Reni)

Rav Hana (or some say Hanin) bar Bizna said in the name of Rabbi Simeon the Pious that because Joseph sanctified God's Name in private when he resisted Potiphar's wife's advances, one letter from God's Name was added to Joseph's name. Rabbi Johanan interpreted the words, "And it came to pass about this time, that he went into the house to do his work," in Genesis 39:11 to teach that both Joseph and Potiphar's wife had the intention to act immorally. Rav and Samuel differed in their interpretation of the words "he went into the house to do his work." One said that it really means that Joseph went to do his household work, but the other said that Joseph went to satisfy his desires. Interpreting the words, "And there was none of the men of the house there within," in Genesis 39:11, the Gemara asked whether it was possible that no man was present in a huge house like Potiphar's. A Baraita was taught in the School of Rabbi Ishmael that the day was Potiphar's household's feast-day, and they had all gone to their idolatrous temple, but Potiphar's wife had pretended to be ill, because she thought that she would not again have an opportunity like that day to associate with Joseph. The Gemara taught that just at the moment reported in Genesis 39:12 when "she caught him by his garment, saying: ‘Lie with me,' Jacob's image came and appeared to Joseph through the window. Jacob told Joseph that Joseph and his brothers were destined to have their names inscribed upon the stones of the ephod, and Jacob asked whether it was Joseph's wish to have his name expunged from the ephod and be called an associate of harlots, as Proverbs 29:3 says, "He that keeps company with harlots wastes his substance." Immediately, in the words of Genesis 49:24, "his bow abode in strength." Rabbi Johanan said in the name of Rabbi Meir that this means that his passion subsided. And then, in the words of Genesis 49:24, "the arms of his hands were made active," meaning that he stuck his hands in the ground and his lust went out from between his fingernails.

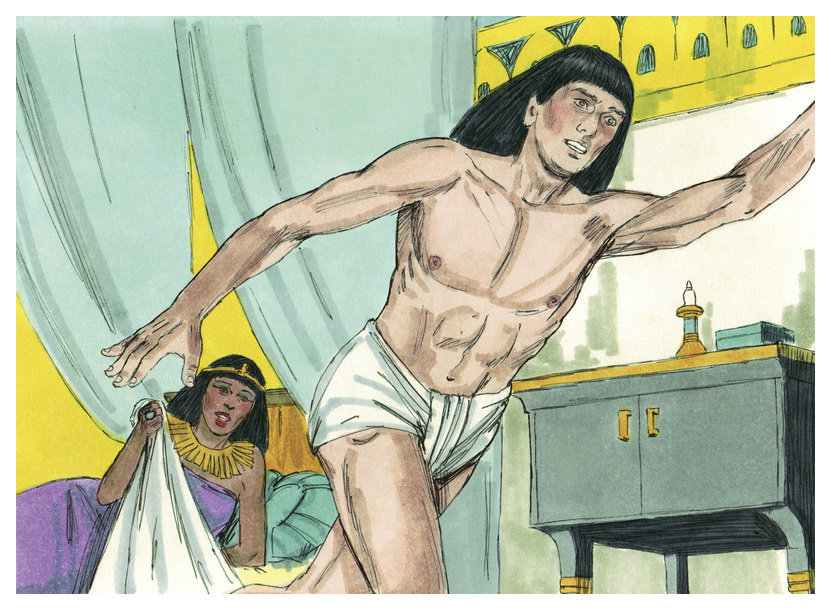
Joseph ran from the house. (1984 illustration by Jim Padgett, courtesy of Distant Shores Media/Sweet Publishing)

Rabbi Johanan said that he would sit at the gate of the bathhouse (mikvah), and when Jewish women came out, they would look at him and have children as handsome as he was. The Rabbis asked him whether he was not afraid of the evil eye for being so boastful. He replied that the evil eye has no power over the descendants of Joseph, citing the words of Genesis 49:22, "Joseph is a fruitful vine, a fruitful vine above the eye [alei ayin]." Rabbi Abbahu taught that one should not read alei ayin ("by a fountain"), but olei ayin ("rising over the eye"). Rabbi Judah (or some say Jose) son of Rabbi Haninah deduced from the words "And let them [the descendants of Joseph] multiply like fishes [ve-yidgu] in the midst of the earth" in Genesis 48:16 that just as fish (dagim) in the sea are covered by water and thus the evil eye has no power over them, so the evil eye has no power over the descendants of Joseph. Alternatively, the evil eye has no power over the descendants of Joseph because the evil eye has no power over the eye that refused to enjoy what did not belong to it—Potiphar's wife—as reported in Genesis 39:7–12.

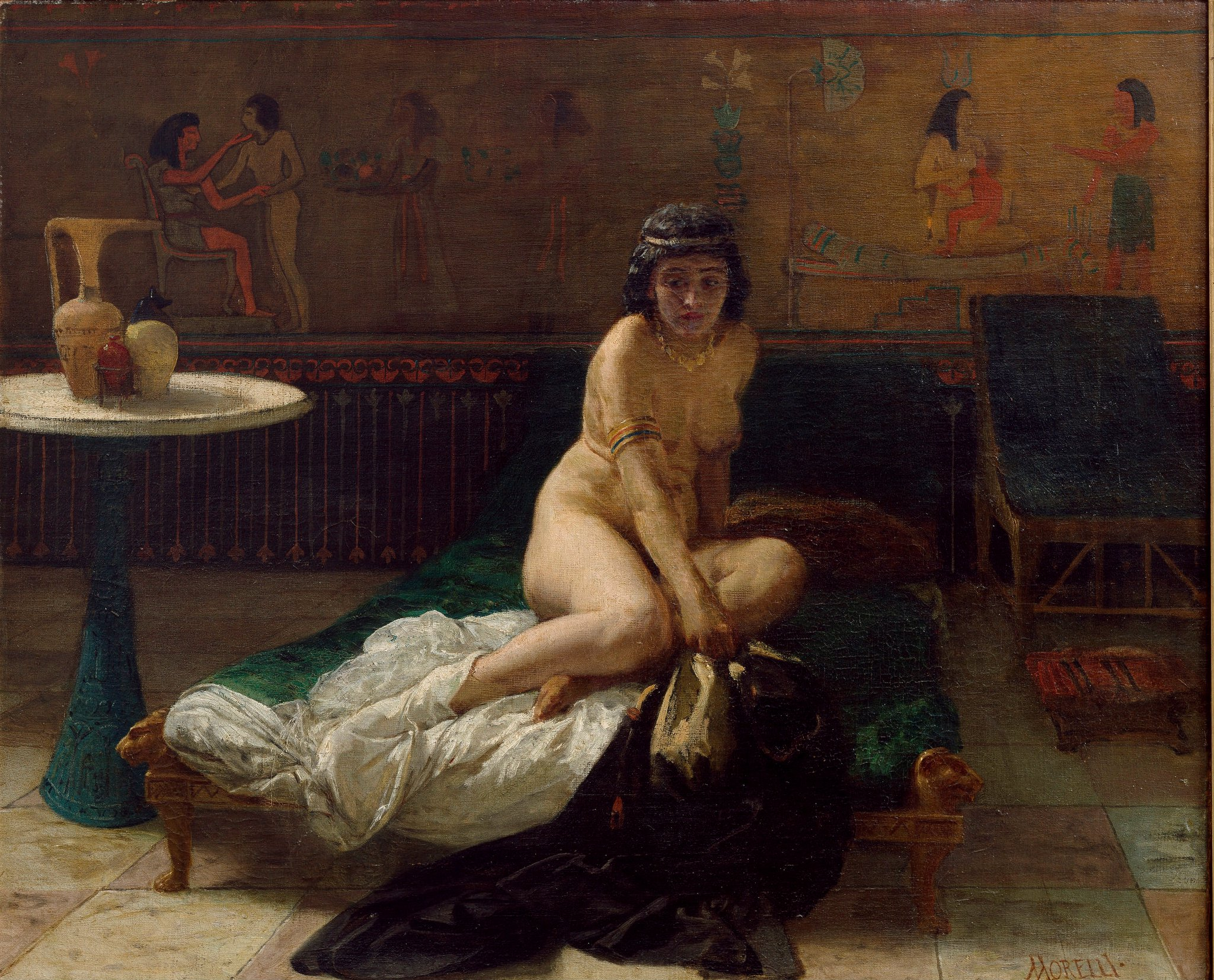
Potiphar's Wife (1861 painting by Domenico Morelli)

The Gemara asked whether the words in Exodus 6:25, "And Eleazar Aaron's son took him one of the daughters of Putiel to wife" did not convey that Eleazar's son Phinehas descended from Jethro, who fattened (piteim) calves for idol worship. The Gemara then provided an alternative explanation: Exodus 6:25 could mean that Phinehas descended from Joseph, who conquered (pitpeit) his passions (resisting Potiphar's wife, as reported in Genesis 39). But the Gemara asked, did not the tribes sneer at Phinehas and (as reported in Babylonian Talmud Sanhedrin 82b and Sotah 43a) question how a youth (Phinehas) whose mother's father crammed calves for idol-worship could kill the head of a tribe in Israel (Zimri, Prince of Simeon, as reported in Numbers 25). The Gemara explained that the real explanation was that Phinehas descended from both Joseph and Jethro. If Phinehas's mother's father descended from Joseph, then Phinehas's mother's mother descended from Jethro. And if Phinehas's mother's father descended from Jethro, then Phinehas's mother's mother descended from Joseph. The Gemara explained that Exodus 6:25 implies this dual explanation of "Putiel" when it says, "of the daughters of Putiel," because the plural "daughters" implies two lines of ancestry (from both Joseph and Jethro).

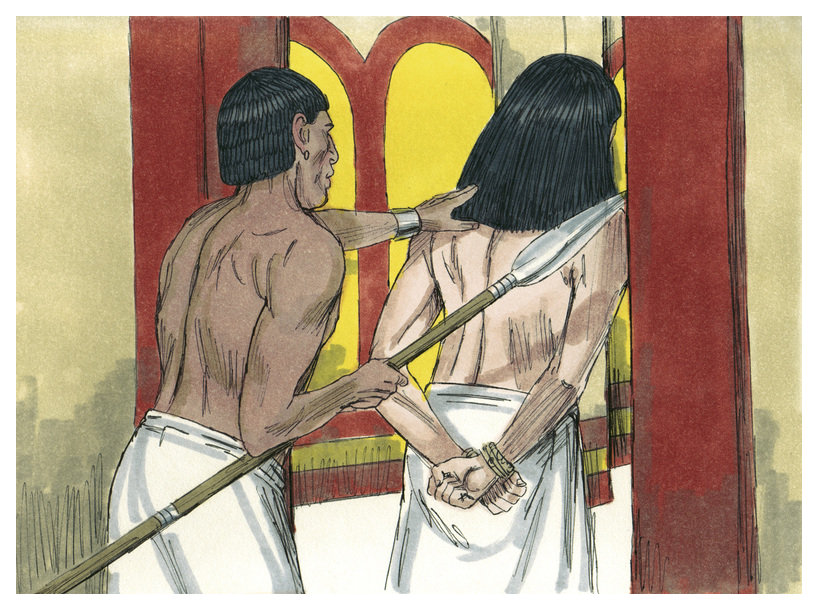
Joseph was imprisoned. (1984 illustration by Jim Padgett, courtesy of Distant Shores Media/Sweet Publishing)

The Mekhilta of Rabbi Ishmael cited Genesis 39:21 for the proposition that whenever Israel is enslaved, the Divine Presence (שכינה, Shechinah) is enslaved with them, as Isaiah 63:9 says, "In all their affliction He was afflicted." The Mekhilta of Rabbi Ishmael taught that God shares the affliction of not only the community, but also of the individual, as Psalm 91:15 says, "He shall call upon Me, and I will answer him; I will be with him in trouble." The Mekhilta of Rabbi Ishmael noted that Genesis 39:20 says, "And Joseph’s master took him," and is immediately followed by Genesis 39:21, "But the Lord was with Joseph."

A Midrash cited the words of Genesis 39:21, “And gave His grace in the sight of the keeper,” as an application to Joseph of the Priestly Blessing of Numbers 6:25, “The Lord . . . be gracious to you.” God imparted of God's grace to Joseph wherever Joseph went.

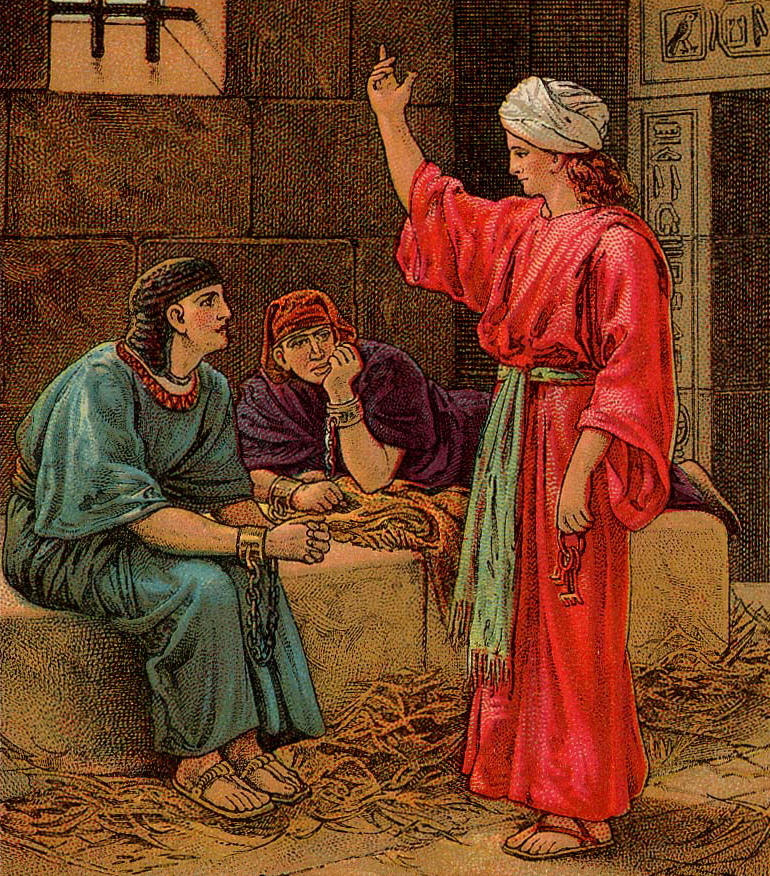
Joseph Faithful in Prison (illustration from a Bible card published 1907 by the Providence Lithograph Company)

The Rabbis of the Midrash debated whether the report of Genesis 39:21, “And the Lord was (וַיְהִי, vayehi) with Joseph,” signified an occurrence of trouble or joy. Rabbi Simeon ben Abba said in the name of Rabbi Johanan that wherever the word "and it came to pass" (וַיְהִי, vayehi) occurs, it signifies the occurrence of either trouble or joy—if of trouble, of unprecedented trouble; if of joy, of unprecedented joy. Rabbi Samuel bar Nahmani made a further distinction that wherever "and it came to pass" (וַיְהִי, vayehi) is found, it refers to trouble; where "and it shall be" (וְהָיָה, vehayah) is found, it refers to joyous occasions. But the Rabbis of the Midrash objected that Genesis 39:21 says, "And the Lord was (וַיְהִי, vayehi) with Joseph"—surely not an indication of trouble. Rabbi Samuel bar Nahmani answered that Genesis 39:21 reported no occasion for joy, as in Genesis 40:15, Joseph recounted, "They . . . put me into the dungeon."

A Midrash taught that Genesis 39:21 reported the source of the kindness that Joseph showed in his life. The Midrash taught that each of the righteous practiced a particular meritorious deed: Abraham practiced circumcision, Isaac practiced prayer, and Jacob practiced truth, as Micah 7:20 says, “You will show truth to Jacob.” The Midrash taught that Joseph stressed kindness, reading Genesis 39:21 to say, “The Lord was with Joseph, and showed kindness to him.”

=== Genesis chapter 40 ===
Rabbi Jeremiah bar Abba saw Exodus 1:7 foreshadowed in the dream of Pharaoh's butler in Genesis 40:10, "And in the vine were three branches; and as it was budding, its blossoms shot forth, and its clusters brought forth ripe grapes." Rabbi Jeremiah taught that "vine" referred to the Jewish people, as Psalm 80:9 says, "You plucked up a vine out of Egypt; You drove out the nations and planted it." And Rabbi Jeremiah read the words of Genesis 40:10, "and as it was budding, its blossoms shot forth," to foretell the time that Exodus 1:7 reports when the Jewish people would be fruitful and multiply.

Rabbi Samuel bar Nahman taught that the Sages instituted the tradition that Jews drink four cups of wine at the Passover seder in allusion to the four cups mentioned in Genesis 40:11–13, which says: "‘Pharaoh's cup was in my hand; and I took the grapes, and pressed them into Pharaoh's cup, and I gave the cup into Pharaoh's hand.' And Joseph said to him: ‘This is the interpretation of it: . . . within yet three days shall Pharaoh lift up your head and restore you to your office; and you shall give Pharaoh's cup into his hand, after the former manner when you were his butler."

Rabbi Eleazar deduced from the report of Genesis 40:16 that "the chief baker saw that the interpretation was correct" that each of them was shown his own dream and the interpretation of the other one's dream.

== In medieval Jewish interpretation ==
The parashah is discussed in these medieval Jewish sources:

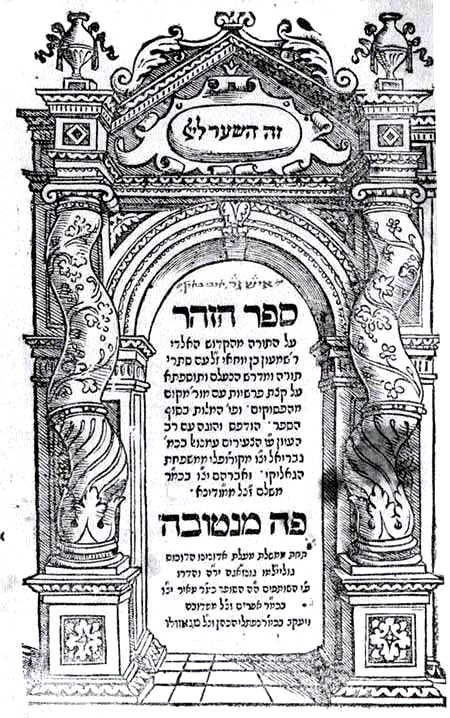
The Title Page of the Zohar

=== Genesis chapter 39 ===
Reading the words of Genesis 39:2, "And the Lord was with Joseph, and he was a prosperous man; and he was in the house of his master the Egyptian," the Zohar taught that wherever the righteous walk, God protects them and never abandons them. The Zohar taught that Joseph walked through "the valley of the shadow of death" (in the words of Psalm 23:4), having been brought down to Egypt, but the Shechinah was with him, as Genesis 39:2 states, "And the Lord was with Joseph." Because of the Shechinah's presence, all that Joseph did prospered in his hand. If he had something in his hand and his master wanted something else, it changed in his hand to the thing that his master wanted. Hence, Genesis 39:3 says, "made to prosper in his hand," as God was with him. Noting that Genesis 39:3 does not say, "And his master knew," but "And his master saw," the Zohar deduced that Potiphar saw every day with his eyes the miracles that God performed by the hand of Joseph. Genesis 39:5 reports, "the Lord blessed the Egyptian's house for Joseph's sake," and the Zohar taught that God guards the righteous, and for their sakes also guards the wicked with whom they are associated, so that the wicked receive blessings through the righteous. The Zohar told that Joseph was thrown into the dungeon, in the words of Psalm 105:18, "His feet they hurt with fetters, his person was laid in iron." And then God liberated him and made him ruler over Egypt, fulfilling the words of Psalm 37:28, which reports that God "forsakes not his saints; they are preserved forever." Thus the Zohar taught that God shields the righteous in this world and in the world to come.

== In modern interpretation ==
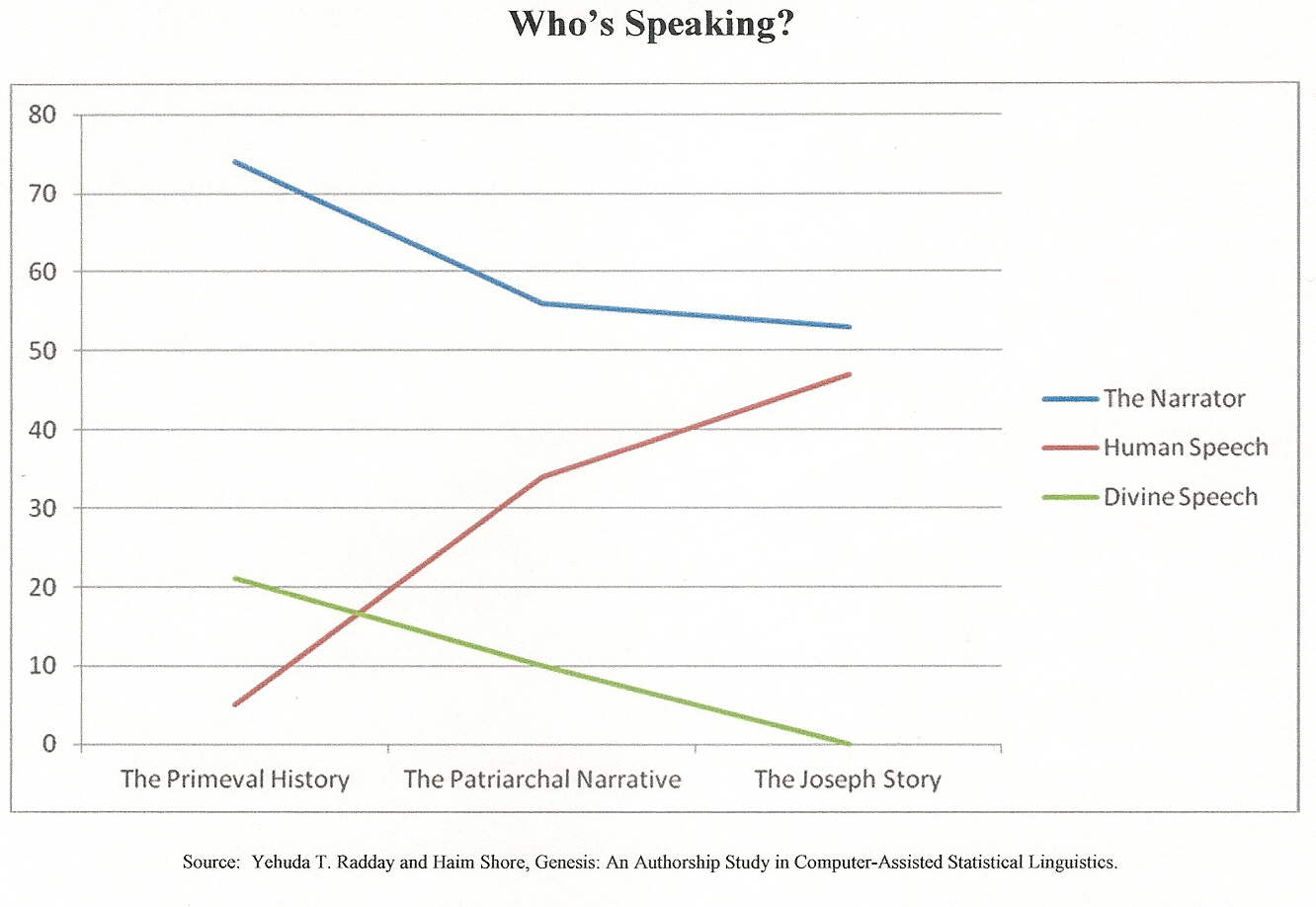

The parashah is discussed in these modern sources:

=== Genesis chapters 37–50 ===
Who's Speaking?	In Primeval History	In Patriarchal Narrative	In the Joseph Story
	Genesis 1–11	Genesis 12–36	Genesis 37–50
The Narrator	74%	56%	53%
Human Speech	5%	34%	47%
Divine Speech	21%	10%	0%

Yehuda Radday and Haim Shore analyzed the 20,504 Hebrew words in Genesis and divided them according to whether they occur in the narrator's description, in direct human speech, or in direct Divine speech. They found that the Joseph story in Genesis 37–50 contains substantially more direct human speech but markedly less direct Divine speech than the Primeval history in Genesis 1–11 and the Patriarchal narrative in Genesis 12–36.

Donald Seybold schematized the Joseph narrative in the chart below, finding analogous relationships in each of Joseph's households.

The Joseph Narrative
	At Home		Potiphar's House		Prison		Pharaoh's Court
Verses	Genesis 37:1–36	Genesis 37:3–33	Genesis 39:1–20	Genesis 39:12–41:14	Genesis 39:20–41:14	Genesis 41:14–50:26	Genesis 41:1–50:26
Ruler	Jacob		Potiphar		Prison-keeper		Pharaoh
Deputy	Joseph		Joseph		Joseph		Joseph
Other "Subjects"	Brothers		Servants		Prisoners		Citizens
Symbols of Position and Transition		Long Sleeved Robe		Cloak		Shaved and Changed Clothes	
Symbols of Ambiguity and Paradox		Pit		Prison		Egypt	

Ephraim Speiser argued that in spite of its surface unity, the Joseph story, on closer scrutiny, yields two parallel strands similar in general outline, yet markedly different in detail. The Jahwist’s version employed the Tetragrammaton and the name “Israel.” In that version, Judah persuaded his brothers not to kill Joseph but sell him instead to Ishmaelites, who disposed of him in Egypt to an unnamed official. Joseph’s new master promoted him to the position of chief retainer. When the brothers were on their way home from their first mission to Egypt with grain, they opened their bags at a night stop and were shocked to find the payment for their purchases. Judah prevailed on his father to let Benjamin accompany them on a second journey to Egypt. Judah finally convinced Joseph that the brothers had really reformed. Joseph invited Israel to settle with his family in Goshen. The Elohist’s parallel account, in contrast, consistently used the names “Elohim” and “Jacob.” Reuben—not Judah—saved Joseph from his brothers; Joseph was left in an empty cistern, where he was picked up, unbeknown to the brothers, by Midianites; they—not the Ishmaelites—sold Joseph as a slave to an Egyptian named Potiphar. In that lowly position, Joseph served—not supervised—the other prisoners. The brothers opened their sacks—not bags—at home in Canaan—not at an encampment along the way. Reuben—not Judah—gave Jacob—not Israel—his personal guarantee of Benjamin’s safe return. Pharaoh—not Joseph—invited Jacob and his family to settle in Egypt—not just Goshen. Speiser concluded that the Joseph story can thus be traced back to two once separate, though now intertwined, accounts.

John Kselman noted that as in the Jacob cycle that precedes it, the Joseph narrative begins with the deception of a father by his offspring through an article of clothing; the deception leads to the separation of brothers for 20 years; and the climax of the story comes with the reconciliation of estranged brothers and the abatement of family strife. Kselman reported that more recent scholarship finds in the Joseph story a background in the Solomonic era, as Solomon’s marriage to a daughter of the pharaoh (reported in 1 Kings 9:16 and 11:1) indicated an era of amicable political and commercial relations between Egypt and Israel that would explain the positive attitude of the Joseph narrative to Egypt.

Gary Rendsburg noted that Genesis often repeats the motif of the younger son. God favored Abel over Cain in Genesis 4; Isaac superseded Ishmael in Genesis 16–21; Jacob superseded Esau in Genesis 25–27; Judah (fourth among Jacob’s sons, last of the original set born to Leah) and Joseph (eleventh in line) superseded their older brothers in Genesis 37–50; Perez superseded Zerah in Genesis 38 and Ruth 4; and Ephraim superseded Manasseh in Genesis 48. Rendsburg explained Genesis’s interest with this motif by recalling that David was the youngest of Jesse’s seven sons (see 1 Samuel 16), and Solomon was among the youngest, if not the youngest, of David’s sons (see 2 Samuel 5:13–16). The issue of who among David’s many sons would succeed him dominates the Succession Narrative in 2 Samuel 13 through 1 Kings 2. Amnon was the firstborn but was killed by his brother Absalom (David’s third son) in 2 Samuel 13:29. After Absalom rebelled, David’s general Joab killed him in 2 Samuel 18:14–15. The two remaining candidates were Adonijah (David’s fourth son) and Solomon, and although Adonijah was older (and once claimed the throne when David was old and feeble in 1 Kings 1), Solomon won out. Rendsburg argued that even though firstborn royal succession was the norm in the ancient Near East, the authors of Genesis justified Solomonic rule by imbedding the notion of ultimogeniture into Genesis’s national epic. An Israelite could thus not criticize David’s selection of Solomon to succeed him as king over Israel, because Genesis reported that God had favored younger sons since Abel and blessed younger sons of Israel—Isaac, Jacob, Judah, Joseph, Perez, and Ephraim—since the inception of the covenant. More generally, Rendsburg concluded that royal scribes living in Jerusalem during the reigns of David and Solomon in the tenth century BCE were responsible for Genesis; their ultimate goal was to justify the monarchy in general, and the kingship of David and Solomon in particular; and Genesis thus appears as a piece of political propaganda.

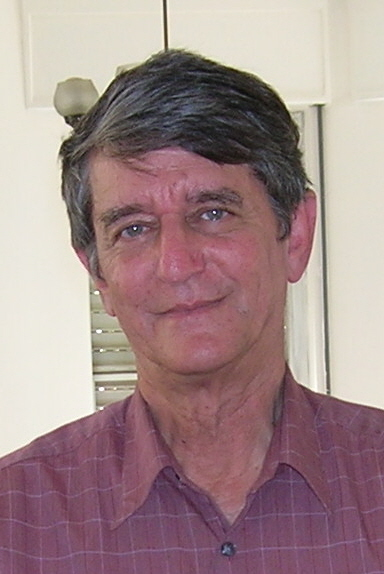
Kugel

Calling it “too good a story,” James Kugel reported that modern interpreters contrast the full-fledged tale of the Joseph story with the schematic narratives of other Genesis figures and conclude that the Joseph story reads more like a work of fiction than history. Donald Redford and other scholars following him suspected that behind the Joseph story stood an altogether invented Egyptian or Canaanite tale that was popular on its own before an editor changed the main characters to Jacob and his sons. These scholars argue that the original story told of a family of brothers in which the father spoiled the youngest, and the oldest brother, who had his own privileged status, intervened to try to save the youngest when his other brothers threatened him. In support of this theory, scholars have pointed to the description of Joseph (rather than Benjamin) in Genesis 37:3 as if he were Jacob's youngest son, Joseph's and Jacob's references to Joseph's mother (as if Rachel were still alive) in Joseph's prophetic dream in Genesis 37:9–10, and the role of the oldest brother Reuben intervening for Joseph in Genesis 37:21–22, 42:22, and 42:37. Scholars theorize that when the editor first mechanically put Reuben in the role of the oldest, but as the tribe of Reuben had virtually disappeared and the audience for the story were principally descendants of Judah, Judah was given the role of spokesman and hero in the end.

Gerhard von Rad argued that the Joseph narrative is closely related to earlier Egyptian wisdom literature. The wisdom ideology maintained that a Divine plan underlay all of reality, so that everything unfolds in accordance with a preestablished pattern—precisely what Joseph says to his brothers in Genesis 44:5 and 50:20. Joseph is the only one of Israel's ancestors whom the Torah (in Genesis 41:39) calls “wise” (חָכָם, chacham)—the same word as “sage” in Hebrew. Specialties of ancient Near Eastern sages included advising the king and interpreting dreams and other signs—just as Joseph did. Joseph displayed the cardinal sagely virtue of patience, which sages had because they believed that everything happens according to the Divine plan and would turn out for the best. Joseph thus looks like the model of an ancient Near Eastern sage, and the Joseph story looks like a didactic tale designed to teach the basic ideology of wisdom.

George Coats argued that the Joseph narrative is a literary device constructed to carry the children of Israel from Canaan to Egypt, to link preexisting stories of ancestral promises in Canaan to an Exodus narrative of oppression in and liberation from Egypt. Coats described the two principal goals of the Joseph story as (1) to describe reconciliation in a broken family despite the lack of merit of any of its members, and (2) to describe the characteristics of an ideal administrator.

Commenting on Genesis 45:5–8 and 50:19–20, Walter Brueggemann wrote that the Joseph story's theme concerns God's hidden and decisive power, which works in, through, and sometimes against human power. Calling this either providence or predestination, Brueggemann argued that God thus worked out God's purpose through and in spite of Egypt, and through and in spite of Joseph and his brothers.

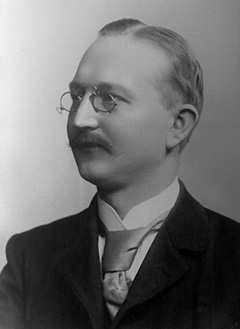
Gunkel

=== Genesis chapter 38 ===
Hermann Gunkel argued that what he called the legend of Tamar in Genesis 38 depicts in part early relations in the tribe of Judah: The Tribe of Judah allied itself with Canaanites who are reflected in the legendary Hirah of Adullam and Judah's wife, Bathshua. According to Gunkel, the accounts of Er and Onan reflect that a number of Judan-Canaanitish tribes perished early. And the accounts of Perez and Zerah reflect that finally two new tribes arose.

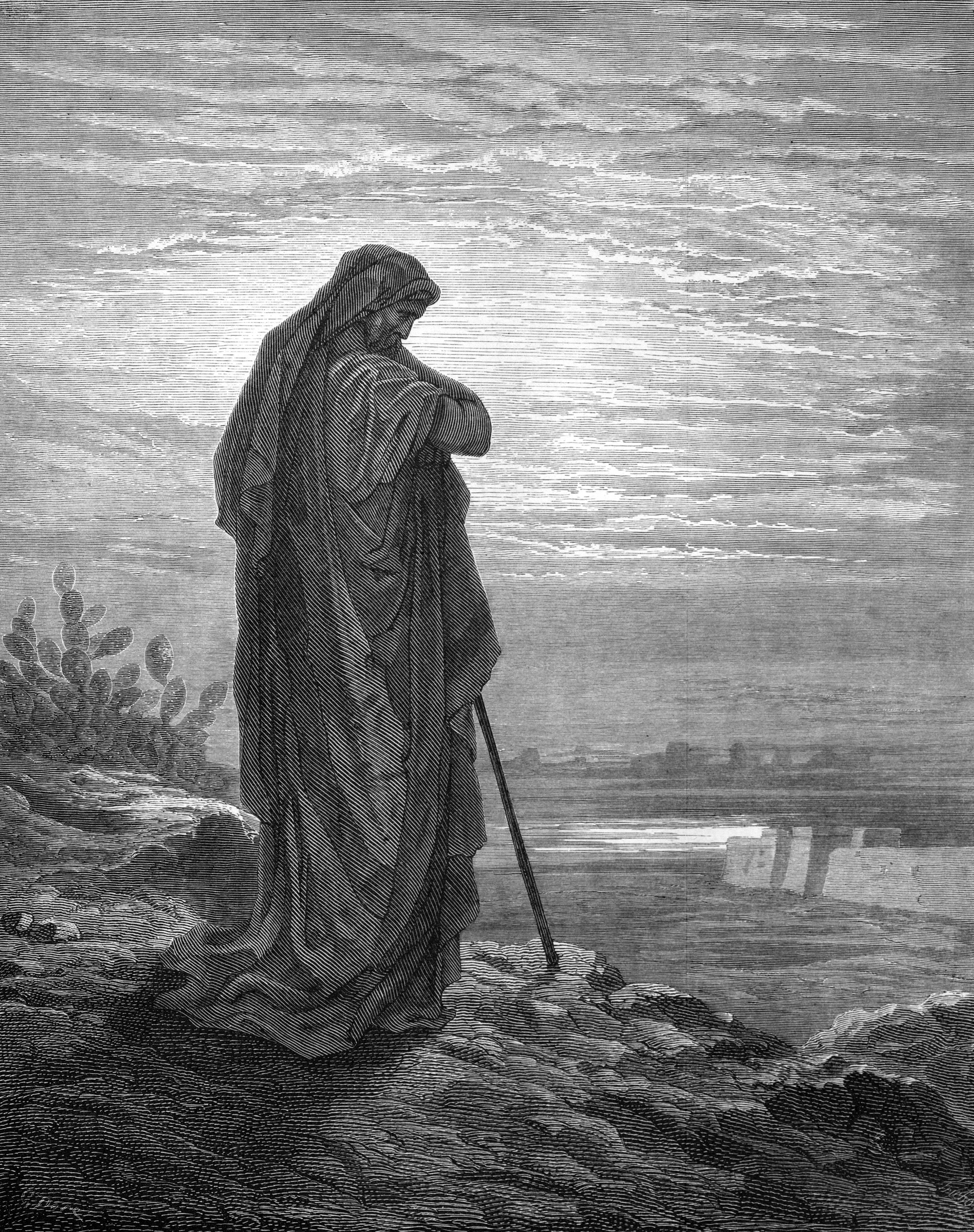
Amos (illustration by Gustave Doré from the 1865 La Sainte Bible)

== Commandments ==
According to Maimonides and Sefer ha-Chinuch, there are no commandments in the parashah.

== Haftarah ==
A haftarah is a text selected from the books of Nevi'im ("The Prophets") that is read publicly in the synagogue after the reading of the Torah on Sabbath and holiday mornings. The haftarah usually has a thematic link to the Torah reading that precedes it.

The specific text read following Parashah Vayeshev varies according to different traditions within Judaism. In general, the haftarah for the parashah is Amos 2:6–3:8.

=== On Shabbat Hanukkah ===
When Rosh Hashanah begins on a Sabbath, either one or two Sabbaths occur during Hanukkah. In such a case, Parashat Vayeshev occurs on the first day of Hanukkah (as it did in 2009) or the second day (as it did in 2020 and 2023) and the haftarah is Zechariah 2:14–4:7.

== See also ==
- Potiphar's wife
- Yusuf and Zulaikha
