= Rabin (amora) =

Rabin or Ravin (Hebrew: רבין), short for Rabbi Abin and also known in the Yerushalmi as Rabbi Abon or Rabbi Bon, was one of the most famous rabbis of the fourth generation of amoraim in the Land of Israel.

== Biography ==
Different stories about his ancestry are recorded. According to Ecclesiastes Rabbah, he was born on the day that Rav Hamnuna, his father, died. In Midrash Shmuel the same story appears, but without mentioning that Hamnuna was his father. In Genesis Rabbah, the same story appears but with R' Ada bar Ahava in place of Rav Hamnuna. Thus, it is difficult to know the actual name of his father. Ravin himself testified that his father died when he was conceived (and his mother died when he was born).

He was Babylonian in origin but seems to have immigrated to the Land of Israel in his youth, where he encountered Rabbi Yochanan and Reish Lakish.

Along with Rav Dimi, he moved to Babylonia bringing many halachic traditions from the rabbis of the Land of Israel; he and Dimi arranged that Dimi would travel first, and therefore the phrase "When Rav Dimi came" in the Talmud is frequently followed by "When Ravin came" and only rarely the reverse. Upon arriving in Babylonia he was seen as a peer to Abaye.

It is likely that R' Yossi bar Bun (colleague of R' Jose bar Zevida) was Ravin's son, though Yossi stayed in the Land of Israel, while Ravin moved to Babylonia and apparently remained there.
