= Rabbi Aha =

4th-century rabbi of the Land of Israel

Rabbi Aha (Hebrew: רבי אחא, read as Rabbi Achah) was a rabbi of the Land of Israel, of the fourth century (fourth generation of amoraim).

== Biography ==
He resided at Lod, but later settled in Tiberias where Huna II, Judah ben Pazi, and himself eventually constituted a beit din. He was also a colleague of Rabbi Jonah and Jose bar Zevida. He was either a kohen or a Levite.

It is said that when he died, the sky darkened to the point that stars were seen at midday.

== Teachings ==
Most of his work on halakha and aggadah is cited in the Jerusalem Talmud and the midrash, and very little is cited in the Babylonian Talmud. He is quoted hundreds of times in the Jerusalem Talmud.

Like his elder namesakes, he was a recognized authority on halakhah; but in aggadah he surpassed them, being by far the most frequently quoted by aggadists of his own times and of subsequent generations.

Commenting on Abraham's attempt to sacrifice Isaac, Aḥa tries to prove that the patriarch misunderstood the divine call. He refers to the verse "My covenant will I not break, nor alter the thing that is gone out of my lips," which he construes thus:

My covenant will I not break, even that covenant in which I have assured Abraham: "In Isaac shall your seed be called", nor alter the thing which is gone out of my lips, when I said to him, "Take now your son". This may be compared to a king who told his friend to place his son on his table. The friend returned with his own child and with a knife in hand. The king exclaimed, "Did I ask you to bring him up to eat? I said to bring him up, because he is loved." Similarly, said the Holy One—blessed be He!—to Abraham: 'Take now thy son, and offer him there for a burnt offering;' whereupon Abraham built an altar, and placed his son upon it. But when he stretched forth his hand for the knife, the angel cried out, 'Lay not thine hand upon the youth.' And when Abraham inquired, 'Didst thou not tell me to offer my son?' the angel retorted, 'Did I tell thee to kill him?'

=== Quotes ===
- When Israel has been reduced to eating only carobs, they make repentance.
- The shekhinah never departs from the western wall.
- Anyone who judges Israel favorably, the Holy One (blessed be He) exalts him in the world.
- The Holy One (blessed be He) is exacting with the righteous to the fineness of a single hair.
