= Jose bar Zevida =

Jose bar Zebida (or Yose b. Zevida; Hebrew: יוסי בר זבידא, read as Yossi bar Zevida) was a Jewish Amora sage of Tiberias, the Land of Israel, of the fourth generation of the Amora era.

He is cited in the Jerusalem Talmud and the Midrash merely as R. Jose.

He often appears in the Babylonian Talmud arguing with R' Yossi bar Bun.

Though he lived in the Land of Israel, he is never mentioned by name in the Jerusalem Talmud. This surprising fact led to the suggestion that all places in which "R. Jose" is named in the Jerusalem Talmud are references to him.
