= Brune =

Brune may refer to:

== People ==
- Brune (surname), a surname
- Brune Poirson (born 1982), French politician
- Brune Pourcel, a French woman in the 14th century
- Brune Tavell (born 1974), Swedish footballer

== Ships ==
- French corvette Brune (1781)
- French frigate Brune (1755)
- French ship Brune, three ships in the French Navy
- HMS Brune, three Royal Navy ships

== Other ==
- Brune Park Community School, Gosport, England
- Brune test, named after Otto Brune
- BB Brunes, a French rock band
- Peyre-Brune, Neolithic dolmen in France
- Prideaux-Brune rescue, a sea rescue off Cornwall, England

== See also ==
- Bruen (surname)
- Brun (surname)
- Brunn (surname)
- Jonatan Braut Brunes (born 2000), Norwegian footballer
- Brunne
