= Bruni (surname) =

Bruni is an Italian surname. Notable people with the surname include:

- Amalia Bruni, Italian politician
- Amedeo Bruni (1906–1991), Italian sports shooter
- Antonio Bruni (poet) (1593–1635), Italian poet
- Antonio Bruni (merchant) (died 1598), Albanian merchant
- Antoine Bruni d'Entrecasteaux (1737–1793), French naval officer, explorer and colonial governor
- Antonio Bartolomeo Bruni (1757–1821), Italian violist, composer and conductor
- Arturo Bruni, known professionally as Side Baby (born 1994), Italian rapper
- Bruno Bruni (artist) (born 1935), Italian artist
- Bruno Bruni (athlete) (born 1955), Italian high jumper
- Carla Bruni (born 1967), Italian-French model, singer and third wife of Nicolas Sarkozy, former President of France
- Celestino Bruni O.S.A. (XVII century), Bishop of Boiano
- Dino Bruni (born 1932), Italian road cyclist
- Domenico Bruni (1600–1666), Italian painter of the Baroque period, mainly active in Brescia
- Emily Bruni (born 1975), English actress
- Ferruccio Bruni (1899–1971), Italian middle-distance runner
- Francesco Bruni (linguist) (1943–2025), Italian linguist and historian
- Francesco Bruni (disambiguation), several people
- Frank Bruni (born 1964), American journalist and long-time writer for The New York Times
- Fyodor Bruni (1799–1875), Russian painter of Italian origin
- Gabriele Bruni (born 1974), Italian sailor
- Geronimo Bruni (XVII century), Italian painter, pupil of Jacques Courtois
- Gian Giacomo Bruni (died 1507), Bishop of Nepi e Sutri
- Gianmaria Bruni (born 1981), Italian racing driver
- Giovanni Bruni (1500–1531), Albanian Bishop of Bar from Ulcinj
- Giovanni Bruni, designer of the Bruni 3V-1 Eolo glider
- Gustavo Maria Bruni (1903–1911), Italian boy under canonisation by the Roman Catholic Church
- Jorge Bruni (1941–2020), Uruguayan politician
- Leonardo Bruni (c. 1370–1444), humanist, historian and chancellor of Florence
- Loïc Bruni (born 1994), professional downhill mountain biker
- Ludovic Bruni (born 1976), French guitarist, bassist and music producer
- Massimo Bruni Corvino (d. 1522), Roman Catholic Bishop of Isernia
- Matteo Bruni (born 1976), Italian-British media professional
- Orazio Bruni (born c. 1630), Italian engraver
- Paolo Emilio Bruni (died 1506), Bishop of Nepi e Sutri (1507–1516)
- Rachele Bruni (born 1990), Italian swimmer
- Romulo Bruni (1871–1939), Italian cyclist
- Roberta Bruni (born 1994), Italian pole vaulter
- Rodrigo Bruni (born 1993), Argentine rugby union player of the national Argentina team
- Sergio Bruni (1921–2003), Italian singer, guitarist, and songwriter
- Teofilo Bruni (1569–1638), Italian mathematician and astronomer
- Umberto Bruni (1914–2021), Canadian artist and painter
- Valeria Bruni Tedeschi (born 1964), Italian-French actress and sister of Carla Bruni
- Virgile Bruni (born 1989), French rugby union player

== Others ==
- Bruni Löbel (1920–2006), German stage, film and television actress

== See also ==
- Bruna (surname)
- Brune (surname)
- Bruno (surname)
