= Brune (surname) =

Brune is a surname. As a German surname, it ultimately derived from "brown". Notable people with the name include:

- Adolf Brune (1870–1935), German-born American composer
- Adolphe Brune (1802–1880), French artist
- Aidan de Brune (1874–1946), Australian journalist and walker
- Andreas Brune (born 1960), German microbiologist
- Charles Brune (cricketer) (1843–1877), English cricketer
- Charles Brune (politician) (1891–1956), French vet and politician
- Elisa Brune (1966–2018), Belgian writer
- François Brune (born 1940), French author and professor
- François Brune (priest) (1931–2019), French Catholic priest
- Frederick Brune (1894–1972), American jurist
- Gabrielle Brune (1912–2005), British actress
- Guillaume Brune (1764–1815), French military commander
- Ian Brune (1949–2014), South African cricketer
- Jesse Brune (born 1980), American chef, trainer and coach
- Larry Brune (born 1953), American footballer
- Michael Brune (born 1971), American executive director
- Minnie Tittell Brune (1875–1974), American actress
- Nick Brune (born 1952), English-born Canadian educator etc.
- Otto Brune (1901–1982), South African researcher
- Shalom Brune-Franklin (born 1994), English-born Australian actress
- Theodore Brune (1854–1932), German-American architect
- Walter Brune (1926–2021), German architect etc.

== See also ==
- Brune (disambiguation)
- Bruna (surname)
- Bruni (surname)
- Bruno (surname)
