= Bruna (name) =

Bruna is a feminine given name and a surname. Notable people with the name include:

== Surname ==
- Annika Bruna (born 1956), French politician
- Antonio Bruna (1895–1976), Italian footballer
- Dick Bruna (1927–2017), Dutch author, artist, illustrator and graphic designer
- Cindy Bruna (born 1994), French fashion model
- Edgardo Bruna (1947–2017), Chilean actor
- Enrico Bruna (1880–1921), Italian rower
- Gerardo Bruna (born 1991), Argentinian footballer
- Giulia Bogliolo Bruna, Italian ethno-historian
- Henk Bruna (1916–2008), Dutch publisher and director of the Bruna retailing chain
- Israel Bruna, also known as Mahari Bruna (1400–1480), German Rabbi and Posek (decisor on Jewish Law)
- Maria Bruna (born 1984), Spanish mathematician
- María Rafols Bruna (1781–1853), Spanish Roman Catholic nun and mystic
- Pablo Bruna (1611–1679), Spanish composer and organist
- Paola Bruna (born 1973), Swedish artist and singer of Chilean origin
- Rav Berona, also known as Rav Bruna, 3rd-century Babylonian rabbi

== Given name ==
- Bruna (footballer, born 1984) (born 1984), Brazilian footballer
- Bruna Benites (born 1985), Brazilian footballer
- Bruna Duvančić (born 2004), Croatian taekwondo practitioner
- Bruna Lombardi (born 1952) Brazilian actress and writer
- Bruna Hamú (born 1990), Brazilian actress
- Bruna Linzmeyer (born 1992), Brazilian actress
- Bruna Marquezine (born 1995), Brazilian model
- Bruna Moura (born 1994), Brazilian cross-country skier
- Bruna Papandrea (born 1971), Australian film and television producer
- Bruna Tenório (born 1989), Brazilian model
- Bruna Vilamala (born 2002), Spanish footballer
- Bruna Wurts (born 2000), Brazilian artistic roller skater
- Bruninha (born Bruna Santos Nhaia 2002), Brazilian footballer

== See also ==
- Bruna (disambiguation)
- Brunna
- Brune (surname)
- Bruni (surname)
- Bruno (surname)
- František Brůna (1944–2017), Czech handball player
