= Hama bar Ukva =

Israeli rabbi, 3rd generation Amora

- רבי חמא בר עוקבא

Personal life
- Born: 3rd century
- Died: 4th century Syria Palaestina
- Era: Third generation of amoraim

Religious life
- Religion: Judaism

Jewish leader
- Teacher: Jose bar Hanina
- Students: Yossi bar Zavida, Jeremiah (III)

Hama bar Ukva (Hebrew: חמא בר עוקבא) was a third-generation Israeli Amora who flourished between 290–320 CE.

== Biography ==
Rabbi Hama bar Ukva was a student of Rabbi Jose bar Hanina, and often quotes teachings in his name. He also passed on teachings from Reish Lakish and Rabbi Joshua ben Levi.

His colleagues were Rabbi Zeira and Rabbi Levi. Abaye, Rabbi Jonah, Rabbi Yossi bar Zavida and Rabbi Jeremiah (III) repeated teachings in his name.

== Teachings ==
Most of Rabbi Hama bar Ukva's teachings are in the field of Halakha, though in several places in the Talmud and Midrash his Aggadic teachings are cited.

In Tractate Sukkah he explains in the name of his Rabbi Jose bar Hanina the reason that the Lulav is shaken in all directions: "He moves them forward and backwards to stop harmful winds; upwards and downwards to halt harmful dew."

In Shir HaShirim Rabbah a statement of his is cited that deals with the importance of Torah learning. "Words of Torah strengthen one who learns them fully."
