= Bruna =

Bruna may refer to:

- Bruna (name), a given name and surname
- Bruna (butterfly), a genus of grass skipper butterflies
- 290 Bruna, an asteroid
- Bruna (company), a Dutch retailing chain
- Bruna (river), a watercourse in Tuscany, Italy
- Palacio Bruna, a palace in Santiago, Chile
