= French ship Brune =

Three ships of the French Navy have borne the name Brune, in honour of the Brune river, a river of Aisne.

== Ships ==
- Brune (1690), a 6-gun corvette of barque.
- Brune (1755), a 32-gun Blonde-class frigate.
- Brune (1781), a 20-gun Coquette-class corvette.
Ships of the French Navy named Brune
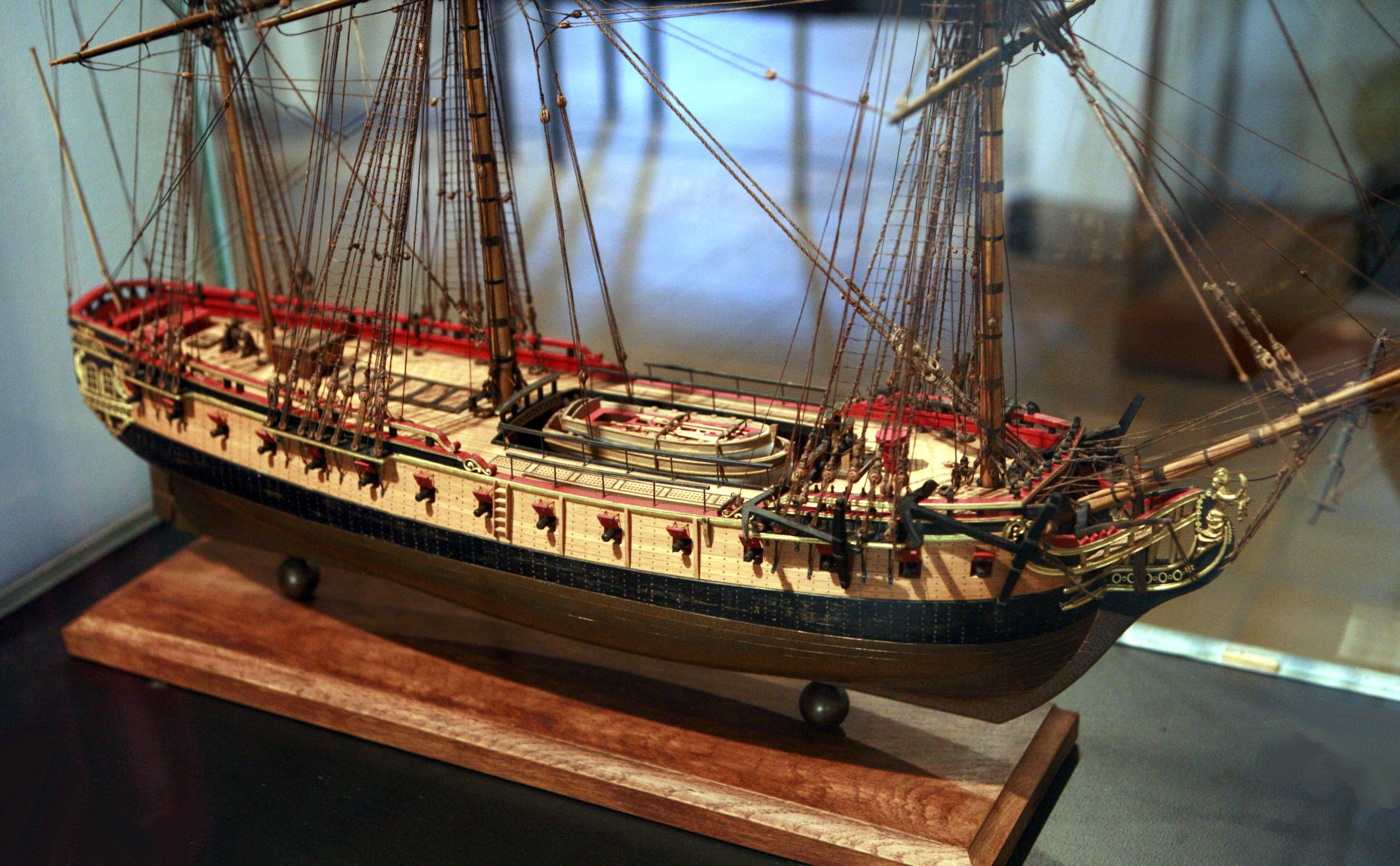
The frigate Vestale, sister-ship of Brune (1756)

== See also ==
- HMS Brune
