= Brunne =

Brunne is a surname. Notable people with the surname include:

- John Brunne (died c. 1405), British MP
- Eva Brunne (born 1954), Swedish Lutheran bishop
- Robert de Brunne (c. 1275 – c. 1338), English chronicler

== See also ==
- Brunn (surname)
- Brune
