= Brunetta =

Brunetta is an Italian surname. Notable people with the surname include:

- Eugenio Brunetta d'Usseaux (1857–1919), Italian nobleman
- Juan Brunetta (footballer) (born 1997), Argentine professional footballer
- Juan Guillermo Brunetta (born 1975), Argentine professional racing cyclist
- Mario Brunetta (born 1967), Canadian ice hockey player
- Renato Brunetta (born 1950), Italian economist and politician

== See also ==
- Bruni (surname)
