= Francesco Bruno =

Francesco Bruno may refer to:

- Francesco Bruno (artist) (c. 1660–?), Italian engraver
- Francesco Bruno (sport shooter) (born 1963), Italian sport shooter
- Francesco Bruno (1948 -2023) - Italian criminologist and physician

== See also ==
- Francesco Bruni
