= Isaac ben Eliashiv =

Amora sage of the 4th generation in Israel

R. Isaac ben Eliashiv (Hebrew: יצחק בן אלישיב) was a fourth-generation Amora sage of the Land of Israel.

== Biography ==
He is only mentioned a few times in the Talmud. It is possible that he belonged to a family of Bar Eliashiv, a rich and respected family.

He was known as a miracle-worker. It is told that his student Rabbi Mana II complained that the rich members of the family of his father-in-law were annoying him. R. Isaac exclaimed, "May they become poor!", and indeed they became miserably poor begging for alms. However, from that moment on, they started to upset him by pressing him to help them financially, something that ailed him as before, and when he reported this to his teacher, R. Isaac replied, "If so, let them become rich as before!", and so it was. Similarly, the same Mana complained that he has an ugly wife, and that he could no longer tolerate her. R. Isaac made a blessing that she will become beautiful. However, when the master's blessing materialized and his wife turned to be pretty, she began to dress up and domineering over him, and was no longer subservient to him. When R. Isaac heard this, he responded, "let Hannah revert to her former ugliness!", and so it was. When two other students of R. Isaac heard of these two stories, they asked him to pray that they may become very wise. R. Isaac replied, "That power that I have possessed, that all I ask is accepted before God, was taken from me, and my prayers are no longer accepted much."
