= Rav Berona =

3rd century Babylonian rabbi

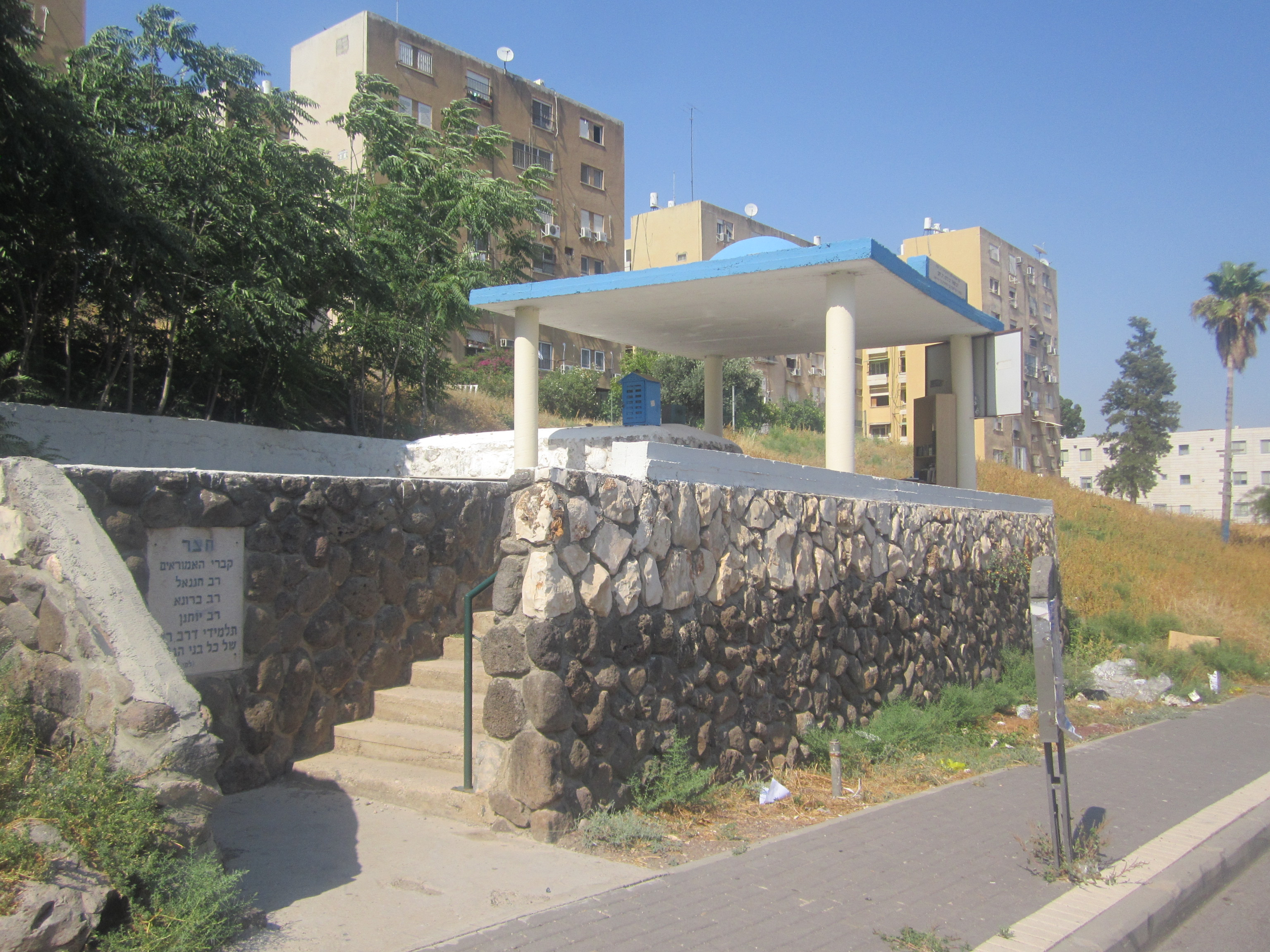
Amorai graves in Tiberias, Israel

R. Berona (or Rav Bruna, Beruna or Baruna; Hebrew: רב ברונא) was a Babylonian rabbi of the third century (second generation of amoraim).

== Biography ==
His principle teacher was Rav. He also submitted teachings in the name of Samuel of Nehardea.

It is told that R. Rabbi Ilai II was fond of him, and had asked Ulla when he arrives in Babylon to send his regards in the presence of all the members of the college, "for he is a great man and rejoices to perform a precept", since one day he managed to link Prayers of Redemption to the Amidah "and a smile did not leave his lips the whole day". He debated R. Judah ben Ezekiel.
