= Jean Malaurie =

French anthropologist and physicist (1922–2024)

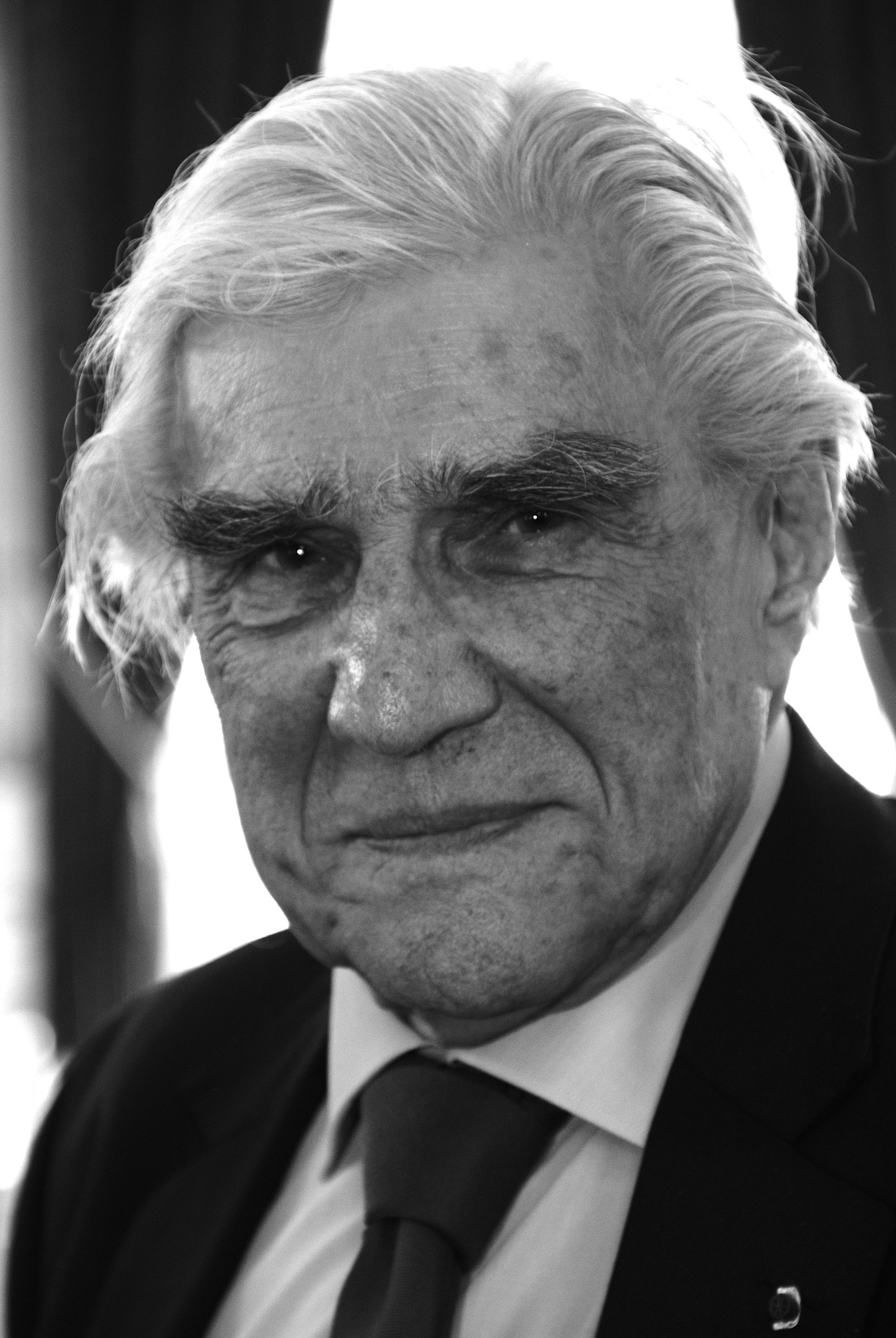
- Malaurie in 2013
- Born: 22 December 1922; Mainz, Hesse, Germany
- Died: 5 February 2024 (aged 101); Dieppe, France
- Scientific career
- Fields: Ethnohistorian, geographer, physicist, writer
- Workplaces: CNRS, EHESS

Jean Malaurie (22 December 1922 – 5 February 2024) was a French cultural anthropologist, explorer, geographer, physicist, and writer. He and Kutsikitsoq, an Inuk, were the first two men to reach the North Geomagnetic Pole on 29 May 1951.

Malaurie was a director of studies at the School for advanced studies in social sciences (EHESS) and director and founder of the Terre Humaine collection published by Plon in which features his Last Kings of Thule (1955), translated into twenty-three languages and remaining the most widely distributed work on the Inuit. A defender of the rights of Arctic minorities, threatened by the industrial development of the Far North, Jean Malaurie became a UNESCO Goodwill Ambassador for Arctic polar issues.

== Biography ==
Jean Malaurie was born in Mainz, occupied by French forces, into a French Catholic family of history scholars of Norman and Scottish descent. In 1943, while studying at the Lycée Henri-IV in Paris, he was drafted into the Service du travail obligatoire (STO - Compulsory Work Service for the Germans). Refusing to join, he went into hiding until August 1944.

Malaurie did his postgraduate studies in the Institut de Géographie de l'Université de Paris, under Professor Emmanuel de Martonne who, some 15 years earlier, had also taught to Julien Gracq. In 1948, Emmanuel de Martonne granted Malaurie the title of geographer/physicist of the French Polar Expeditions led by Paul Émile Victor along the West coast of Greenland and on its ice cap. He accomplished two missions in the Skansen Mountain, in the south of Disko Island, with the French Polar Expeditions (spring/autumn 1948 and 1949).

After two geomorphological and geocryological missions for the Centre National de la Recherche Scientifique – CNRS ("French National Centre for Scientific Research"), he spent two winters alone in the Hoggar desert in 1949 and 1950 (Algeria, Sahara). Then, in July 1950, he left on a mission to Thule, Greenland, where he led the "first French geographical and ethnological mission to the North of Greenland" for the CNRS. There, he established the first genealogy, covering four generations, of a group of 302 Inughuit, the northernmost people on earth. He also implemented a planning of trends in order to avoid the risks of consanguinity (banning marriage up to the 5th degree).

As a geomorphologist in the Great North of Greenland, he raised the map of the coast to 1:100 000 (topography, geomorphology of screes and nivation, sea ice). The map covers a 300 kilometre long and 3 kilometre wide region from Inglefield Land and the north of the Humboldt Glacier, to the south of Washington Land (Cape Jackson, 80° N). He discovered various fjords and unknown littorals, which he was authorized to name himself after French names, like the Paris Fjord, or after his Inuit travel companions such as the famous shaman, Uutaaq. He conducted a detailed geomorphological study of the screes and high latitude geocryological ecosystems, of which he described the cyclic and strata organization. He later made this the subject of his thesis: Thèmes de recherche géomorphologique dans le nord-ouest du Groenland (Geomorphological research in Northwest Greenland). On 9 April 1962 he was named Docteur d'État de géographie of the Institut de géographie de la Faculté des lettres de l'université de Paris.

Malaurie, together with Kutsikitsoq, were the first men ever to reach the geomagnetic North Pole (78°29′N 68°54′W) on 29 May 1951, with two dog sleds. On 16 June 1951 he discovered the American military base of Thule (Thule Air Base), built in secret to host nuclear bombers, and he decided to publicly stand up against the establishment of this base, for which the local population wasn't consulted.

His book Les Derniers rois de Thulé (The Last Kings of Thule) was published in 1955 as the founding book of the Terre Humaine series (Ed. Plon, Paris). It was soon followed by other classics such as Tristes Tropiques by Claude Lévi-Strauss, Les Immémoriaux by Victor Segalen, Affables Sauvages by Francis Huxley, Soleil Hopi by Don C. Talayesva, Pour l'Afrique, j'accuse by René Dumont and Carnets d'enquêtes by Émile Zola. The Terre Humaine series intends to move the focus away from our Western way of looking at things. In 1957, he was recommended by Fernand Braudel and Claude Lévi-Strauss, and elected to the Chair of Polar Geography, the first ever in the history of the French University, created for this occasion within the École des hautes études en sciences sociales – EHESS (School for Advanced Studies in Social Sciences). He then founded in 1958, the Centre d'études arctiques (Center for Arctic Studies) and launched in 1960 the great CNRS journal on the Arctic: Inter-Nord.

In 1968–1969, he led the French section of the Governmental Commission of France and Quebec during the creation of the autonomous territory of New Quebec, now called Nunavik. His recommendations, published in the book Du Nouveau-Québec au Nunavik, 1964-2004, une fragile autonomie (From New Quebec to Nunavik, 1964–2004, a Fragile Autonomy) and in the special section « Nunavik/Ungava » of the Inter-Nord publication n°20, aimed to establish the immediate autonomy of this territory and a deep pedagogical reform of the education system. They contributed to elaborating the status of the current Canadian Arctic Territories, mainly inspired by Charlie Watt, an Inuk Federal Senator.

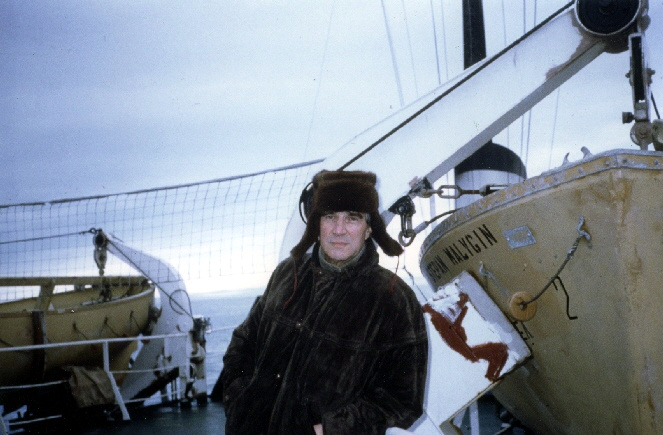
Jean Malaurie aboard the Soviet hydrographic ship Malygin, off the coast of Uelen, during his expedition to Chukotka in August 1990

Jean Malaurie led the first Franco-Soviet expedition in Siberian Chukotka in 1990, at the request of the Soviet government and of the Academician Dmitry Likhachov, Scientific Counsellor to Mikhail Gorbachev. He was also the first Westerner to discover the Whale Alley in 1990 in Northeast Siberia; a monument that had remained ignored until it was first identified by the Soviet archaeologist Sergueï Arutiunov in 1977. In 1992, Jean Malaurie founded the State Polar Academy in Saint-Petersburg, of which he was named Honorary President for life. In this school of Siberian executives, that hosts around a thousand boarder students, representing forty-five ethnic groups, in five faculties, French is taught as the first foreign language in a compulsory course.

In the course of his 31 missions, from Greenland to Siberia, he taught a method — called "anthropogeography, from stone to man" — reminding how the history, rituals and sociology of the Arctic peoples can only be understood in the frame of a given physical environment. These observations are linked to cybernetics with the Gaia principle, based on the conclusions of James Lovelock, shared by Jean Malaurie: the Earth would be "a dynamic physiological system that includes the biosphere and has kept our planet fit for life for over three billion years".

Jean Malaurie was an ardent defender of the rights of Arctic minorities, currently threatened by the development of industries and oil activities in the Great North. He has been an advisor to the four capital cities: Washington, Ottawa, Copenhagen and Moscow. In 2007, he was named UNESCO Goodwill Ambassador for Arctic polar issues (Fields of Sciences and Culture), and was invited to chair the first UNESCO International Experts Meeting on the Arctic: Climate change and Arctic sustainable development: scientific, social, cultural and educational challenges, which took place in Monaco from the 3rd to the 6th of March 2009. He is currently preparing, in collaboration with UNESCO, the upcoming International Congress on Circumpolar Peoples, to be held in 2011 in Greenland.

In 2007, he was appointed Honorary President of the Uummannaq Polar Institute, an institution that aims to preserve local Greenlandic culture and promote educational programmes for Inuit youth. In 2010, he founded the Pôle Inuit – Institut Jean Malaurie in Uummannaq (Greenland). As a writer, he is the author of, among other publications, The Last Kings of Thule ("Les derniers rois de Thulé", Paris, 1955; first published in English in 1982), translated into 23 languages and now the most widely distributed book about the Inuit. This book has been adapted into a movie and the cartoon version is in progress. Overall, Jean Malaurie published ten books and over five hundred scientific papers, which have just been assembled, together with previously unpublished ones, into a six volumes edition to be published by the CNRS Éditions.

A prominent figure in French polar research, following the tradition of Jean-Baptiste Charcot, captain of the research vessel Pourquoi-Pas?, he later resided in Dieppe. A museum dedicated to his work was established in Uummannaq on the northwest coast of Greenland, featuring a reconstruction of his former wintering base in a peat house.

Malaurie was made a commander of the Légion d'honneur of France and was awarded the Great Gold Medal of Saint-Petersburg, and received the Patron's Medal of the Royal Geographical Society of London from Queen Elizabeth II. He was also granted the Medal of the Bear, a high distinction of the Greenlandic government, as well as many other foreign distinctions such as the Mungo Park Medal, awarded to him in 2005 by the Royal Scottish Geographical Society.

Malaurie died on 5 February 2024, at the age of 101.

== Titles and honorary distinctions ==
=== Titles ===
- Founder and Director of the Terre Humaine series, Ed. Plon, Paris (since February 1954). This series of books initiated an important intellectual trend called « Pléiade d'une nouvelle ethnologie » ("Pleiad of a new ethnology"). Its one hundredth author will be published in the course of this year.
- Elected first chair of Polar Geography (French higher education), founded at EHESS (Paris, France) by the Professor Fernand Braudel (1957→). Seminars delivered from 1957 to 2004 (One hundred thesis and PhD defences).
- Founder of the Centre d'études arctiques (Center for Arctic Studies) (EHESS, CNRS), (1958 →)
- Founder and Director of the Fondation française d'études nordiques (French Foundation for Nordic Studies) in Rouen, France, created on May 11, 1964. (1964–1975)
- Directeur de recherche titulaire in the French CNRS (since 1979).
- Director of the CNRS base in Spitzberg from 1979 to 1990, with a programme of integrated geomorphology for ten PhD students.
- Creation of the Festival du Film arctique in 1983 (1983, Dieppe; 1986, Rovaniemi; 1989, Fermo; the fourth edition of the Festival is currently in preparation in Uummannaq, Greenland).
- Director and Founder of the Fonds polaire Jean Malaurie in the Central Library of the Muséum national d'histoire naturelle, Paris, France (1992 →).
- Director and Founder of the International Arctic Publication Inter-Nord, (CNRS - EHESS), 21 volumes (1960 →). The contributions of 300 authors were published in this bilingual magazine, building a genuine 6 500 pages encyclopaedia of the Arctic.
- The first man ever to have reached the geomagnetic North Pole by dog sled on May 29, 1951.
- 31 missions, most of them solo, from Greenland to Siberia (1948–1997).
- Teacher and Director of Studies at EHESS: defence and illustration of the anthropogeographic method for the study of peoples under extreme climates (1957–2004).
- Honorary President of the State Polar Academy of Saint Petersburg, which he co-founded in 1992. The State Polar Academy, a school of Siberian executives, was registered in the International Association of Francophone Universities in 2004, and signed a cooperation agreement with the Institut régional d'administration (IRA) of Lille, France (2005–2007).
- Honorary President of the Opening Symposium of the International Polar Year (IPY) on « Arctic issues: environment, societies and heritage », held from 8 to 10 March 2007 in the Muséum national d'histoire naturelle, Paris, France. The event was organized under the high patronage of the French President Jacques Chirac, who delivered the opening speech. This symposium brought together top researchers and political personalities from all over the World, including French, Inuit and North-Siberian specialists. It was the 14th of a series of International Symposiums held by the Centre d'études arctiques (Center for Arctic Studies) at the instigation of Pr Jean Malaurie. It gathered participants from various parts of the World, and notably from Russia. The 50th anniversary of the Centre d'études arctiques, celebrated during the IPY, was the object of a "National Commemoration" by the French Ministry of Culture. The first pan-Inuit conference ever to be organized was held in Rouen, France, from 24 to 27 November 1969, under the presidency of Nobel Prize winner René Cassin[9]. It addressed the issues of "Economical Development in the Arctic and the future of Eskimo Societies". Jean Malaurie also organized the first Arctic Oil and Gas Congress in Le Havre, France, on May 2–5, 1973.
- UNESCO Goodwill Ambassador for Arctic polar issues in the fields of Sciences and Culture (2007).
- Honorary President of the Uummannaq Polar Institute (Greenland).
- Honorary Patron of the NGO Libraries Without Borders.
- Founder and President of the Pôle Inuit – Institut Jean Malaurie, created under the aegis of the Centre d'études arctiques and in partnership with the Uummannaq Polar Institute (Greenland). Its aim is to welcome and sponsor two Greenlandic students every year, providing them with a Master lever training and involving them in CNRS research missions.

=== Scientific distinctions ===
- Prix de l'Académie des sciences, a prize from the French Academy of Sciences (1967).
- Médaille d'Or ("Gold Medal") of the Société arctique française (1990).
- Awarded a Medal from the CNRS ("French National Center for Scientific Research") in 1992.
- Grande Médaille de la Société de Géographie (Paris, 1997).
- Honorary Doctor of Saint Petersburg State University (2001).
- Received the Great Gold Konstantin Medal from the Russian Geographical Society (Saint-Petersburg, 2003).
- Patron's gold medal, signed by Queen Elizabeth II (Royal Geographical Society, London, 2005).
- Mungo Park Medal (The Royal Scottish Geographical Society, 2005).
- Honorary Professor of Ecole des Hautes Etudes Commerciales – HEC (Graduate Business School), (Paris, 2005).
- Honorary Doctor of the State University of New York at Buffalo, 2008.
- Nersornaat distinction, Gold Medal of the Greenlandic Parliament received on February 27, 2009, in Paris from the President of the Greenlandic Parliament, Mrs Ruth Heilman.

=== Awards and medals ===
- Commandeur de l'Ordre national du Mérite (France, 2002).
- Commandeur des Arts et des Lettres (France, 2000).
- Commandeur de la Légion d'honneur (France, 2005).
- Polar Bear Distinction, personally awarded by the Prime Minister of Greenland himself, Jonathan Motzfeldt, in Paris, France (1999).
- Prix de l'Académie française (France, 1968).
- Grand prix de la Ville de Paris (France, 1999).
- Grand Prix Jules-Verne (France, 2000).
- Commander of the Royal Order of the Dannebrog, on the request of the Queen of Denmark (2007), awarded in Paris by Prince Henrik of Denmark (2007).
- Greenland Medal for Meritorious Service Nersornaat

=== Other foreign distinctions ===
- Elected Sage des peuples du Nord by the Institute of Peoples of the North, Herzen State University, Leningrad (1992).
- Honorary Citizen of the city of Fermo (Italy), home to the Istituto geografico polare and the Italian Museo polare (1998).
- Medal of the Oriental Republic of Uruguay (March 12, 1997)
- Received the Congratulations of the Canadian Senate on his scientific work, according to Senator Charlie Watt (Ottawa, June 15, 2000).
- Médaille d'Or de Saint-Pétersbourg ("Gold Medal of Saint Petersburg") on the occasion of the city's tercentenary, awarded in Paris by the Russian Ambassador H.E. Mr Alexandre Alexeevitch Avdeev (2003).

== Works ==
- Hoggar, Touareg, Journal d'une exploration géographique (Paris, Ed. Nathan, 1954).
- Les derniers rois de Thulé: avec les Esquimaux polaires, face à leur destin (Paris, Ed. Plon, Terre humaine series, 1955 – 5th definitive edition, Paris, 1989; Ed. Pocket, 2001) – translated into 23 languages.
- The last kings of Thule: with the Polar Eskimos, as they face their destiny, English translation of Les derniers rois de Thulé, translated from the French by Adrienne Foulke (London: Jonathan Cape, 1982. 489p; New York: Chicago University Press, 1982. 489p.)
- Thèmes de recherche géomorphologique dans le nord-ouest du Groenland, 497 p., 79 photos, 161 fig., 1 coloured map (topography, botany and hydrology) to 1:25 000 (Skansen, Disko), 1 couloured map (topography, geomorphology and sea ice) to 1:200 000 – Thesis defended in 1962 - ('Mémoires et documents', Special issue, Paris, CNRS Editions, 1968; 2d Ed., Paris, 2011, in: Grand Nord Grand Large - CNRS Editions, including iconography).
- Hummocks I and II (Paris, Ed. Plon, Terre humaine series, 1999). Hummocks, extended edition, 4 volumes (Paris, Ed. Plon / Pocket, 2003, 2005).
- Hummocks, Journeys and inquiries among the Canadian Inuit, English translation of Hummocks, translated by Peter Feldstein. (Montreal, Quebec: McGill-Queen's University Press, 2007. New foreword by Jean Malaurie, postface by Bruce Jackson.)
- Ultima Thulé (2d edition, Paris, Ed. Le Chêne, 2000, Ed. Pocket, 2001) – translated into English, German and Danish.
- Ultima Thulé : explorers and natives of the polar North, translated from the French by Willard Wood and Anthony Roberts. (New York; London: W.W. Norton, 2000.)
- L'Appel du Nord (Paris, Ed. La Martinière, 2001) translated into English and German.
- Call of the North: an explorer's journey to the North Pole, English translation of L'Appel du Nord. (New York, Abrams, 2001)
- L'Allée des baleines (Paris, Ed. Fayard, Mille et une nuits series, 2003, New extended edition 2008) translated into Russian and English.
- The Whales Alley, English translation of L'Allée des baleines, in press. • Alleia Kitov, Russian translation of L'Allée des baleines, foreword by Serguei Arutiunov (Moscow, Ed. Nota Bene, 2007)
- Ot kamnia k tcheloveku ("From stone to man"), foreword by Azourguet Tarbaievna Shaoukenbaieva, in Russian. (Saint-Petersburg, State Polar Academy of Saint-Petersburg, 2003).
- Terre Humaine : cinquante ans d'une collection, entretien de Mauricette Berne et Pierrette Crouzet avec Jean Malaurie; foreword by French President Jacques Chirac, introduction by Jean-Noël Jeanneney, President of the Bibliothèque nationale de France (French National Library), presentations by Olivier Orban, Director of the Plon publishing house, Bruce Jackson, Jacques Lacarrière, (Paris, éditions de la Bibliothèque nationale de France, 2005), 135 p.
- Terre Mère (Paris, CNRS Editions, 2008).
- Uummaa : la prescience sauvage (Paris, Ed. Plon, Terre humaine series, to be released in 2011)
- Arctica, 1948-2010, une prescience de combat (5 volumes) to be released by CNRS Editions. Collection of 500 scientific papers (some of which unpublished); released in French, English, German and Russian. Volume 1 : En éclaireur; Volume 2 : Écosystème arctique; Volume 3 : Ethnologie et anthropologie arctiques; Volume 4 : Développement durable et périls de perte d'identité des peuples premiers circumpolaires; Volume 5 : Terre Humaine, entretiens et portraits.
- Several hundreds interviews (press, television, radio, Internet), in French, Russian, English, Italian, German, Danish and Greenlandic.

=== Sources ===
- Giulia Bogliolo Bruna, Jean Malaurie, une énergie créatrice, coll. « Lire et comprendre », Editions Armand Colin, Paris, October 2012.
- Giulia Bogliolo Bruna, Equilibri artici. L'Umanesimo ecologico di Jean Malaurie, CISU, September 2016.
- "Alla ricerca della quadratura del Circolo Polare. Testimonianze e studi in onore di Jean Malaurie", Il Polo (numero speciale), Giulia Bogliolo Bruna (dir.), vol. 25–26, Istituto Geografico Polare, Fermo, 1999.
- Jean Malaurie, un homme singulier, Jan Borm, Éditions du Chêne, 2005.
- Dictionnaire amoureux des Explorateurs, Michel Le Bris, Ed. Plon, Paris, 2010.
- Terre Humaine : des récits et des hommes, Pierre Aurégan, Pocket, Agora series, Paris, 2004.

== Resources ==
=== Bibliography ===
- Jean Malaurie, une énergie créatrice by Giulia Bogliolo Bruna, coll. « Lire et comprendre », Editions Armand Colin, Paris, octobre 2012.
- Pour Jean Malaurie - 102 témoignages en hommage à quarante ans d'études arctiques ("To Jean Malaurie – 102 testimonials as a tribute to forty years of Arctic Studies"). Coordinator: Sylvie Devers - Ed. Plon, Paris, 1990.
- Il Polo, 'Alla ricerca della quadratura del Circolo Polare : Testimonianze e studi in onore di Jean Malaurie', interview of Jean Malaurie by Giulia Bogliolo Bruna, 26 international testimonials under the direction of Giulia Bogliolo Bruna (Istituto Geografico Polare, vol. 25–26, March–June 1999, Fermo)
- Des récits et des hommes : Terre humaine : un autre regard sur les sciences de l'homme, Pierre Auregan (Nathan Université / Plon, Paris, 2001; éd. Pocket, 2004).
- De la vérité en ethnologie... - Lecture by Jean Malaurie 2000-2001 (coordination : Dominique Sewane – Ed. Economica, "Polaires" series, Paris, 2002).
- Hommages, published on the occasion of the Exhibit held in the French National Library for the fiftieth anniversary of the Terre humaine series, from February 15 to April 30, 2005. 28 testimonials, foreword by Jean-Noël Jeanneney, coordination : Pierrette Crouzet (Paris, éditions de la Bibliothèque nationale de France, 2005).
- Jean Malaurie: un homme singulier, Jan Borm (Paris, Ed. Le Chêne, 2005).
- Comprendre Jean Malaurie, Giulia Bogliolo Bruna (« Lire et comprendre », Paris, Armand Colin, to be released in 2011)

=== Filmography ===
- The Last Kings of Thule ("Les Derniers Rois de Thulé") Northern Greenland. Direction and commentaries. Film, 16 mm, colour, 120 min. ORTF (Télévision Paris), 1970 :
  - 1st part: L'Esquimau polaire, le chasseur. ("The Polar Eskimo, a Hunter")
  - 2d part: L'Esquimau chômeur et imprévisible. ("The unemployed and unpredictable Eskimo")
  - Reedited into a 52 min film, and restored with the original colours, under the direction of Jean Malaurie. Production: Films du Village/Zarafa and France 5, INA, Paris, in 2002. Greenlandic and American Production.
- Inuit (Groenland, Canada, Alaska, Sibérie). Seven 16 mm coloured films, shot in 1974/1976. Antenne 2 (TV Paris), 1980. Direction and commentaries, INA, Paris.
  - Le Cri universel du peuple esquimau ("The Universal Cry of the Eskimo People"). 87 min
  - Les Groenlandais et le Danemark. Nunarput (Notre Terre) ("Greenlanders and Denmark, Nunarput – 'Our Land' "). 55 min
  - Les Groenlandais et le Danemark : le Groenland se lève. ("Greenlanders and Denmark: Greenland is rising") 55 min
- Les Esquimaux et le Canada : l'incommunicabilité. ("The Eskimo and Canada: communication breakdown") 55 min
  - Les Esquimaux alaskiens et les États-Unis d'Amérique : les fils de la baleine. ("The Eskimo of Alaska and the United States of America: the Sons of the Whale") 55 min
  - Les Esquimaux alaskiens et les États-Unis d'Amérique : pétrodollars et pouvoir. ("The Eskimo of Alaska and the United States of America: petrodollar and power") 55 min
  - Les Esquimaux d'Asie et l'Union soviétique : aux sources de l'histoire inuit. ("The Eskimo of Asia and the Soviet Union: back to the roots of Inuit history") 55 min
- Haïnak-Inuit, le cri universel du peuple esquimau. ("Haïnak-Inuit, the Universal Cry of the Eskimo People") New version based on the 1980 programme. 52 min. Direction, commentaries and new images updating the seven films of the Inuit series. INA, 1993 (France 5 : broadcast in December 1995).
- La Saga des Inuit. Four 52 min films, made from Jean Malaurie's 10 films and followed by a long close-up interview. Production INA, distribution France 5, 2007. Rerun in 2008. DVD Box set, INA, Paris, 2007.
  - Un peuple légendaire ("A legendary people")
  - Vers le meilleur des mondes ? (Groenland, Canada) ("Towards the Best of Worlds (Greenland and Canada)")
  - Le futur a déjà commencé (Alaska, Tchoukotka sibérienne) ("The Future has already begun, (Alaska, Siberian Chukotka)")
  - Le Souffle du Grand Nord (entretien/portrait) ("The Blow of the Great North (close-up interview)")

=== Films about Jean Malaurie ===
- Jean Malaurie : Une passion arctique, Directed by Michel Viotte, La compagnie des Indes, Arte, Paris, 2010, 43 min.
- Numerous interviews on Antenne 2, France 3, as well as foreign television channels (Moscow, Montreal, Nuuk...).

=== Sound archives ===
- Chez les Esquimaux Netsiligmiout et Outkoukiksarlormiout ("Together with the Eskimo Netsiligmiout and Outkoukiksarlormiout") – 28 min 46 s (Chant du Monde, 1962–63)
- Chants et tambours inuit, de Thulé au Détroit de Béring ("Inuit Chants and Drums, from Thule to the Bering Strait") – 70 min 43 s (Ocora C 559021, Paris, 1988)
- Jean Malaurie - De la pierre à l'homme ("From Stone to Man"), Les Grandes Heures series, 2 discs of 72 minutes each, built from interviews given by Jean Malaurie for Radio France and preserved by the French Institut National de l'Audiovisuel - INA (Editor-in-charge: Béatrice Montoriol – Production: Thérèse Salviat – INA/Radio France, Paris, 2004)
