= Bruno (surname) =

Bruno is a surname.

- Alessio Bruno (born 1994) Italian footballer
- Andrea Bruno (1931–2025), Italian architect
- Angelo Bruno (1911–1980), former boss of the Philadelphia crime family
- Chris Bruno (born 1966), actor
- Doug Bruno (born 1950), former college basketball player and women's basketball coach
- Dylan Bruno (born 1972), American actor
- Edoardo Bruno (1928–2020), Italian film critic
- Federico Bruno (born 1993), Argentine distance runner
- Francesco Bruno (born 1968), Italian sport shooter
- Francesco Faà di Bruno (1825–1888), Italian mathematician and priest
- Frank Bruno (born 1961), boxer
- Gaetano Bruno (born 1973), Italian actor
- Gioia Bruno (born 1963), American musician
- Giordano Bruno (1548–1600), Italian philosopher, priest, cosmologist and occultist, executed for heresy
- Giovanni Bruno (born 1988), Italian footballer
- Giuliana Bruno, academic and art writer
- Hal Bruno (1928–2011), American journalist
- Jahzir Bruno (born 2009), American actor
- J. Jon Bruno (1946–2021), Episcopal Bishop of Los Angeles
- Joseph Bruno (1929–2020), New York politician
- Julio Bruno is a Spanish businessman and former Executive Chairman and CEO of Time Out Group.
- Kelly Bruno (born 1984), American runner
- Michele Bruno (1941–2016), South African drag queen
- Nick Bruno, American film director and animator
- Nick Bruno (born 1951), eighth president of the University of Louisiana at Monroe
- Oscar Bruno, Argentine-American numerical analyst
- Quentin Bruno, singer, dancer and actor
- Robert R. Bruno Jr. (1945–2008), American artist, inventor and businessman
- Salvatore Bruno (born 1979), Italian football striker
- Sébastien Bruno (born 1974), French rugby union player
- Tony Bruno (born 1952), American sports talk radio host
- Tory Bruno (born 1961), aerospace executive and president and CEO of United Launch Alliance

== Fictional characters ==
- Avilio Bruno, in the anime 91 Days
- Billi Bruno (born 1997), actress
- Giorgio Bruno, in the video game Time Crisis 4
- Bruno Airmont, in Shadow Ticket by Thomas Pynchon

== See also ==
- Brun
- Bruno (name)
- Bruno (disambiguation)
- Brune (surname)
- Bruni (surname)
