= Peyre-Brune =

Dolmen in Saint-Aquilin, France

Coordinates: 45°11′43″N 0°27′26″E

Peyre-Brune is a Neolithic dolmen situated near Saint-Aquilin in the department of the Dordogne, France.

== Geographical position ==
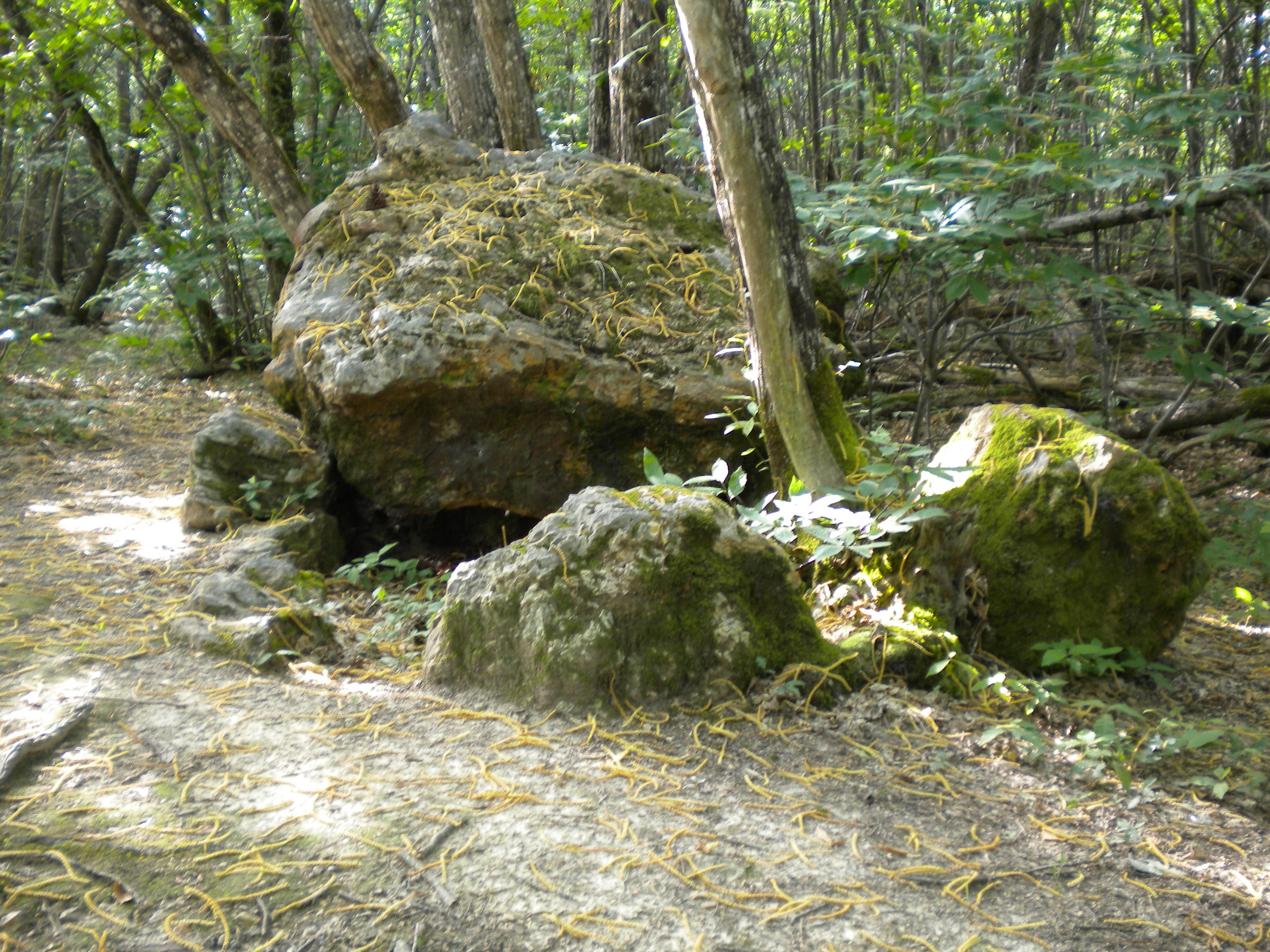
The dolmen Peyre-Brune near Saint-Aquilin

The dolmen Peyre-Brune is situated next to a forest track leading from Seyssac, a little hamlet in the commune of Saint-Aquilin, to Segonzac. The dolmen appears about a mile after Seyssac on the right hand side of the track. Its name is derived from the Occitan word peyre meaning stone and the French adjective brune for brown. It is also known as Pierre-Brune or dolmen of Belet. The dolmen is completely surrounded by woods and is positioned on a topographic high at about 200 meters above sea level.

== Orientation, structure and geology ==
The rectangular, one-chambered dolmen is about 2.75 meters long and 2 meters wide, its long axis is oriented towards the south-east. The dolmen was built on sands from the Upper Eocene belonging to the Formation de Boisbreteau. It consists of seven uprights 80 centimetres tall and 65 centimetres wide. Unfortunately the massive covering roof block meanwhile has tilted to the south-east. The stones consist all of the same material - a very hard, silicified and iron-bearing, very fine-grained sandstone of orange-brown colour, which explains the dolmen's name. These recrystallized rocks belong to the Formation de Beau-Repos (sidérolithique), a Middle Eocene formation of the Aquitaine Basin. This formation occurs now only very erratically on the underlying Campanian. At the end of the Campanian the sea withdrew and the chalky sediments started to become karstified. Continental sediments of the Lower Eocene (Cuisian) and Middle Eocene started to fill in depressions in the karst surface. These pockets were later diagenetically altered and recrystallized. This very hard stone was much appreciated by the megalithic builders, and Peyre-brune is not the only structure, where the sidérolithique was used (another example is the dolmen Peyrolevado near Paussac).

The stones must have been transported a fair distance judging by the nearest Middle Eocene outcrops being more than a quarter-mile away.

== Finds ==
The dolmen was a burial tomb of a local chieftain. Excavations by the Societé archéologique du Périgord in 1874 unearthed the following objects:

- earrings
- pottery fragments
- broken vases
- one biface
- axes
- knives
- burins
- arrowheads

Furthermore, were found stone fragments, plant ash and charcoal derived from oaks.

Due to the pottery and stone fragments the dolmen can be attributed to the Artenac Culture.

Analyses showed that the defunct was not incinerated.

All these objects can be seen in the Musée du Périgord in Périgueux.

== Folklore ==
According to local folklore the chieftain was married to a fairy and was killed in a fight. The fairy ordered her servants to erect a dolmen at the site of her husband's death. She also cast a spell for all those who ever should dare to touch the grave.

== Conservation ==
Today the dolmen is in a very bad state of conservation. The dolmen also gets more and more overgrown by sweet chestnut.

== Importance ==
Peyre-Brune is one of the very few megalithic monuments in this region, that can be attributed to a local culture.

== Sources ==
- Description of Les amis de Saint Aquilin – Conseil Général de la Dordogne
- Platel, J.-P.; et al. (1989), "Périgueux (Ouest)", Carte géologique de la France à 1/50 000, BRGM
