= Francesco Bruni =

Francesco Bruni may refer to:

- Francesco Bruni (bishop) (1802–1863), bishop in Roman Catholic Diocese of Ugento-Santa Maria di Leuca
- Francesco Bruni (linguist) (1943–2025), Italian linguist, see Veronese Riddle
- Francesco Bruni (politician) (1929–2024), Italian politician
- Francesco Bruni (sailor) (born 1973), Italian Olympic sailor
- Francesco Bruni (screenwriter) (born 1961), Italian screenwriter and director

== See also ==
- Francesco Bruno
