= Saint-Aquilin =

- Commune
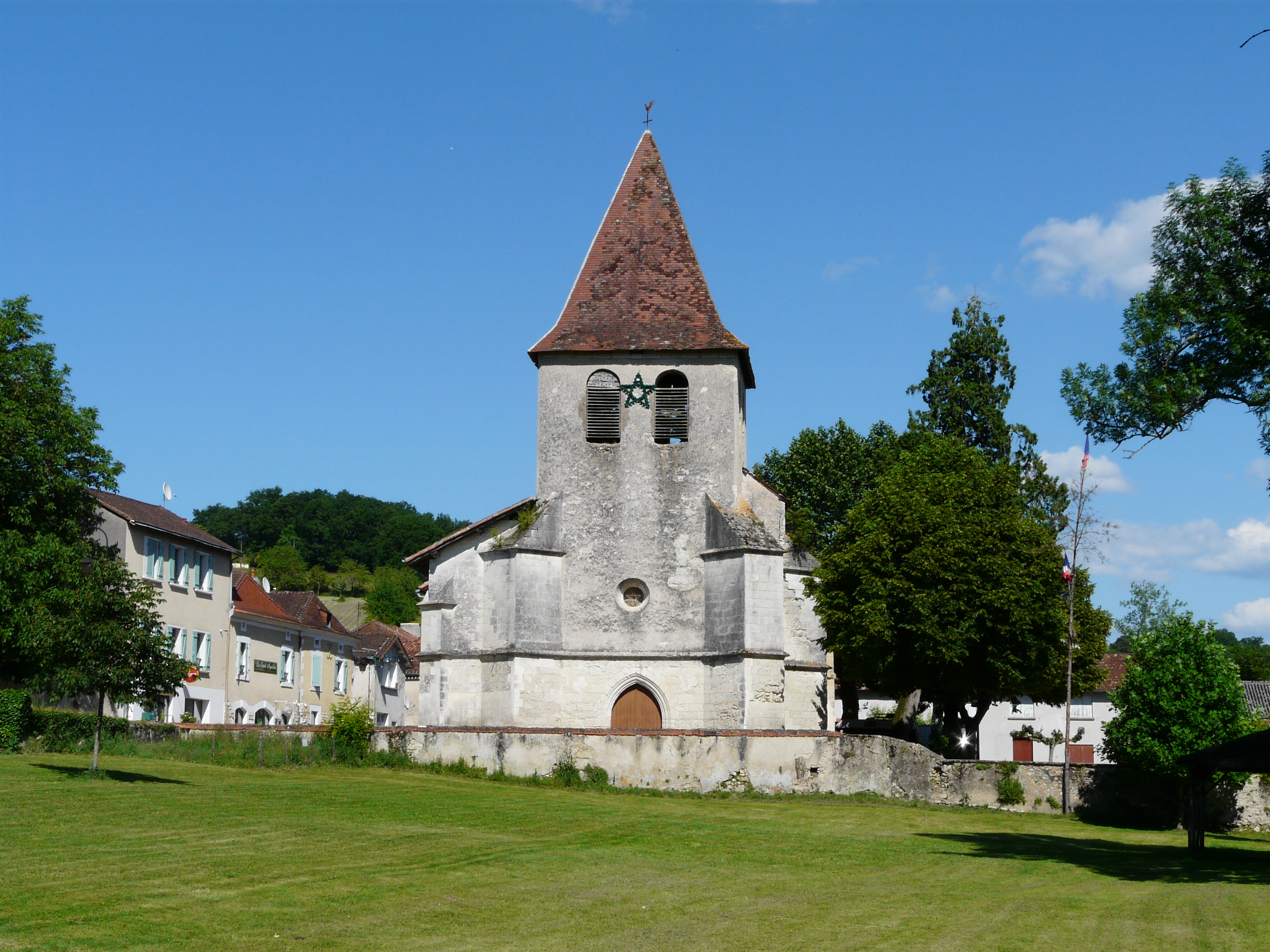
- The church in Saint-Aquilin

- Coat of arms
- Location of Saint-Aquilin
- Location within France Location within Nouvelle-Aquitaine
- Coordinates: 45°11′13″N 0°29′40″E
- Country: France
- Region: Nouvelle-Aquitaine
- Department: Dordogne
- Arrondissement: Périgueux
- Canton: Vallée de l'Isle

Government
  - Mayor (2020–2026): Annie Dutilh-Lespinasse
- Area^{1}: 22.35 km^{2} (8.63 sq mi)
- Elevation: 140 m (460 ft)
- Highest elevation: 232 m (761 ft)
- Lowest elevation: 97 m (318 ft)
- Population (2023): 458
  - Density: 20.5/km^{2} (53.1/sq mi)
- Time zone: UTC+01:00 (CET)
  - Summer (DST): UTC+02:00 (CEST)
- INSEE/Postal code: 24371 /24110
- ^{1} French Land Register data, which excludes lakes, ponds, glaciers > 1 km^{2} (0.386 sq mi or 247 acres) and river estuaries.

Saint-Aquilin (French pronunciation: [sɛ̃.t‿akilɛ̃]; Limousin: Sent Agulin) is a commune in the Dordogne department in Nouvelle-Aquitaine in southwestern France.

== Population ==
Historical population
Year	Pop.	±% p.a.
1968	440	—
1975	381	−2.04%
1982	388	+0.26%
1990	387	−0.03%
1999	450	+1.69%
2007	490	+1.07%
2012	499	+0.36%
2017	479	−0.81%
2023	458	−0.74%
Source: INSEE

== See also ==
- Communes of the Dordogne department
