= Teofilo Bruni =

Italian mathematician and astronomer (1569-1638)

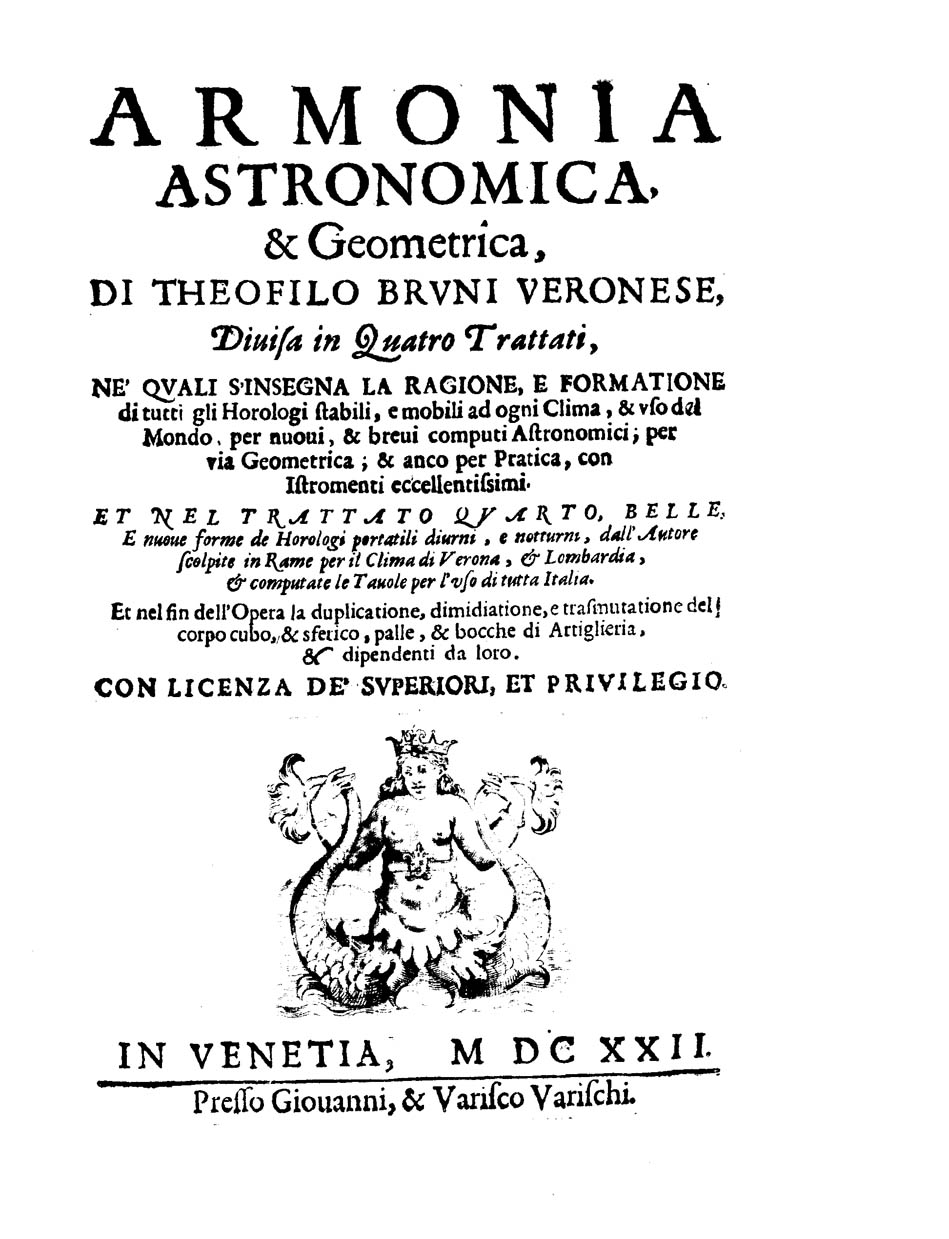
Armonia astronomica e geometrica, 1622

Teofilo Bruni (Verona, 1569 - Vicenza, 1638 ) was an Italian mathematician and astronomer.

== Life ==
Born in Verona, he was a capuchin friar known by the name of Raffaele. He wrote mainly about mathematics and astronomy, but he also published a book about clocks and other tools based on mathematical concepts.

== Works ==
- Armonia astronomica e geometrica (in Italian). Venezia: Giovanni Varisco & Varisco Varisco. 1622.
- Novo planisferio, o Astrolabio universale (in Italian). Vicenza: Francesco Grossi. 1625.
