= Julio Bruno =

Spanish businessman

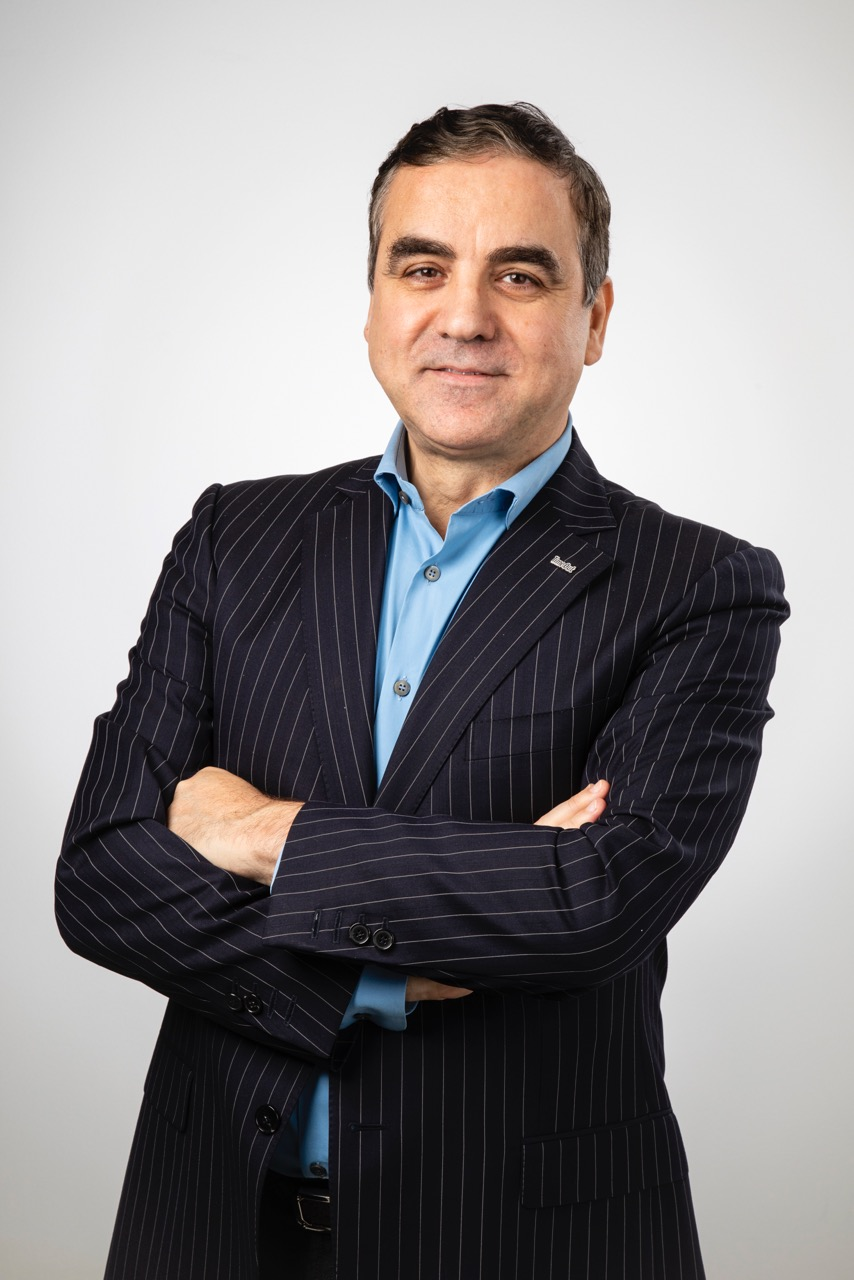
- Born: Gijon, Spain
- Occupation: Businessman
- Title: Executive Chairman Lío Group, CEO BeBeMe
- Awards: Officer’s Cross of the Royal Order of Isabella the Catholic, Order of Civil Merit of Spain – Officer’s Cross

Julio Bruno is a Spanish businessman and former Executive Chairman and CEO of Time Out Group. He is currently Executive Chairman of Lio Group and CEO of BeBeMe.

He is the holder of both the Royal Order of Isabella the Catholic – Officer's Cross and the Order of Civil Merit of Spain – Officer's Cross.

== Career ==
After leaving home at the age of 17, Bruno would go on to hold a number of senior positions at companies including Diageo PLC, Regus PLC and Travelport.

In 2011, was Bruno was appointed Global Vice-president of Sales for Tripadvisor.

Bruno joined Time Out Group in 2015 as Executive Chairman and was appointed CEO the following year. During his time at the company, he oversaw it going public on London’s Alternative Investment Market. He also managed its digital transformation and expansion of Time Out Market Food Halls. He would go on to steer it through COVID-19 when national shutdowns resulted in its print editions being scrapped due to lack of listings and demand. He stepped down from his role in 2021 to pursue other business interests.

Bruno was appointed Non-Executive Chairman of the sustainable food and drink market Mercato Metropolitano in 2022. In 2023 Bruno founded BeBeMe; a London based wine, import and distribution company with bars and venues across the city.

In 2024, Bruno was appointed Executive Chairman of Lio Group, an international restaurant group which specializes in cabaret shows.

== Other interests ==
Bruno’s podcast, The Internationalist, was launched in 2022 with a focus on what it means to be a global citizen in the modern age. Guests included Anthony Scaramucci, Peter Tatchell and Gina Miller. He also hosted the Time Out podcast Your City or Mine.

Bruno would publish his first book “Passion to Lead” in September 2022. The book encouraged readers to strive for their dream careers by casting aside doubts and focusing on their own path in life.

He has written columns for publications including La Nueva Espana and Cinco Dias.

== Personal life ==
Born in Gijón, Spain, Bruno has four sisters and one brother. Bruno's father was a published author who wrote on flowers and botany.

Currently living in London, Bruno is Spanish, but also holds American citizenship.

He graduated with a BSc in Business Management and Economics from the State University of New York, before completing post graduate studies at University of London, Birkbeck College where he gained a master's degree in International Business. He holds post-graduate certificate on leadership from Wharton, University of Pennsylvania.

== Awards and recognition ==
- 2019 - 'Order of Civil Merit of Spain – Officer's Cross', for outstanding service by Spanish and foreign citizens for the benefit of Spain.
- 2021 - Heroes Advocate Executive list celebrating the top 35 global leaders championing and advocating for women in the workplace.
- 2021 - British Media Awards, Business Leader of the Year.
- 2021 - Top 50 EMpower Advocate Executive global leaders championing and advocating for ethnic minorities.
- 2021 - Top 100 OUTstanding LGBT+ Role Model global list 2021.
- 2025 - 'Officer's Cross of the Royal Order of Isabella the Catholic', for extraordinary services to Spain and the promotion of international relations and cooperation with other nations.
- 2025 - Forbes Business Pride Leaders 2025.
