= Rabbi Mana II =

Amora of the Land of Israel

Rabbi Mana II (Recorded in the Talmud as R. Mani) was an Amora of the Land of Israel, of the fifth generation of the Amora era. He was the son of Rabbi Jonah, and headed the Yeshiva of Sepphoris. He is cited mostly in the Jerusalem Talmud.

The Jerusalem Talmud (Sanhedrin 3:5) records that R. Mana instructed the bakers of Sepphoris to bake bread (either on the Sabbath or Passover) when a certain Proqla arrived. This individual should be identified with Proculus (prefect of Constantinople), who was governor of Palestine in c. 380. This would indicate that the Jerusalem Talmud was completed after this time.
