= Jeremiah (III) =

Jewish Amora sage of the Land of Israel

Rabbi Yirmeyah (or R. Jeremiah (iii) or Jeremiah ben Abba; Hebrew: רבי ירמיה) was a prominent Jewish Amora sage of the Land of Israel, of the fourth generation of the Amora era (4th century).

He is always quoted by the single name "Jeremiah," though sometimes that name is used for Jeremiah b. Abba.

== Biography ==
He was born in Babylonia, and initially was unsuccessful in his studies. He then emigrated to Caesarea, after which he made rapid progress in his studies. Among his teachers in the Land of Israel were Abbahu; Samuel bar Isaac, whose homilies he very frequently reports; and Rabbi Assi; but his principal teacher was his countryman Rav Zeira. Both Zeira and Abbahu loved the young scholar as a son. Ammi employed Jeremiah as tutor to his son. Once while Zeira and his pupil were engaged in some halakhic investigation the hour of prayer arrived, and Jeremiah began to betray impatience at being detained. Zeira, noticing it, reproved him with the words, "He that turns away his ear from hearing the law, even his prayer shall be abomination".

Jeremiah developed such industrious habits as to evoke from his teacher the remark that since the death of Ben Azzai and Ben Zoma, with whom the industry ended, there had not been so zealous a student as Jeremiah. But in his anxiety to acquire knowledge and accuracy he developed extreme captiousness. He frequently provoked the laughter of the academy, except of his teacher; and ultimately his ultra-subtleties became insufferable. His considerate preceptor time and again warned him against pursuing his arguments beyond the bounds of halakhah; but it proved of no avail. At last his colleagues gave vent to their displeasure. The college was seriously discussing a point of law, when Jeremiah broke in with what appeared to be a ridiculous objection, whereupon he was ordered out of the academy. It happened that after the death of the great teachers a legal problem vexed the minds of the scholars, and there was none to solve it. It was submitted to Jeremiah, who returned it with the solution, which he prefaced with the humble words: "Although I am not worthy [to be consulted by you], your pupil's opinion inclines this way." On receipt of this, which was taken as an apology for the past, his colleagues reinstated him.

Thenceforth Jeremiah was the undisputed head of the scholastic circle at Tiberias, and questions were addressed to him from different parts of Israel. Nor was his fame limited by the boundaries of his adopted country. In Babylonia also his opinions carried great weight, and when a contemporary or later Babylonian scholar introduced a statement by the phrase "It is said in the West," it was generally assumed that that statement emanated from Jeremiah. The reverence in which he was held by his former countrymen appears from the following colloquy between his younger contemporaries Abaye and Raba: Said the former: "One Palestinian scholar is worth two of ours"; whereupon the other remarked: "And yet when one of ours emigrates to Palestine he is worth two of the natives. Take, for example, Jeremiah; although while he was here he could not comprehend our teachers, since emigrating to Palestine he has risen to such eminence as to look upon us as 'stupid Babylonians'." Indeed, not only did Jeremiah repeatedly apply this epithet to Babylonian scholars, but he spoke disdainfully of his nativeland as well. Whenever an opinion by a Babylonian scholar met with his disapprobation, he would say: "Those Babylonian simpletons! they dwell in a land of darkness and advance opinions of darkness".

Along with the leadership of the scholastic circle, the management of public affairs was entrusted to him. He considered this occupation as paramount to engaging in the study of the Law; but it sometimes caused him unpleasantness. Once, some serious trouble threatened the Jews of Tiberias, and much treasure was required to avert it. Jeremiah was called upon to assess the people, and in discharging this duty he displeased his older colleague Jacob b. Bun. Jeremiah had called on Jacob for a considerable contribution, whereupon he remarked, "Jeremiah is still at his tricks: he deserves excommunication." The feeling between them became so bitter that they excommunicated each other, though they soon revoked their decrees and became reconciled.

Jeremiah had many pupils, among them Rabbi Jonah and Hezekiah II, who became leading scholars of the next generation.

He left the following directions for his interment: "Clothe me in white garments with sleeves, put stockings and shoes on my feet, place a staff in my hand, and lay me down on my side. Thus equipped, when the Messiah comes I shall be ready to follow him."

== Teachings ==
His name is frequently found in both halakhah and aggadah, in the Babylonian and Jerusalem Talmuds, and in the Midrashim.
