= Rabbi Jonah =

4th-century amora and rabbi

- Occupation(s): Talmudist, Rector of the academy at Tiberias
- Years active: 4th century
- Known for: Leading rabbinical authority in the 4th amoraic generation, paternal care for pupils, miraculous efficacy of prayers
- Notable work: Rector of the academy at Tiberias

Rabbi Jonah (Hebrew: רבי יונה) was an amora of the 4th century, the leading rabbinical authority in the 4th amoraic generation.

== Biography ==
With Jose bar Zevida, his early schoolmate and lifelong colleague and business partner, he studied under Ze'era I and Rav Ela. When, as young men, they called on Abbahu to express their sympathy with him in his bereavement, he treated them as prominent scholars. But Jonah's special master was Rav Jeremiah. From these masters and others, the youths acquired a thorough familiarity with the traditions, and gradually rose from pupils to fellows. Thus, it is said, "Haggai opened the discourse, and Jonah and Jose closed it".

Finally they succeeded to the rectorate of the academy at Tiberias. In his office Jonah was distinguished by his paternal care for his pupils, to whom he gave both advice and material support. According to the halakhic requirement he gave away the tithe of his income, but to those who studied halachah, not to priests or Levites, deriving his authority from II Chronicles 31:4.

When he discovered a worthy man who was poor, he would aid him in such a way as not to hurt his self-respect. "I understand," he would say to him, "that you have fallen heir to an estate" or "that your debtors will soon pay you; borrow some money of me, which you may repay when you come into possession of your fortune." As soon as the loan had been accepted, he would relieve the borrower from his promise by telling him, "This money is yours as a gift." This procedure he regarded as suggested by Psalms: "Blessed is he that considers [Hebr. משכיל = "is thoughtful towards"] the poor".

Jonah also enjoyed a certain respect among the Romans. He was included among those styled ("the mighty ones of the land of Israel"), because, the Rabbis explained, of the efficacy of his prayers in times of drought. The following miracle is related of him: Once, on Shabbat, fire broke out on his premises. A Nabatean whose property adjoined Jonah's attempted to extinguish it, but Jonah would not permit him thus to profane the Sabbath. "Do you rely on your good luck?" mockingly asked the Nabatean, to which Jonah replied, "Yes"; whereupon the fire was quenched.

As rectors of the academy at Tiberias, Jonah and Jose had many disciples, some of whom became leaders in the next generation, and spread and perpetuated their master's doctrines. Jonah left a worthy son and successor in the person of Mani II.
