= Nick Brune =

Canadian educator, historian, and author

Nick Brune (born 29 March 1952), is a Canadian educator, historian, and author.

== Life ==
Born in London, England, he received bachelor's degree and a master's degree in honours history and political science from the University of Toronto.

Brune began his teaching career in Lausanne, Switzerland but has taught most of his career in Halton County. He currently teaches history and civics at Iroquois Ridge High School, Oakville, Ontario, Canada.

Brune is currently the president of the non-profit educational foundation, the Civics Channel, dedicated to research, teaching and learning in the areas of citizenship and society, politics, human rights, and the justice system.

== Publications ==
Brune has co-authored more than half a dozen history and civics textbooks, beginning with Canada: A North American Nation (McGraw-Hill Ryerson, 1989) and most recently Defining Canada: History, Identity, and Culture (McGraw-Hill Ryerson, 2003). He is co-author and producer of the Civics Canada Online Textbook, as well as its print version, Civics Canada (ISBN 9780973802504).

In addition, he has produced learning resources for a variety of different organizations. He helped found and was the Educational Writer for the award-winning CBC-TV News in Review for its first six years of existence. He has written a number of resources for The Dominion Institute (Our Heroes, The Memory Project, Passages to Canada, and The Democracy Project. For the Hong Kong Commemorative Veterans Association, he wrote Canada in Hong Kong, 1941–1945, The Forgotten Heroes. Working with ALPHA, he co-authored a learning resource that examines human rights abuses in China, 1931–1945.

Brune has given presentations in Canada (Victoria, Winnipeg, Toronto, Montreal, and Halifax) and beyond (Birmingham, UK, Seoul, South Korea, and Shanghai, China). His themes have included historical as well as pedagogical topics.

== Awards ==
Nick Brune received the Marshall McLuhan Distinguished Teacher Award (1992). He also received the Governor General's Award for Excellence in Teaching Canadian History (2002). He is also co-author and producer of History of Canada Online (HCO), as well as its textbook version, Canada: Our Story, Our People. ISBN 978-0-9780389-0-8.
