= Bruna bruna =

Scientific classification
- Kingdom: Animalia
- Phylum: Arthropoda
- Class: Insecta
- Order: Lepidoptera
- Family: Hesperiidae
- Genus: Bruna; Evans, [1955]
- Species: B. bruna

Binomial name
- Bruna bruna Evans, [1955]

Genus of butterflies

Bruna bruna is a species of skipper butterfly in the family Hesperiidae. It is the only species in the monotypic genus Bruna.
