= 290 Bruna =

Main-belt asteroid

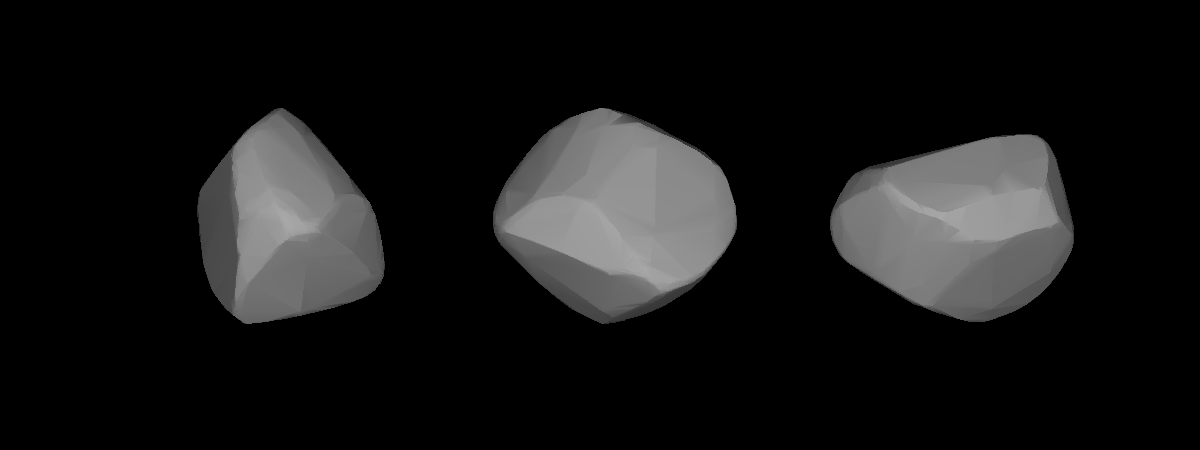
- A three-dimensional model of 290 Bruna based on its lightcurve

Discovery
- Discovered by: Johann Palisa
- Discovery date: 20 March 1890

Designations
- Pronunciation: /ˈbruːnə/
- Named after: Brno
- Alternative designations: A890 FA
- Minor planet category: main belt

Orbital characteristics
- Epoch 31 July 2016 (JD 2457600.5)
- Uncertainty parameter 0
- Observation arc: 100.87 yr (36843 d)
- Aphelion: 2.93884 AU (439.644 Gm)
- Perihelion: 1.73612 AU (259.720 Gm)
- Semi-major axis: 2.33748 AU (349.682 Gm)
- Eccentricity: 0.25727
- Orbital period (sidereal): 3.57 yr (1305.3 d)
- Mean anomaly: 171.767°
- Mean motion: 0° 16^{m} 32.851^{s} / day
- Inclination: 22.3321°
- Longitude of ascending node: 10.4972°
- Argument of perihelion: 105.068°

Physical characteristics
- Dimensions: 9.822 km
- Synodic rotation period: 13.807 h (0.5753 d)
- Geometric albedo: 0.314
- Absolute magnitude (H): 11.9

290 Bruna is a main belt asteroid that was discovered on 20 March 1890 by Johann Palisa, an Austrian astronomer at the Vienna Observatory.

Photometric observations of this asteroid at the Organ Mesa Observatory in Las Cruces, New Mexico, during 2008 gave a light curve with a period of 13.807 ± 0.001 hours and a brightness variation of 0.54 ± 0.04 in magnitude. Changes in the brightness of the minimum with phase angle is attributed to changes in the shadows across surface features.

It was named by Hofrath August Bielsa for Brünn, now Brno, Czech Republic, Bielsa's home town.
