= Giulia Bogliolo Bruna =

Italian anthropologist

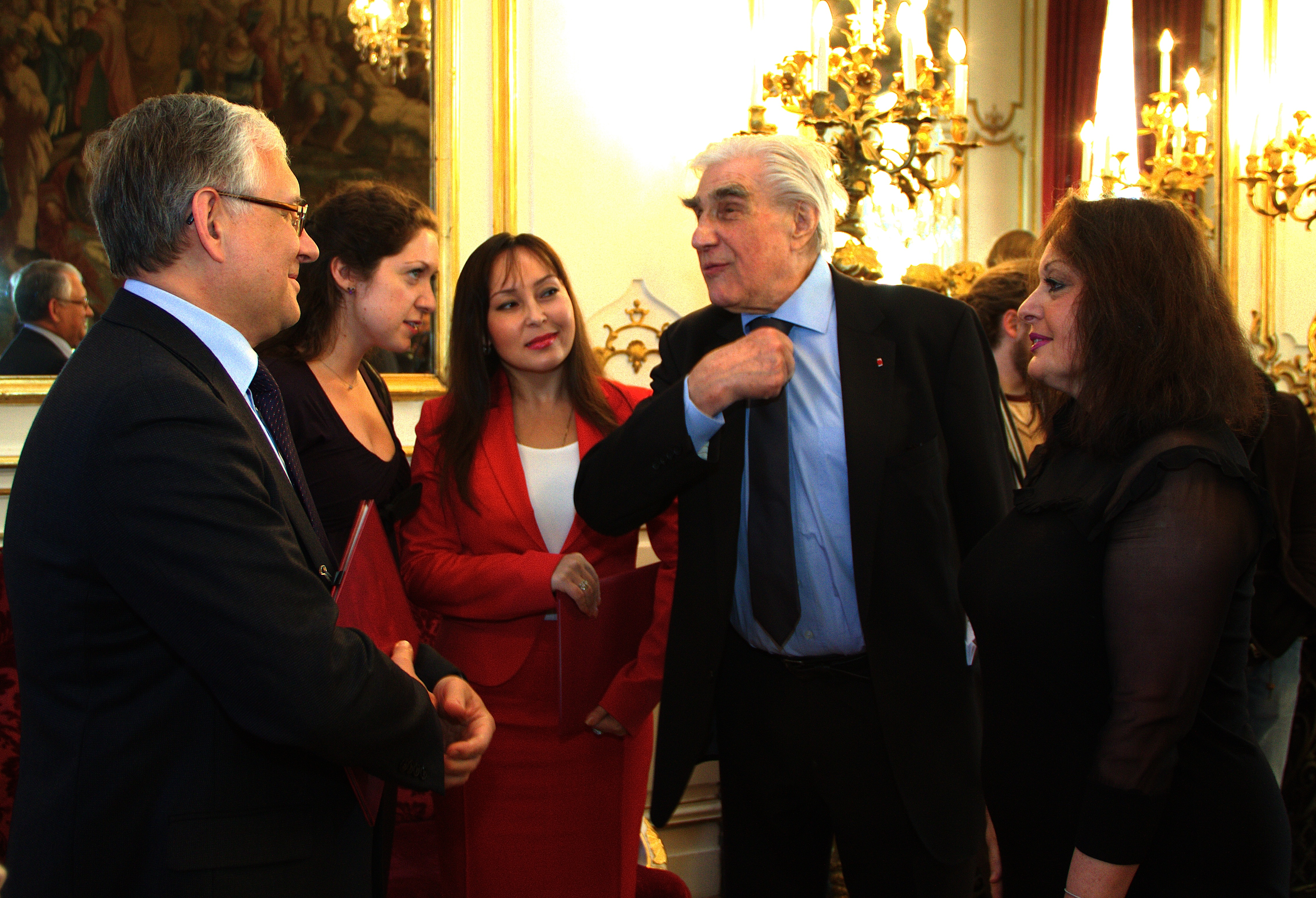
Jean Malaurie Medal of Honor ceremony, City of Strasbourg, 2013

Giulia Bogliolo Bruna is an Italian ethno-historian, living in France, specialist of the discovery travels at the Renaissance, of the imaginary (and the image) of the north and of the Inuit in Frencophone and Anglophone travel literature and of the Inuit, their culture and traditional art

A member of the prestigious Paris Centre of Arctic Studies, founded and directed by Jean Malaurie, she sits on the editorial board of Internord, International Review of Arctic Studies and, for two decades, of Thule, Italian review of American Studies .

She participated in the International Congress Arctic Problems, Environment, Society and Heritage, held in Paris, March 8 to 10, 2007, at the National Museum of Natural History (Muséum national d'histoire naturelle) under the honorary chairmanship of Jean Malaurie, which unveiled the International Polar Year celebrations in France.

She recently gave a series of lectures on traditional Inuit art (“Epiphanies of Inuit Shamanism: Songs, Amulets, and Objects of Memory”) and the image of the Inuit from the Renaissance to the Enlightenment (“From Fish-Men to Savages of the Savages”) as part of the series “At the Crossroads of Cultures”, promoted by the Barbier-Mueller Museum Cultural Foundation and the ARCH, under the sponsorship of the Société de Géographie.

Giulia Bogliolo Bruna is member of the Société de Géographie (Geographical Society) of Paris, of the Société des gens de lettres (as a professional writer) as well as the Società Geografica Italiana.

She is strongly committed in Human Rights promotion and knowledge transmission.

== Research topics ==
As a specialist of the discovery travels at the Renaissance, Giulia Bogliolo Bruna investigates the dynamic process of Inuit image evolution from the time of First Encounters to the Years 60. She also studies the tight relationship between the Inuit shaman (angakkuq) thinking and their artifacts, including the tupilaq.

As a researcher at the Centre of Arctic Studies, she published several scientific books, some of which devoted to great geo-ethnologist and writer Jean Malaurie's personality and thinking.

As a specialist of modern literature and poetry,, she published several poetic harvest and, in Italy, a major essay on Herman Melville. She received for her cultural commitment an Italian President's Representative Medal for her contribution to the Italian poetry and culture diffusion.

Giulia is, in addition, a specialist of Charles de Gaulle' image.

She has published more than 100 papers on anthropological, ethno-historic and litterary issues published in the top ranking reviews and journals.

== Books ==
Giulia Bogliolo Bruna authored a lot of scientific books that received more than 80 academic reviews worldwide:

- Herman Melville, "Profili di donne", opera a cura di Alberto Lehmann e Giulia Bogliolo Bruna, Maser (TV), Edizioni Amadeus, 1986.
- André Thevet (traduction, notes, introduction), Le singolarità della Francia Antartica, préface de Frank Lestringant, Reggio Emilia, Diabasis, 1997.
- Alla ricerca della quadratura del Circolo Polare : testimonianze e studi in onore di Jean Malaurie, "Il POLO", nos 25-26, 1999 (a cura di).
- Duc des Abruzzes, Expédition de l'Étoile polaire dans la Mer Arctique 1899-1900, Paris, coll. Polaires, Économica, 2004 (Préface).
- Au nom de la liberté, Actes de la XVIe Journée Mondiale de la Poésie, Association "Poesia-2 Ottobre" - Mairie du 14e Arrdt. de Paris chez Yvelinédition, 2005, (sous la direction).
- Thule, Rivista italiana di Studi Americanistici No. 16-17 Regards croisés sur l'objet ethnographique : autour des arts premiers, 2006 (sous la direction de).
- Amarcord, je me souviens, Actes de la XVIIe Journée Mondiale de la Poésie, Association "Poesia-2 Ottobre" de Paris- Centre d'Information et d'Études sur les Migrations Internationales chez Yvelinédition, Montigny-le-Bretonneux, 2006, (sous la direction de).
- Apparences trompeuses Sananguaq. Au cœur de la pensée inuit (préface Jean Malaurie, post-face Romolo Santoni), Latitude humaine, Yvelinédition, 2007.
- Femme, l'autre moitié du ciel, Actes de la XVIIIe Journée mondiale de la poésie, préface de Danièle Pourtaud, Éditions d'en Face, Paris, 2007, (sous la direction de).
- Jean Malaurie, une énergie créatrice, collection Lire et Comprendre, Editions Armand Colin, Paris, octobre 2012.
- Les objets messagers de la pensée inuit, collection Ethiques de la création, préface de Jean Malaurie, postface de Sylvie Dallet, Editions L'Harmattan / Institut Charles Cros, septembre 2015.
- Equilibri Artici. L'umanesimo ecologico di Jean Malaurie, prefazione di Anna Casella Paltrinieri, postfazione di Luisa Faldini, Roma, Edizioni CISU, collana "Ethno-grafie americane", settembre 2016.
- Terra Madre. In omaggio all'immaginario della nazione inuit, di Jean Malaurie, traduzione e prefazione di Giulia Bogliolo Bruna, Milano, EDUCatt, 2017.
- Miroirs de l'âme, voyages en esprit, edited by Giulia Bogliolo Bruna & Adrien Viel, Paris, Editions L'Harmattan / Institut Charles Cros, in partnership with Fondation culturelle Musée Barbier-Mueller, ARCH, Chaire IPAG "Entreprise inclusive", November 2025.

== Among her academic papers ==
- Bogliolo Bruna Giulia (2024/2025). Jean Malaurie: To Dare, Act and Create. Electra, 27, winter 2024/25, EDP Fundaçao, Portugal.
- Bogliolo Bruna Giulia (2024/2025). Jean Malaurie: ousar, agir e criar. Electra, 27, Fundaçao EDP, Portugal.
- Bogliolo Bruna Giulia (2024). Résister à l'oubli, les messages de l'art inuit traditionnel. Apulée, n°9 "Art & politique", 270-282.
- Bogliolo Bruna Giulia (2024). Itinérances poétiques, sur les pas de Jean Malaurie, Apulée, n°9 "Art & politique", 288-293.
- Bogliolo Bruna Giulia (2024). Louons maintenant les grands hommes: Jean Malaurie. Geostorie. Bollettino e Notiziario del Centro Italiano per gli Studi Storico-Geografici, 32(1), 27-36.
- Bogliolo Bruna Giulia (2021). Une sauvage si sauvage: une esquimaude qui n'en était pas une..... Geostorie. Bollettino e Notiziario del Centro Italiano per gli Studi Storico-Geografici, 29(2), 77–105.
- Bogliolo Bruna Giulia (2021). La vox Eskimaux dans l'Encyclopédie de Diderot et d'Alembert: archéologie d'une dissonance cognitive. Libri, atti e raccolte di saggi, 175–194.
- Bogliolo Bruna Giulia (2018). Mysterium fascinans et tremendum': la conturbante e vorace tupinambá nelle singolarità della Francia antartica'del cosmografo André Thevet. Visioni LatinoAmericane, 18(2018), Supplemento al Numero 18. Brasile-Italia: andata e ritorno. Storia, cultura, società. Confronti interdisciplinari, Trieste, EUT Edizioni Università di Trieste, 292–313.
- Bogliolo Bruna Giulia (2015). Disclosing an Unknown Source of the Eskimo Entry of Diderot & d'Alembert's Encyclopédie. Journal of Literature and Art Studies, 9(11), 1139–1148.
- Bogliolo Bruna Giulia (2015). Shamanism Influence in Inuit Art-Dorset Period, Journal of Literature and Art Studies, 2015, 5(4), 271-281.
- Bogliolo Bruna Giulia (2014). Esquimaux des Lumières": archéologie d'un regard entravé, revue ANUAC, 3(1), 2014, 1–19].
- Bogliolo Bruna Giulia (2011). Des races monstrueuses aux peuples maudits, des préadamites aux Homines religiosi: l'image des Esquimaux dans la littérature de voyage (XVIe siècle-première moitié du XVIIIE siècle). Internord, Revue Internationale d'Études Arctiques, 21, Editions du Centre National de la Recherche Scientifique (C.N.R.S), 167–188.
- Bogliolo Bruna Giulia (2011). L'œuvre internationale du Centre d'Études Arctiques. Internord, Revue Internationale d'Études Arctiques, 21, Editions du Centre National de la Recherche Scientifique (C.N.R.S.), 315–320.
- Bogliolo Bruna Giulia (2010). L'immagine dell'Altro..., Geostorie, Anno 18 - n.1-2 - gennaio -agosto 2010, 193– 204.
- Bogliolo Bruna Giulia (2011). Intervista a Jeorge Estevez, Taino. A lui non piace il sapote verde. in Sfumature di rosso. In Territorio Indiano con i Primi Americani, a cura di Naila Clerici, Moncalieri, SOCONAS INCOMINDIOS, 59–64.
- Bogliolo Bruna Giulia (2011). Intermondes: jeu d'identités et réappropriation des racines. Un Inuit de la toundra à la guerre de Corée. XXXII International Americanistic Studies Congress, Perugia.
- Bogliolo Bruna Giulia (2010). Rêver l'Arctique et l'enseigner : les ambigüités de la planche Rossignol« Climat Froid » à l'heure de la décolonisation. XXXI International Americanistic Studies Congress, Perugia.
- Bogliolo Bruna Giulia (2009). Intermondi. Il richiamo del Sacro, GEOSTORIE, Bollettino e Notiziario del Centro Italiano per gli Studi Storico-Geografici, gennaio-aprile 2009, 119-123.
- Bogliolo Bruna Giulia (2008). Préadamites, Juifs errants, Tartares? Des "origines" des Esquimaux d´après les sources documentaires et littéraires des XVIe-XVIIIe siècle, International Americanistic Studies Congress, Perugia, 987-996.
- Bogliolo Bruna Giulia (2007). De la merveille à la curiosité. La perception du "Théâtre due la Nature Universelle" chez les voyageurs, marchands et savants de la Renaissance. Naturalia, mirabilia & monstruosa en el mundo iberico, siglos XVI-XIX : VI Coloquio International Mediadores Culturales, Lovania y Amberes, 1-29.
- Bogliolo Bruna Giulia (2002).Explorer les cartes, les textes et les images : en quête de pygmées arctiques et d'homme-poissons. Prolégomènes à la première rencontre, in Séminaire de Jean Malaurie (sous la direction de Jean Malaurie, Dominique Sewane (coord.), De la vérité in ethnologie, Paris, Economica, Collection Polaires, 79-96.
- Bogliolo Bruna Giulia (2002). Mestizaje de técnicas practicas y conocimientos en los inuit del Grand Norte de Canada y Groenlandia (siglos XVI-XIX), in Eduardo França Paiva, Carla Maria Junho Anastasia organizadores O Trabalho mestiço. Maneiras de Pensar e Formas de Viver Séculos XVI a XIX, São Paulo, Annablume, PPGH/UFMG.
- Bogliolo Bruna Giulia (2002). Pigmei, Ciclopi ed Antropofagi del Grande Nord: le ambiguità di uno sguardo preformato (sec.XVI-XVIII). XXIV International Americanistic Studies Congress, Perugia 10, 11, 12 May 2002/ São Paulo, Brasile 6, 7, 8 August 2002, Centro Studi Americanistici Circolo Amerindiano / ARGO, 79-86.
- Bogliolo Bruna Giulia (2000). Du mythe à la réalité: l'image des Esquimaux dans la littérature de voyage (XVI-XVIIIe siècles). in Commission of History of International Relations, Oslo 2000 Commémorative Volume, Papers for the XIX International Congress of Historical Sciences, Oslo.
- Bogliolo Bruna Giulia (2000). Quando l'anernira si fa canto e memoria..., Rivista di Studi Canadesi Canadian Studies Review Suppl., 13/2000, 16-27.
- Bogliolo Bruna Giulia (1999). Passer les frontières: les Inuit du Labrador (fin du XVIe-première moitié du XVIIIe)? in Rui Manuel Loureiro & Serge Gruzinski (Ed.), Passar as fronteiras, II Colóquio International sobre Mediadores Culturais, Séculos XV a XVIII, Lagos.
- Bogliolo Bruna Giulia (1997). Paese degli Iperborei, Ultima Thule, Paradiso Terrestre. Lo spazio boreale come altrove transgeografico ed escatologico dall'Antichità a Mercatore, Columbeis, VI Genova, D.AR.FI.CL.ET., 1997 (Stefano Pittaluga Ed.), 161-178.
- Bogliolo Bruna Giulia (1996). Dalla descrizione testuale all'immagine grafica: l'inquietante tupinambá, la bella "floridienne" e la morigerata eschimese: l'alterità al femminile, ovvero lo "choc" esotico, sensuale e simbolico della Scoperta nella letteratura odeporica del XVI secolo, Atti del XXVI Congresso Geografico Italieno, (Genova, 4-9 mai 1992), Ed. Claudio Cerreti, Roma, Istituto dell'Enciclopedia Italiana Giovanni Treccani, 767-777.
- Bogliolo Bruna Giulia (1995). De Gaulle dans les manuels italiens de la Scuola Media Inferiore, in De Gaulle enseigné dans le monde, Table ronde organisée au Sénat par la Fondation Charles de Gaulle le 22 mai 1995, Paris, Cahier de la Fondation Charles de Gaulle, no 2/1995, 9-33.
- Bogliolo Bruna Giulia (1995). I resoconti dell'Accademia delle Scienze di Parigi sull'attività geocartografica di Agostino Codazzi in Venezuela Cinquecento, Miscellanea di Storia delle Esplorazioni, XX, Genova, Bozzi, 235-265.
- Bogliolo Bruna Giulia (1994). Singularitez, testimonianza etnografica, allegoria : l'immagine degli Eschimesi nell'iconografia del Rinascimento in Atti Convegno Messina 14-15 ottobre 1993 Esplorazioni geografiche e immagine del mondo nei secoli XV et XVI, a cura di Simonetta Ballo Alagna, 255-267.
- Bogliolo Bruna Giulia (1994). La cultura materiale degli Eschimesi del Labrador in alcune fonti documentarie della Nouvelle France (1650-1750), IL POLO, 1 (marzo 1994), 19-28.
- Bogliolo Bruna Giulia, Lehmann Alberto (1994). Visbooc : pesci, mostri marini e « Savages of the northe ». una testimonianza sugli Eschimesi in Europa nella seconda metà del Cinquecento, Miscellanea di Storia delle Esplorazioni, XIX, Genova, Bozzi, 55-66.
- Bogliolo Bruna Giulia (1993). Journal de Louis Jolliet allant à la descouverte de Labrador, païs des Esquimaux », 1694. La prima fonte etnostorica sugli Inuit del Labrador, Atti del V Convegno internazionale di studi dell'Associazione per il Medioevo e l'Umanesimo Latini, Relazioni di viaggio e conoscenza del mondo fra Medioevo e Umanesimo, Genova, 12-15 dicembre 1991 (Stefano Pittaluga Ed.), Genova, Dipartimento di Archeologia, Filologia Classica, 591-615.
- Bogliolo Bruna Giulia (1992). Premiers regards des Occidentaux sur les Inuit?, DESTINS CROISES Cinq siècles de rencontres avec les Amérindiens, Paris, UNESCO Bibliothèque Albin Michel, 393-410.
- Bogliolo Bruna Giulia (1990). Colonizzazione ed etnocidio nella "Description géographique" di Nicolas Denys, Columbeis, IV, Gênes, D.AR.FI.CL.ET., 375-390.
- Bogliolo Bruna Giulia (1990). La place du général de Gaulle dans les livres scolaires italiens, in De Gaulle en son siècle, tome 1, Dans la mémoire des hommes et des hommes et des peuples, Actes des Journées internationales tenues à l'UNESCO, Paris, 19-24 novembre 1990, Paris, Institut Charles de Gaulle-Plon-La Documentation française, 1990, 369-382.
- Bogliolo Bruna Giulia (1988). Dalla realtà al mito: "Les Nouveaux Voyages aux Indes Occidentales" di M. Jean-Bernard Bossu, Miscellanea di Storia delle Esplorazioni, XIII, Genova, Bozzi, 165-192.
- Bogliolo Bruna Giulia (1988). Tracce di conoscenze cartografiche presso alcune tribù indiane del Nordamerica nella prima metà del sec. XVIII, Miscellanea di Storia delle Esplorazioni, XIII, Genova, Bozzi, 149-164.
- Bogliolo Bruna Giulia (1988). Amazzoni o cannibali, vergini o madri, sante o prostitute..., Columbeis, III, Genova, D.AR.FI.CL.ET., 215-264.
- Bogliolo Bruna Giulia (1988). Dalla realtà al mito: "Les Nouveaux Voyages aux Indes Occidentales" di M. Jean-Bernard Bossu, Miscellanea di Storia delle Esplorazioni, XIII, Genova, Bozzi, 165–192.
- Bogliolo Bruna Giulia (1988). Tracce di conoscenze cartografiche presso alcune tribù indiane del Nordamerica nella prima metà del sec. XVIII, Miscellanea di Storia delle Esplorazioni, XIII, Genova, Bozzi, 149-164.
- Bogliolo Bruna Giulia (1987). Uno sguardo protoetnografico sull'amerindio: "Les Nouveaux Voyages aux Indes Occidentales" di M. Jean-Bernard Bossu. Miscellanea di Storia delle Esplorazioni, XII, Genova, Bozzi, 93-118.
- Lehmann Alberto, Bogliolo Bruna Giulia (1987). All'insegna del "soggettivo": la poliedrica visione dell'omosessuale nelle popolazioni "primitive" del Nuovo Mondo, come effetto di pregiudizio da parte di relatori e memorialisti, Miscellanea di Storia delle Esplorazioni, XII, Genova, Bozzi, 73-92.
- Bogliolo Bruna Giulia (1986). La relazione sulla baia di Hudson di "Monsieur Jérémie", Miscellanea di Storia delle Esplorazioni, XI, Genova, Bozzi, 39-70.
- Bogliolo Bruna Giulia (1985). Una fonte inedita sulla tratta degli schiavi nel Madagascar precoloniale: le "Lettres Madagascaroises" di M. De Valgny, Miscellanea di Storia delle Esplorazioni, X, Genova, Bozzi, 147-170.
- Bogliolo Bruna Giulia (1978). Il Madagascar in una lettera di M. De Barry all'Accademia reale delle Scienze di Parigi, Miscellanea di Storia delle Esplorazioni, IX, Genova, Bozzi, 53-70.
- Bogliolo Bruna Giulia (1978). Alcune lettere dalla Cina dell'agostiniano Sigismondo Meynardi da San Nicola. Miscellanea di Storia delle Esplorazioni, III, Genova, Bozzi, 127-151.
- Bogliolo Bruna Giulia (1977). Una fonte sconosciuta del Botero : l'Historia de la China di Juan Gonzalez de Mendoza, in Miscellanea di Storia delle Esplorazioni, II, Genova, Bozzi, 48-78.

== See also ==
- Inuit
- Inuit art
- Inuit religion
- André Thévet
- Jean Malaurie
- Martin Frobisher
- John Davis (explorer)
