= Ian Brune =

South African cricketer (1949–2014)

Personal information
- Full name: Ian John Brune
- Born: 29 October 1949; Mufulira, Northern Rhodesia
- Died: 20 July 2014 (aged 64); Durban, South Africa
- Source: Cricinfo, 13 April 2016

Ian Brune (29 October 1949 – 20 July 2014) was a South African cricketer. He played one first-class match for Orange Free State in 1968/69.
