= Bruni 3V-1 Eolo =

3V-1 Eolo
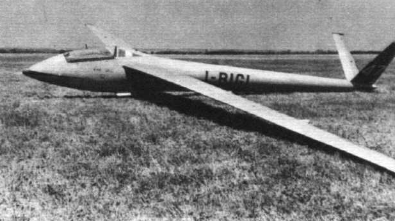

General information
- Type: High performance glider
- National origin: Italy
- Manufacturer: SIAI-Marchetti
- Designer: Giovanni Bruni
- Number built: 1

History
- First flight: August 1955

The Bruni 3V-1 Eolo was a single seat Italian competition glider, first flown in 1955. It took part World Gliding Championships of 1956 but retired early after sustaining damage.

== Design and development ==
The Bruni 3V-1 Eolo, sometimes known as the SIAI-Marchetti Eolo 3V-1, was a high performance sailplane designed by Giovanni Bruni in Italy in the early 1950s. The 3V-1 was built by a collaboration between SIAI-Marchetti and the Alessandro Passeleva Soaring Sports Club of Vergiate. The high performance sailplane, intended for competitions and record breaking, was an all wooden cantilever mid-wing aircraft, with a high aspect ratio, single spar wing which was sharply tapered in plan and mounted with 3° of dihedral. The wing was covered with unusually thick plywood to maintain the laminar profile and its tips carried "salmons", small streamlined bodies intended to minimise induced drag. Narrow slotted control surfaces filled the whole trailing edge, each occupying about a third of the span; the outermost were conventional ailerons, followed by a second set of ailerons which drooped when the flaps on the inboard third of the wing were lowered. The Eolo had a pair of mid-chord airbrakes mounted just behind the wing spar, each with sixteen blades deployed above and below the wing surfaces. In the initial version there were inboard leading edge tanks that could hold 32 kg (71 lb) of water ballast.

The Eolo's fuselage was a wood framed, ply skinned semi-monocoque of elliptical cross-section. Behind a pointed nose the pilot sat under a long, one piece canopy which extended rearwards almost to the wing leading edge where it was smoothly blended into the fuselage. It had a straight tapered V-tail with surfaces at 110°, ending in salmons, like the wings. The elevators were equipped with trim tabs. The glider had a monowheel undercarriage, equipped with a brake, which retracted behind two doors. There was also a sprung tailskid and a small protective nose skid.

The Eolo first flew in August 1955. A year later it competed in the World Gliding Championships held at Saint-Yan but had to retire after an accident on the third day.

== Specifications (3V-1 Eolo) ==
Data from The World's Sailplanes - Die Segelflugzeuge der Welt - Les Planeurs de le Monde (1958)

General characteristics

- Capacity: One
- Length: 8.55 m (28 ft 1 in)
- Wingspan: 20.00 m (65 ft 7 in)
- Wing area: 16.00 m^{2} (172.2 sq ft)
- Aspect ratio: 25
- Airfoil: root : NACA 65_{3}618; tip : NACA 65_{1}612
- Empty weight: 329.5 kg (726 lb)

365 kg (805 lb) equipped

- Max takeoff weight: 450 kg (992 lb)

Performance

- Stall speed: 40 km/h (25 mph, 22 kn) with full flaps (50°)

60 km/h (37 mph; 32 kn) no flaps

- Never exceed speed: 230 km/h (140 mph, 120 kn)
- Airbrake limiting speed: 160 km/h (99 mph; 86 kn)
- Aerotow speed: 100–130 km/h (62–81 mph; 54–70 kn)
- Maximum glide ratio: 32.8:1 at 96.5 km/h (60.0 mph)
- Rate of sink: 0.79 m/s (156 ft/min) at 92 km/h (57 mph)
- Wing loading: 28.1 kg/m^{2} (5.8 lb/sq ft)
