= Adolf Brune =

American composer

Adolf Gerhard Brune (1870–1935) was an American composer, born in Germany; he came to the United States in 1870. He taught composition at the Chicago Musical College. His output was mainly orchestral, and included three symphonies, two piano concertos, and four overtures. He also wrote five string quartets and two string quintets, among other chamber works.
