= HMS Brune =

Three ships of the Royal Navy were named Brune, two of them were vessels captured from the French.

- HMS Brune (1761), a Blonde-class frigate
- HMS Brune (1808), a Nymphe-class frigate
- HMS Brune (1856), a Bann-class gunboat
