= Gustavo Maria Bruni =

- Born: 6 May 1903
- Died: 10 February 1911 (aged 7)

Gustavo Maria Bruni (6 May 1903 - 10 February 1911) was an Italian boy for whom a beatification process has been opened by the Roman Catholic Church. He was a pious child who expressed a desire to be a priest and exhibited unusual holiness for a small child. He died of typhus at the age of seven.
