= Rabbi Ilai II =

Rabbi Ilai (Hebrew: אלעאי or עילאי), also recorded as Rabbi Ela (אלעא, אילא), Hela, Ilaa, Ili, La, Leia, or Yela, was an amora of the Land of Israel, of the third generation of Amoraim, who lived in the late 3rd–early 4th centuries.

== Biography ==
Rabbi Ilai II was a disciple of R. Yochanan bar Nafcha and R. Shimon ben Lakish. Among his disciples, one can find the leading figures of the fourth amoraic generation, such as Rav Jonah, Rav Zeira, Ravin and more.

In one form or another, his name frequently appears in both Yerushalmi and Bavli, mostly in the field of the halakhah. He was so distinguished that his contemporary and friend Rabbi Zeira, admiring Ela's acumen, exclaimed, "The very air of Israel imparts wisdom". On two other occasions, the same Zeira entitled him "Bannaya d'Oraita" (Builder of the Law: creator of fine legal points).

He carried his theoretical knowledge into actual life, so that the very appointments of his house afforded object-lessons in rabbinic rites. It is related that when on a certain Friday his duties detained him at college until late at night, and, returning home, he found the entrance barred and the people asleep, rather than desecrate the Sabbath by knocking at the gate for admission, he spent the night on the steps of his house.

== Teachings ==
In halakhic exegesis Ela laid down the guiding rule, "[Every textual interpretation must respect the subject of the context". Another and the most frequently cited of his exegetic rules is, "Wherever the Bible uses any of the terms 'beware,' 'lest,' or 'not,' a prohibitory injunction is involved". Quite a number of exegetical observations applied to halakhic deductions are preserved under Ela's name, and he reports like interpretations by his predecessors. Ela also appears in aggadah, but only rarely transmits the aggadic teachings of others. That psychological test of human character as betrayed in the passions produced "by the cup, by cash, and by choler", which some ascribe to this Ela (Ilai), others ascribe to Rabbi Ilai I.

Eulogizing R. Shimon bar Zevid, Ela skilfully interweaves several verses from the Book of Job, to which he adds simply their application to Shimon's death, thus: "'Where shall wisdom be found? and where is the place of understanding?' 'The depth says, It is not in me; and the sea says, It is not with me' 'It is hidden from the eyes of all living, and kept close from the fowls of the air'. The four objects necessary to man, if lost, may be replaced; for 'there is a vein for the silver, and a place for gold which they rfine. Iron is taken out of the earth, and brass is molten out of the stone'; but when a scholar dies, who can take his place? We have lost Shimon: from where shall we procure his like?"
