= Brunn (surname) =

Brunn is a German surname. Notable people with the surname include:

- Anke Brunn (born 1942), German economist and politician (SPD).
- Christian Valentin Brunn (born 1994), German DJ
- Francis Brunn (1922–2004), German juggler
- George Le Brunn (1863–1905), British songwriter
- Gustav Brunn, German immigrant to the United States, developer of the Old Bay Seasoning blend
- Heinrich Brunn (1822–1894), German archaeologist
- Hermann Brunn (1862–1939), German mathematician
- James von Brunn (1920–2010), American murderer
