= Francesco Bruni (linguist) =

Italian linguist (1943–2025)

Francesco Bruni (19 March 1943 – 24 June 2025) was an Italian linguist, literary historian, and Italianist, who was a member of the Accademia della Crusca.

== Life and career ==
Bruni was born on 19 March 1943 in Perugia. He studied Classical Literature at the University of Naples, a pupil of Salvatore Battaglia, with whom he graduated on 5 July 1965, discussing a thesis on Romance philology entitled Problems and discussions of Aristotelian "Poetics": Sperone Speroni, Benedetto Varchi, Alessandro Piccolomini.

After graduating, he held the Neapolitan chairs of Romance Philology and of Italian Literature. In the same years, he obtained teaching positions at the University of Bari and at the University of Salerno.

He was directly dedicated to teaching the Italian language, with courses aimed at both native speakers and second-language learners: he held courses at the University for Foreigners of Perugia.

In 1991, he moved to Ca' Foscari University of Venice, to teach at the chair of "History of the Italian language", a position that lasted until his retirement in 2010.

Bruni died on 24 June 2025, at the age of 82.
