= French frigate Brune =

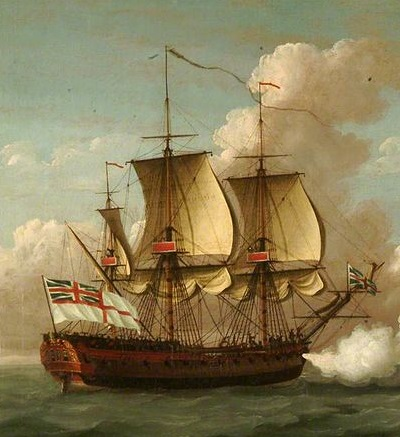
- HMS Brune in 1762, during the Seven Years' War. From a painting by John Cleveley the Elder

History

France
- Name: Brune
- Namesake: Brune river
- Builder: Le Havre, plans by Jean-Joseph Ginoux
- Laid down: September 1754
- Launched: 7 September 1755
- In service: March 1756
- Captured: by Britain, 30 January 1761

Great Britain
- Name: HMS Brune
- Acquired: 1761
- Fate: Sold on 2 October 1792

General characteristics
- Class & type: Blonde-class frigate
- Displacement: 880 tonneaux
- Tons burthen: 480 port tonneaux
- Length: 109 ft 0 in (33.22 m) (gundeck); 131 ft 2 in (39.98 m) (overall)
- Beam: 34 ft 7.5 in (10.554 m)
- Depth of hold: 10 ft 7.5 in (3.239 m)
- Complement: 220
- Armament: 32 guns comprising: Gun deck: 26 × 12-pounder guns; Quarterdeck: 4 × 6-pounder guns; Forecastle: 2 × 6-pounder guns

Brune was a Blonde-class 30-gun frigate of the French Navy. She took part in the naval battles of the Seven Year War, and was captured by the British. Recommissioned in the Royal Navy as the 32-gun HMS Brune, she served until 1792.

== Career ==
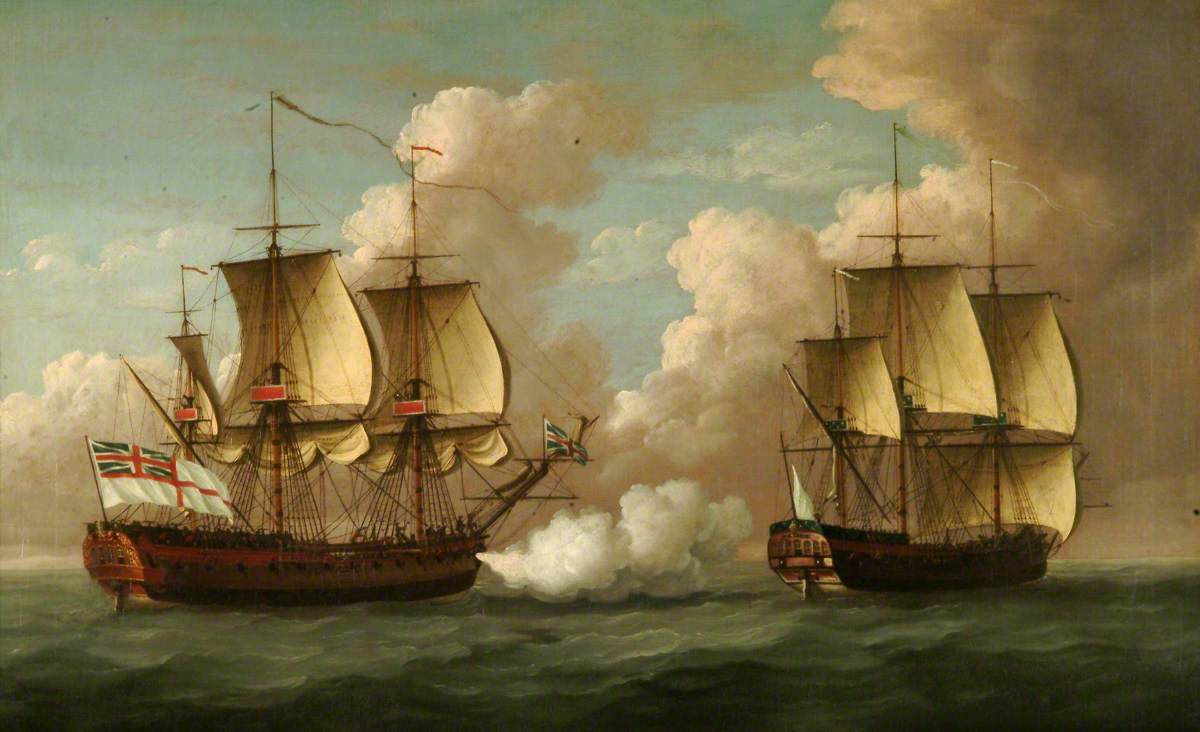
HMS Brune captures Oiseau in 1762

Brune was ordered in January 1753, and named on 7 January 1753. In 1757, she served in a squadron under Rear-admiral Beaufremont to ferry troops to Saint-Domingue.

She served as a coast-guard until August 1758, when she was decommissioned.

On 18 March, she was recommissioned in Brest. On 30 January 1762, she was captured by the frigates HMS Venus and HMS Juno, after a two-hour fight.

Recommissioned in the Royal Navy as HMS Brune, she captured the French frigate Oiseau on 23 October 1762.

In 1780, she captured a French ship Renard (Note: Possibly the xebec Renard, recently sold.)

She was sold on 2 October 1792.
