= Brun (surname) =

Brun, Brün or de Brún is a surname. As a German surname, "Brun" may be derived from the color "brown" or as a truncation of the given names such as Brunhart or Brunold, cf. Brune, Braune. Notable people with the surname include:

- Ane Brun (born 1976), Norwegian singer/songwriter
- Bairbre de Brún (born 1954), Irish politician
- Charles Brun (France) (1821–1897), French Navy engineer and politician
- Charles Brun (Denmark) (1866–1919), Danish politician
- Eske Brun (1904–1987), politician in Greenland
- Frédéric Brun (writer) (born 1960), French writer
- Friederike Brun (1765–1835), Danish author and salonist
- Herbert Brün (1918–2000), German-American composer of electronic music
- Johan Nordahl Brun (1745–1816), Norwegian poet, dramatist, bishop, and politician
- Johanne Brun (1874–1954), Danish opera singer
- Johannes Brun (disambiguation)
  - Johannes Brun (1832–1890), Norwegian stage actor
  - Johannes Brun (officer) (1891–1977), Norwegian military officer and bridge champion
- Joseph C. Brun (1907–1998), French-American cinematographer
- Julian Brun (1886–1943), Polish journalist and historian
- Marie-Marguerite Brun (1713–1794), French lexicographer and poet
- Pádraig de Brún (1889–1960), Irish clergyman, mathematician and classical scholar
- Philippe Brun (musician) (1908–1994), French jazz trumpeter
- Philippe Brun (politician) (born 1991), French politician
- Roy Brun (born 1953), American judge and politician
- Rudolf Brun (1290s–1360), leader of the Zürich guilds' revolution of 1336 and the city's first independent mayor
- Thomas Brun, 12th century clerk of King Henry I of England and almoner of King Henry II
- Todd Brun, American engineer and physicist
- Viggo Brun (1885–1978), Norwegian professor and mathematician
- Walter Brun (born 1942), Swiss former racing driver and founder of Brun Motorsport, an auto racing team
