= Brunskill =

Brunskill (/bɹʌnskɪl/ BR-un-SK-ill; Old Norse: Brúnskjallr [b⟨ɾ⟩ʌnskjʊl⟨ɾ⟩]; Anglo-Saxon runes: ᛒᚱᚢᚾᛋᚳᛡᛖᛚᚱ) is a rare Viking ornamental surname derived from Old English and Old Norse. It is thought to have originated during the early Middle Ages in Scandinavian York (in the north of what is now England) and based on the River Skell.

== Etymology ==
The most likely direct translation is 'brown resounding' which would mean 'a person with a brown physical feature who lives near a rapid, loud watercourse'.

The first surnames in England were initially used almost like a nickname to describe an individual, such as their occupation, father's name, location of birth, or a physical feature (such as hair, complexion, or clothing), and were not necessarily inherited. Viking surnames are often toponymic (denoting the local landscape) and surnames of Old Norse origin are often ornamental (combining two descriptions); a common example is Nordström, meaning 'a person who lives north of the stream' or 'a person who lives by the stream in the north'.

=== Translation ===
==== Brun ====
Old English/Old Norse: brún = brown

Anglo-Saxon runes: ᛒᚱᚢᚾᛋ

==== Skill ====
Old Norse: 'skjallr' = resounding (a noise loud enough to reverberate) meaning a rapid and loud watercourse.

Anglo-Saxon runes: ᛋᚳᛡᛖᛚᚱ

It's also possible that 'skill' is derived from the Old English 'gil'. This translates to 'gill' (or 'ghyll') which is a word used for ravines (narrow valleys) specifically in northern England and parts of Scotland. See below for more information on this theory.

Due to the similarity in spelling of 'skjallr' and 'skill' and the prevalence of the 'Brunskill' spelling rather than a variation of 'Brungil' or 'Brunsgill', one may choose to believe the original spelling would be 'Brúnskjallr'.

=== Pronunciation ===
==== Original ====
The Old English/Old Norse pronunciation of Brúnskjallr is thought to have been: b-r-oon-sk-yull-r (/b⟨ɾ⟩ʌnskjʊl⟨ɾ⟩/).

- The Rs are pronounced as a trilled R. The second R might have an UH sound like in 'weather'
- The Ú is pronounced with an OO sound like in 'broom'
- The J is pronounced as a Y
- The A is pronounced with an AH sound like in 'father'

==== Contemporary ====
Nowadays Brunskill is pronounced as it would typically look to an English speaker and without a trilled R: br-un-sk-ill (/bɹʌnskɪl/).

=== Modern Variations ===
Throughout history before many people could read and write, words were often not written down and only communicated verbally. Until the standardisation of English, there have been varying spellings of the surname which still exist today albeit even rarer; Brunskill being the most common variation.

Examples of other variations are:

- Brunskell
- Brunskyll
- Bronskill

It's been noted that Brunskill may derive from 'Brunhyll' which translates to 'brown hill'. This would lead to variations such as Brunhill or Brownhill. This is unlikely because the addition of both the S and K sounds in place of the H sound in 'Brunskill' are quite prominent forming a stark difference in pronunciation.

=== Geographical origin ===
It's believed that Brunskill originates in/near Yorkshire. This is because the two most likely translations from 'skill' are unique and specific while also being similar as they're about watercourses in the Yorkshire area.

==== The 'skjallr' theory ====
The River Skell, which runs through Ripon, North Yorkshire, is derived from the Old Norse 'skjallr'. The only other known watercourse with the word 'skell' is The Skell near Doncaster, South Yorkshire. It's possible the first Brunskills were named after one of these watercourses, especially when considering 'skell' is a variant to 'skill'. The E in 'skell' could have been pronounced sk-yell (/skjɛl/) due to the Y sound from the J in 'skjallr'. This could also sound like skee-el (/skjɪɛl/), thus being mistaken as or evolving into skeel (/skiːl/) (like steel) to spell 'skill'.

It may be more likely that the surname is based specifically on the River Skell because there's very little evidence of The Skell's etymology and history, whereas the River Skell is known to be derived from 'skjallr' and to in fact have "a swift and noisy course". In addition to this, the River Skell is a much larger and more prominent watercourse meaning it covers a larger area for settlements and has more access to water and food sources.

==== The 'gil' theory ====
It's possible that the first Brunskills were named after various gills rather than specifically the River Skell. Most gills are found in and around the Yorkshire Dales. An area of the River Skell actually forms a ravine called Skellding (deriving from 'skjallr' and 'denu' translating to 'resounding valley') and there's another area along the river called Skell Gill Wood. In addition to this, the pronunciation of 'Brunskill' and 'Brunsgill' are very similar. On the other hand, there's little to no evidence of the use of the spelling variations 'brunsgill' or even 'brungill' as surnames.

== Frequency ==
Brunskill is a very rare surname ranked as the ~186,000th most common in the world and around 6000th most common in England. As of 2014 it was most prevalent in England, followed by the United States and Australia. Comparing to Brown which is ranked as the 206th most common in the world and 4th most common in England.

== Notable people ==
=== Ireland ===
- Gerald Brunskill (politician) (1866–1918), politician
- John Brunskill (1875–1940), cricketer

=== United Kingdom ===
- George Brunskill (1799–1866), coloniser (see: Marryatville, South Australia)
- Gerald Brunskill (1897–1964), British Army officer
- Ian Brunskill (born 1976), footballer
- Muriel Brunskill (1899–1980), contralto
- Norman Brunskill (1912–1988), footballer
- Ronald Brunskill (1929–2015), academic

=== United States ===
- Daniel Brunskill (born 1994), American football player
- Emma Brunskill, computer scientist

== Places named after Brunskills ==
=== Settlements ===
There are no settlements named after a Brunskill but there are a few places likely deriving from 'skjallr' which would suggest Brunskill is based on it.

==== United Kingdom ====
===== Along the River Skell =====
- Skell Beck
- Skell Gill Wood
- Skelding
- Skell Bank Wood
- Skelton-on-Ure

===== Along The Skell =====
- Skelbrooke
- Skellow

===== Elsewhere =====
- Skell Gill, Leyburn, North Yorkshire
- Skelsmergh, Kendal, Cumbria

=== Roads ===
==== Australia ====
- Brunskill Avenue - Forest Hill, New South Wales
- Brunskill Road - Gregadoo, New South Wales
- Brunskill Road - Lake Albert, New South Wales

==== Canada ====
- Brunskill Way - Ottawa, Ontario

==== New Zealand ====
- Brunskill Road - Te Miro, Waikato

=== Schools ===
==== Canada ====
- Brunskill School - Saskatoon, Saskatchewan, Canada

== Similar surnames ==
- Brun
- Skelding

== See also ==
- Anglo-Saxons
- Brun (disambiguation)
- Danelaw
- Early medieval England
- Jorvik Viking Centre
- Viking Age
