= Celina Bobińska =

Polish historian (1913–1997)

- Born: 24 December 1913; Kraków
- Died: 10 June 1997 (aged 83); Kraków
- Citizenship: Polish
- Occupation: Historian

Academic background
- Doctoral advisor: Vladimir Picheta

Celina Bobińska (24 December 1913 – 10 June 1997) was a historian and communist activist.

== Biography ==
The daughter of Stanisław Bobiński and Helena Bobińska, the niece of Julian Brun, the cousin of Celina Budzyńska. She studied under Vladimir Picheta, attending seminar led by him from Autumn 1943, alongside Żanna Kormanowa. In 1945, Bobińska defended her doctoral dissertation at Moscow State University on the socio-economic views of Stanisław Staszic during the Four-Year Sejm (Общественно-экономические взгляды Станислава Сташица в эпоху Четырехлетнего сейма).

Her doctoral students included Andrzej Chwalba and Marian Zgórniak.

She was buried at the Rakowicki Cemetery.

== Edited works ==
- Studia z dziejów wsi małopolskiej w drugiej połowie XVIII wieku. 1957.
- Kraków jako ośrodek towarowy Małopolski Zachodniej w drugiej połowie XVIII wieku. 1959.

== Accolades ==
- Knight's Cross of the Order of Polonia Restituta (28 September 1954)
- Order of the Banner of Labour, 2nd class (1964)
