= Gerald Brunskill =

Gerald Brunskill may refer to:

- Gerald Brunskill (politician) (1866–1918), Irish politician, MP (1910)
- Gerald Brunskill (British Army officer) (1897–1964), British Army officer
