= Brungs =

Brungs is a German surname, a patronymic derivation from the given name or nickname Brun, "brown". Notable people with the surname include:

- Attila Brungs, Australian academic
- Franz Brungs, German footballer
