= Żanna Kormanowa =

Polish historian (1900–1988)

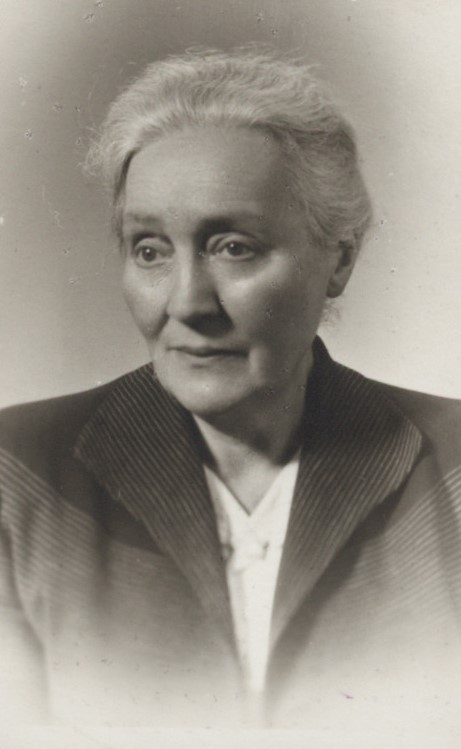
- Born: 14 August 1900; Łódź
- Died: 3 August 1988 (aged 87); Warsaw
- Citizenship: Polish
- Occupation: Historian

Academic background
- Education: University of Warsaw
- Doctoral advisor: Władysław Smoleński

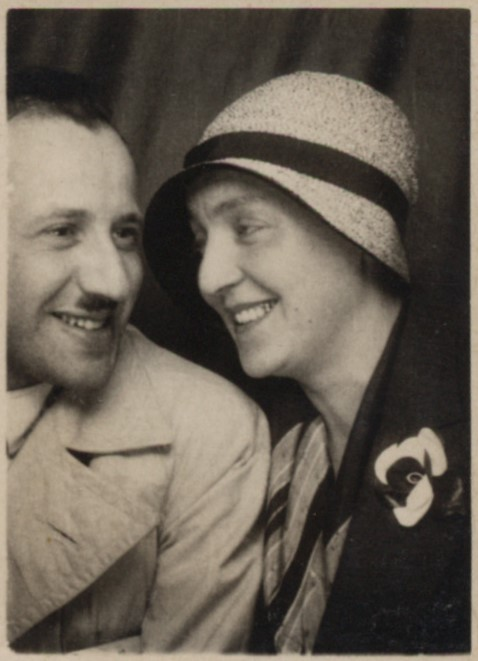
Żanna Kormanowa with her husband, Paweł Korman

Żanna Kormanowa née Zeligman or Zelikman (14 August 1900 – 3 August 1988) was a communist historian and politician, member of the Bolshevik Party, Polish Workers' Party and Polish United Workers' Party, professor at the Institute of History at the University of Warsaw.

== Biography ==
She was born in Łódź into a family of teachers. Her mother Eugenia née Jaszuńska owned a high school for girls, and her father Motel was a teacher. Her parents' siblings were connected to the traditions of the labour movement. Żanna grew up in the working-class Łódź.

She graduated from high school in Pabianice in 1918. In 1919 she enrolled at the University of Warsaw where she studied history and law. Because of her material situation she interrupted her studies twice. She also studied journalism at the Wyższa Szkoła Dziennikarska (Higher School of Journalism). In 1924 she married Paweł (Pinkus) Korman, an electrical engineer and communist. In 1926 (other source claims in 1927) she earned her doctorate based on a thesis on the Aryans, supervised by Władysław Smoleński. From 1920 to 1939, she was a secondary school teacher in Warsaw.

After the 1939 campaign, she moved to Białystok In 1941, after the Nazi invasion of Soviet Union, she fled with her husband to Stalingrad. From the summer of 1940 she had Soviet citizenship. Her husband died in December 1941.

On 8 July 1943, Wanda Wasilewska, as chairwoman of the Union of Polish Patriots, wrote a letter to the management of the Tire Industry Institute, where Kormanowa worked at the time, requesting that she be dismissed from her job as soon as possible to move to Moscow. In the second half of 1943 Kormanowa was employed at the Institute of History of the USSR Academy of Sciences as a researcher. From the second half (probably from November) of 1943, Kormanowa and Celina Bobińska participated in seminars led by Vladimir Picheta. Before that Żanna Kormanowa became a member of the Communist Party of the Soviet Union. In March 1944, her draft of a history textbook in Polish was positively opinioned by Jakub Berman. From July 1944, she was a lecturer at the Political School for officers of the Polish Army in the USSR. In the summer of 1944, she became a member of the Polish Workers' Party (PPR). In October 1944 she moved to Lublin, summoned by the Polish Committee of National Liberation. In the Provisional Government of the Republic of Poland she was director of Department V (Programs and Reform of the School System).

In January 1945 she moved to Warsaw to work in the Ministry of Education. In 1947, she received her habilitation from the University of Warsaw. In that same year she started working at the Institute of History at the University of Warsaw. From 1961 until her retirement in 1970 she was head of the Department of the History of Social Movements of University of Warsaw. She was an active member of the Polish United Workers' Party. She was a supervisor of several doctoral dissertations, including those of Anna Żarnowska and Jerzy Holzer.

== Works ==
=== Books ===
- Bracia polscy 1560–1570. Warszawa: Towarzystwo Naukowe Warszawskie. 1929.
- Materjały do bibljografji druków socjalistycznych na ziemiach polskich w latach 1866–1918. Warszawa: Instytut Gospodarstwa Społecznego. 1935.
- Odezwy „Proletarjatu” z lat 1882–1885. Warszawa: Wydawnictwo Instytutu Badania Najnowszej Historji Polski. 1936.
- Panna Stefania. Wspomnienie o Stefanii Sempołowskiej. Warszawa: Spółdzielnia Wydawnicza „Książka”. 1945.
- Joachim Lelewel. Łódź: Spółdzielnia Wydawnicza „Książka”. 1946.
- Reforma szkolnictwa w Anglii i we Francji. Przyczynek do sprawy reformy szkolnej w Polsce. Warszawa: Państwowe Zakłady Wydawnictw Szkolnych. 1946.
- Problematyka walki narodowowyzwoleńczej w latach rewolucji 1905–1907 r. na ziemiach polskich. Warszawa: Instytut Historii PAN. 1955.
- Революция 1905–1907 гг. на польских землях: попытка обобщения исторического хода революции. Moscow. 1956.
- Kwestia narodowa w rewolucji 1905–1907 roku. Warszawa: Wiedza Powszechna. 1958.
- Materiały do bibliografii polskiego ruchu robotniczego (1918–1939). Vol. 1. Warszawa: Państwowe Wydawnictwo Naukowe. 1960.
- Kontynent nieznany. Notatki australijskie. Warszawa: Książka i Wiedza. 1973.
- Ludzie i życie. Warszawa: Książka i Wiedza. 1982.
- Trzy czasopisma. Na tropach ideologii polskiego ruchu robotniczego. Warszawa: ANS. 1989. Posthumous edition.

=== Articles ===
- Plany godzin lekcyjnych i programy szkół dla dzieci polskich w ZSRR: na rok szkolny 1944-45, 1945
- Referat podsekcji historii sekcji nauk społecznych i humanistycznych I Kongresu Nauki Polskiej, Warszawa: Kwartalnik Historyczny, 1951
- Założenia naukowe i ideowe nowego programu historii dla szkoły podstawowej

== Accolades ==
- Officer's Cross of the Order of Polonia Restituta
- Medal of the 10th Anniversary of People's Poland
- Ludwik Waryński Medal
- Ludwik Waryński Prize

== Bibliography ==
- Kto jest kim w Polsce. Informator biograficzny. Edycja 2. Warszawa: Wydawnictwo Interpress. 1989. p. 579.
- Słownik biograficzny działaczy polskiego ruchu robotniczego. Vol. 3. Warszawa. 1992.
- Kancewicz, Jan (1989). "Żanna Kormanowa (1900–1988)". Z Pola Walki. 32 (2/3): 200–205.
- Kancewicz, Jan (1988). "Żanna Kormanowa (1900–1988)". Kwartalnik Historii Ruchu Zawodowego. 27 (4): 161–163.
- Siewierski, Tomasz (2012). "Komuniści i historycy. Polski ruch robotniczy w badaniach uczonych w PRL – wybrane aspekty". In Dariusz Magier (ed.). Partia komunistyczna w Polsce. Struktury – ludzie – dokumentacja. Lublin – Radzyń Podlaski. pp. 463–479.
- Stobiecki, Rafał (2007). Historiografia PRL. Ani dobra, ani mądra, ani piękna, ale skomplikowana. Warszawa. pp. 254–272.
- Stobiecki, Rafał (2014). "Żanna Kormanowa (1900–1988). Szkic do portretu wojującej marksistki". Historycy polscy wobec wyzwań XX wieku. Poznań: Wydawnictwo Nauka i Innowacje. pp. 205–234.
- Szumski, Jan (2010). "Listy Żanny Kormanowej do Władimira Piczety" (PDF). Rozprawy z Dziejów Oświaty. 47: 161–178. Archived from the original (PDF) on 12 April 2025.
