= Johannes Brun (disambiguation) =

Johannes Brun (1832–1890) was a Norwegian actor

Johannes Brun may also refer to:

- Johannes Bruhn (1898–1954), German general
- Johannes Brun (officer) (1891–1977), Norwegian businessman and military officer
- Johannes Bruyn (1750–1814), American politician

== See also ==
- Johanne Bruhn (1890–1921), Norwegian actress
- Johanne Brun (1874–1954), Danish operatic soprano
- Johannes Brüns (1903–1965), German politician
