= Christian Brunhart =

Christian Brunhart may refer to:

- Christian Brunhart (politician, born 1851) (1851–1991), Liechtenstein politician
- Christian Brunhart (politician, born 1956) (born 1956), Liechtenstein politician

== See also ==
- Brunhart
