= Helena Bobińska =

Polish writer and literary translator (1887–1968)

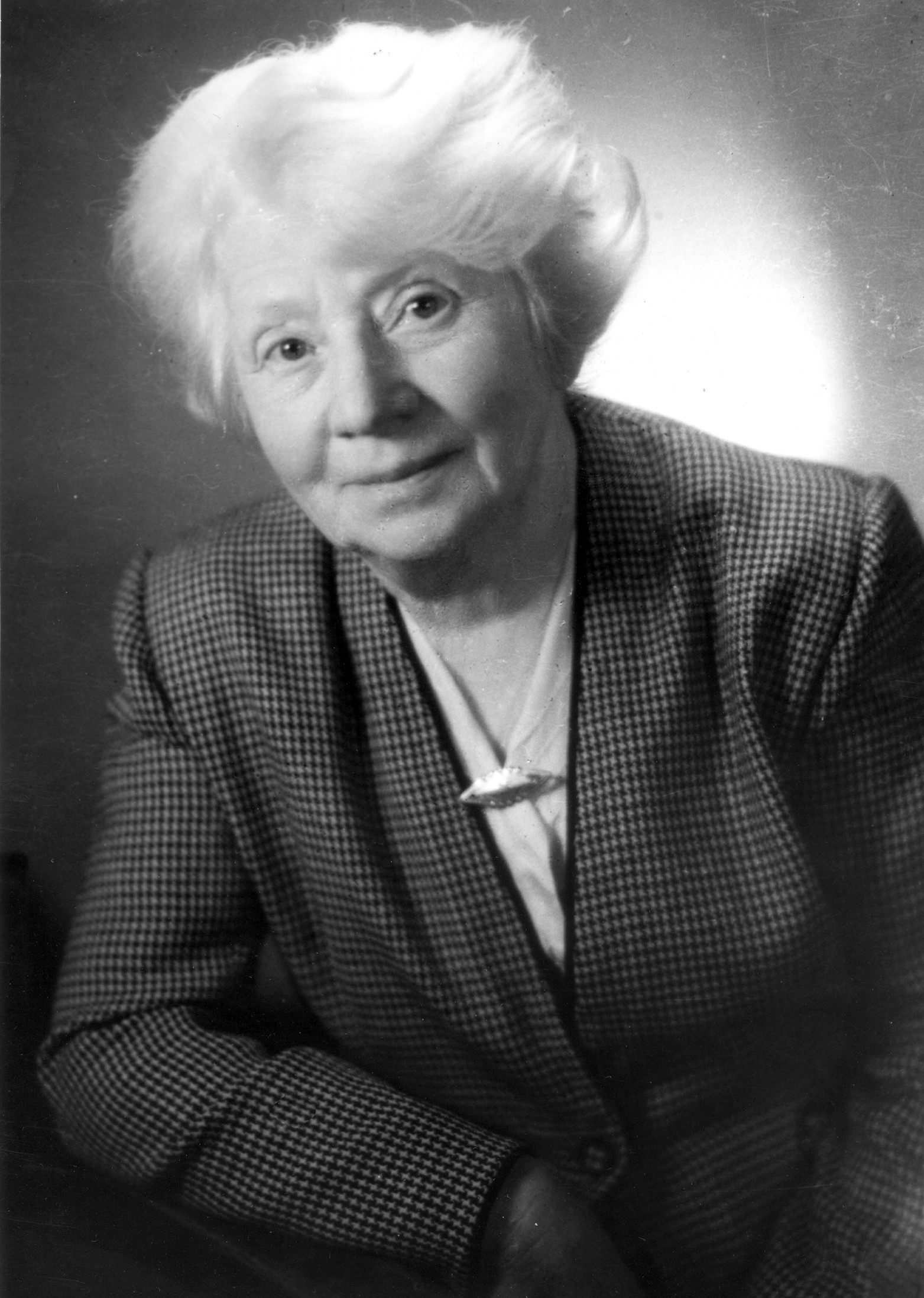
- Born: 9 May 1887; Warsaw
- Died: 9 June 1968 (aged 81); Warsaw
- Citizenship: Polish
- Occupations: Writer, translator

Helena Bobińska (9 May 1887 – 9 June 1968) was a writer and literary translator.

She was the sister of Julian Brun, aunt of Celina Budzyńska, wife of Stanisław Bobiński, mother of Celina Bobińska.

== Works ==
- O szczęśliwym chłopcu. 1918.
- Tajemnica Romka. 1926.
- Zemsta rodu Kabunauri. 1930.
- Ludzie Czerwonego Frontu. Powieść z życia kolektywników polskich na Białorusi. 1932.
- Maria Skłodowska-Curie. 1945.
- Stach Sobie-pan. 1929.
- Lipniacy. 1948.
- O wakacyjnej zabawie w sprawiedliwą republikę. 1949.
- O kotku góralu. 1949.
- Sąd pionierów. 1925. Published in Poland in 1950.
- Pionierzy. 1951.
- Spisek. 1952.
- Soso. Dziecięce i szkolne lata Stalina. 1953.
- Pamiętnik tamtych lat, cz. 1. 1963.
- O królu Słońcu i jego czterech córkach. 1971.

== Accolades ==
- Order of the Banner of Labour, 2nd class “for services rendered to the Nation and the State in the field of (...) culture and art” (22 July 1949)
- Medal of the 10th Anniversary of People's Poland (19 January 1955)
- Officer's Cross of the Order of Polonia Restituta (1958)
- Order of the Red Banner of Labour
