= Jan Peters (computer scientist) =

German computer scientist

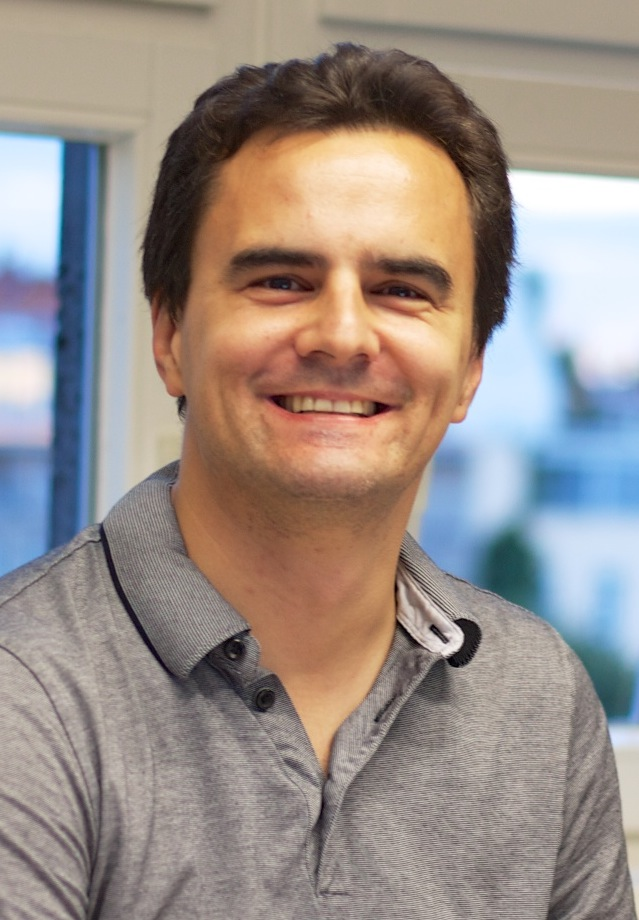
- Born: August 14, 1976 (age 50); Hamburg, West Germany
- Education: Technical University of Munich, FernUni Hagen, National University of Singapore, University of Southern California
- Scientific career
- Fields: Robot learning, Robotics, Machine learning
- Workplaces: Technische Universität Darmstadt, Max Planck Institute for Intelligent Systems, Max Planck Institute for Biological Cybernetics
- Doctoral advisor: Stefan Schaal, Firdaus Udwadia

Jan Peters (born August 14, 1976) is a German computer scientist. He is Professor of Intelligent Autonomous Systems at Department of Computer Science of the Technische Universität Darmstadt.

Peters is renowned for his research in machine learning and robotics.

== Life ==
Jan Peters graduated from the University of Hagen in 2000 with a Diplom in computer science and from Technical University of Munich in 2001 with a diploma in electrical engineering. From 2000 to 2001, he spent two semesters as visiting student at the National University of Singapore. He then studied at the University of Southern California where he earned a Master of Science degree in Computer Science and a Master of Science degree in Aerospace and Mechanical Engineering. He received his Ph.D. in computer science from the University of Southern California in 2007. During his Ph.D., he received a presidential fellowship and his Ph.D. thesis received the Dick Volz Runner-Up Award for the Best US PhD Thesis based both on thesis quality as well as post-graduation impact. From 2007 to 2021, he was head of the Robot Learning Group first at the Max Planck Institute for Biological Cybernetics (up to 2011) and later at the Max Planck Institute for Intelligent Systems (until 2021). Since 2011 he has been Head of the Intelligent Autonomous Systems Institute at the Technische Universität Darmstadt and since 2022, he is the head of the Department of Systems AI for Robot Learning at the German Research Centre for Artificial Intelligence.

In 2008, Nicholas Roy, Russ Tedrake, Jun Morimoto, and Jan Peters founded the IEEE Robotics and Automation Society's Technical Committee on Robot Learning.

== Awards ==
For his contributions, he has received the Robotics & Automation Early Career Award, the highest ranked early career award of the Institute of Electrical and Electronics Engineers, and the Young Investigator Award of the International Neural Network Society. In addition, he received an ERC Starting Grant in 2014 as well as numerous best paper awards. He was appointed Fellow of the Institute of Electrical and Electronics Engineers (IEEE) in 2019 "for contributions to robot learning of dexterous motor skills".

== Public appearances ==
Peters was a speaker at TEDx RheinMain 2018.

== Publications ==
Peters J., Vijayakumar S., Schaal S. (2005) Natural Actor-Critic. In: Gama J., Camacho R., Brazdil P.B., Jorge A.M., Torgo L. (eds) Machine Learning: ECML 2005. ECML 2005. Lecture Notes in Computer Science, vol 3720. Springer, Berlin, Heidelberg ISBN 978-3-540-29243-2, 978-3-540-31692-3
