= EUROP =

The acronym EUROP may refer to:

- European Robotics Platform, an initiative to improve the competitive situation of the European Union in the field of robotics.
- EUROP grid, a beef grading system
