= Brons (surname) =

Brons is a Dutch surname. It is probably patronymic ("son of Brun"). Brons may refer to:

- Andrew Brons (born 1947), British politician and former MEP
- Johannes Brons (1884–1964), Surinamese politician
