= List of European Union robotics projects =

This is a list of robotics projects in the European Union (EU), or sponsored by them. It includes recent and past projects sponsored under the European Commission frameworks.

== Current ==
RobotUnion was a project funded under the Horizon 2020 program in 2018 (Grant Agreement no 779967), Its main goal was to stimulate SMEs in the robotics sector to develop novel and challenging technology and systems applicable to new markets: manufacturing, civil engineering, agri-food and healthcare. From 2 Open Calls and more than 400 submitted applications, RobotUnion selected 20 robotics scale-ups with the biggest potential. These scale-ups entered a 12-month acceleration program with support from technical, business, and fundraising mentors. On top of that, each company received a cascade funding grant of up to 223K.

=== euRobotics ===
The European Robotics Coordination Action (euRobotics) was a project funded by the European Commission (EC) within the 7th Framework Programme that started on 1 January 2010 and ended on 31 December 2012. The project was designed to implement "improvements of cooperation between industry and academia" and the "Promotion of European robotics" by applying concepts under Challenge 2 of the framework: Cognitive Systems, Interaction, Robotics (FP7-ICT-244852).

=== EURON ===
The European Robotics Research Network (EURON) was founded in 2000, with funds from the Fifth Framework Programme of the European Commission (EC). The starting date was 1 December 2000, with the network's first meeting taking place in Las Palmas, Spain, on 18 and 19 January 2001. The goal of the network is to stimulate and promote research, education, and technology transfer of robotics in Europe. EURON had 230 members in 27 countries as of August 2011, with member institutes all over Europe (including "associated countries" such as Turkey and Israel). These members are all basic and applied research centers in robotics from universities, technology transfer institutes (such as the German Fraunhofer Gesellschaft), national research networks (such as the French National Centre for Scientific Research), or companies (such as ABB or KUKA).

EURON's EC funding was extended in 2004 for four years and ended in April 2008, with the project being known as EURON 2 during this period. Since then the network has continued as a community-driven organization and is at present known as EURON 3. Its major goals are to bridge the gap between the European industrial robotics developers and the mainstream industries that do not yet exploit robotics technology as well as with the general public. EURON also aims to improve the education and training of PhD students and industrial robotics engineers. EURON members were partners in euRobotics with EUROP, a Coordination Action (CA) funded by the EC to help achieve those goals. It also serves as a central contact point for the European Commission, mainly to prepare roadmaps and facilitate access to funding proposals for its members in the area of robotics research, mainly in the current Seventh Framework Programme of the European Union.

EURON has two yearly awards: one for the best PhD thesis of the previous year, and the Georges Giralt PhD Award in honor of Georges Giralt and the euRobotics Technology Transfer Award, which honors examples of effective transfer of technology from universities or research canters to companies.

=== IM-CLeVeR ===
The IM-CLeVeR project, short for 'Intrinsically Motivated Cumulative Learning Versatile Robots', started in 2009 as a 4-year research project to investigate robot design methodology for skills acquisition. Its objectives are: "to develop a new methodology for designing robot controllers that can: cumulatively learn new efficient skills through autonomous development based on intrinsic motivations, and reuse such skills for accomplishing multiple, complex, and externally-assigned tasks."

This project aims to solve also combine the work of a highly interdisciplinary consortium involving neuroscientists, psychologists, roboticists, and machine-learning researchers.

In October 2012 an outreach video showing the ongoing research on the iCub humanoid robot platform was published on the researcher's webpage.

== Past ==
=== LEURRE ===
- LEURRE was a project involved with building and controlling mixed societies composed of animals and artificial agents. The project was sponsored by the Future and Emerging Technologies program of the European Community (IST-2001-35506). The LEURRE project ran from 1 September 2002 to 31 August 2005 and showed for the first time that social interaction between animals and robots allows for the creation of non-natural behaviors in animal society.

LEURRE's main goals are: to study, experimentally and theoretically, the global behaviors of mixed societies composed of animals and artificial agents; to develop models and tools for such mixed societies; to provide a general methodology towards the control of mixed societies; and to validate the concepts by applying this methodology to the control of experiments in the laboratory and in agriculture.

The LEURRE project involved interdisciplinary collaboration between engineers and biologists, and lead to the development of a suite of tools:

- The Insbot, a robot that is able to integrate into a cockroach society when impregnated with cockroach pheromones
- The software package Swistrack is open-source software that is able to analyze the trajectories of cockroaches and robots, and hence allows to analyzing their individual behavior as well the spatio temporal patterns appearing on a collective level

=== EUROP ===
The European Robotics Platform (EUROP) is one of several European Technology Platforms (ETP) to improve the competitive situation of the European Union. EUROP is an industry-driven framework for the main stakeholders in robotics to strengthen Europe's competitiveness in robotics R&D, as well as global markets, and to improve quality of life. To this aim, EUROP has developed a joint European Strategic Research Agenda (SRA), which would help focus research initiatives and innovative activities toward maximum impact. The SRA was published in July 2009.

EUROP's roots go back to October 2004, when leading European robotics organizations started to formulate the need for a consolidated approach to European robotics, which led to the constitution of EUROP as an ETP in October 2005. From 2010 to 2012, The European Robotics Coordination Action (euRobotics CA), an EU project within the Seventh Framework Programme of the Information and Communication Technology, supported EUROP.
