= Auke Ijspeert =

Swiss-Dutch roboticist and neuroscientist

Professor Auke Jan Ijspeert
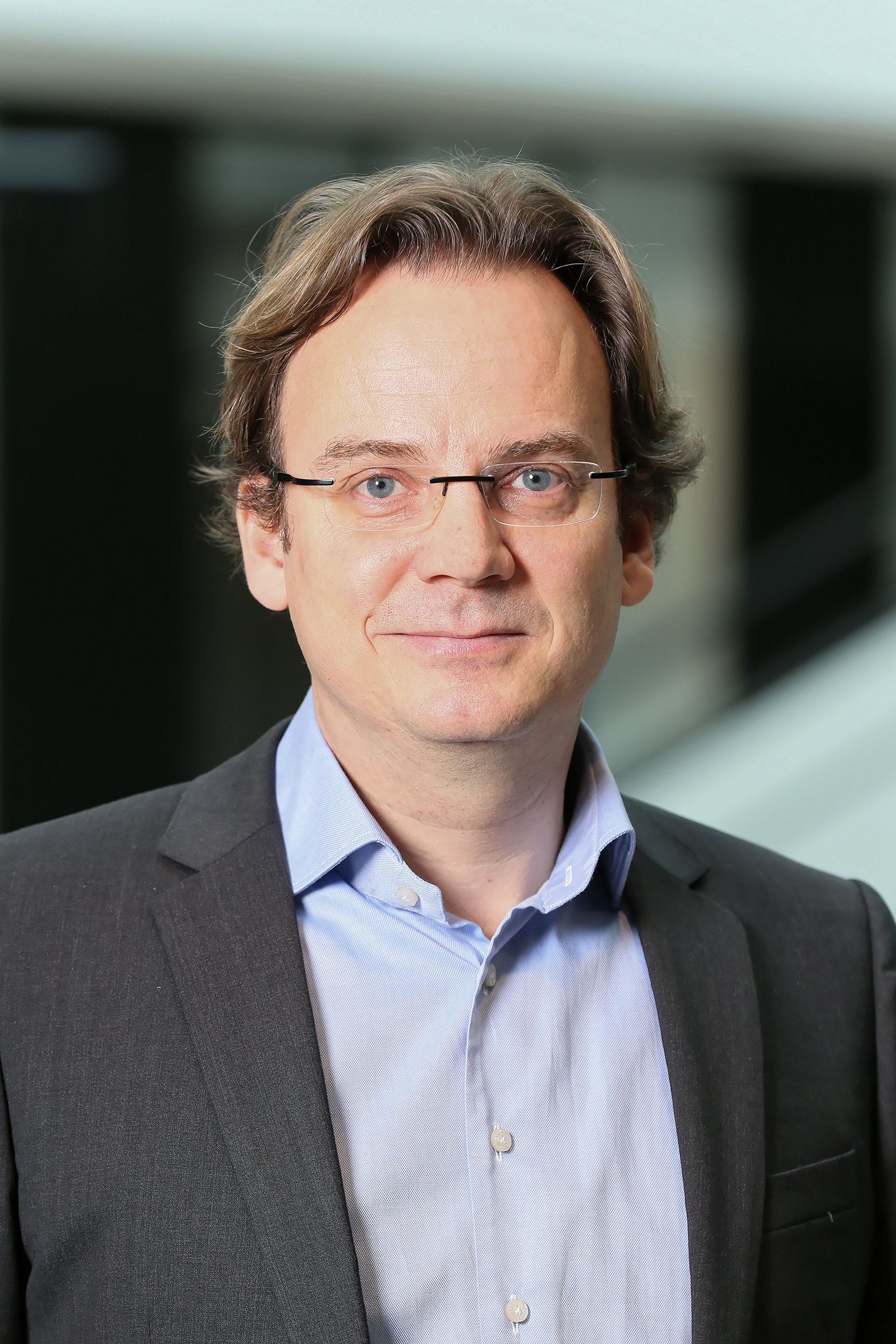
- Auke Ijspeert in 2020
- Born: 1971 (age 54–55); Geneva, Switzerland

Academic background
- Education: Physics
- Alma mater: École Polytechnique Fédérale de Lausanne; University of Edinburgh
- Thesis: Design of artificial neural oscillatory circuits for the control of lamprey- and salamander-like locomotion using evolutionary algorithms (1999)
- Doctoral advisor: John Hallam; David Willshaw
- Other advisors: Michael A. Arbib; Stefan Schaal; Jean-Daniel Nicoud; Luca Maria Gambardella

Academic work
- Discipline: Neuroscience
- Sub-discipline: Robotics
- Institutions: École Polytechnique Fédérale de Lausanne (EPFL)
- Main interests: Biorobotics; Computational neuroscience Locomotion; Central pattern generators
- Website: https://www.epfl.ch/labs/biorob/

Auke Jan Ijspeert (born 1971 in Geneva) is a Swiss-Dutch roboticist and neuroscientist. He is a professor of biorobotics in the Institute of Bioengineering at EPFL, École Polytechnique Fédérale de Lausanne, and the head of the Biorobotics Laboratory at the School of Engineering.

== Career ==
He has studied physics at EPFL and a degree of an "Ingénieur physicien" (equivalent to Master's degree) in 1995. He joined John Hallam and David Willshaw at the University of Edinburgh as a doctoral student, and in 1999 graduated with a PhD in artificial intelligence on the "Design of artificial neural oscillatory circuits for the control of lamprey- and salamander-like locomotion using evolutionary algorithms". He worked as a postdoctoral researcher with Michael A. Arbib and Stefan Schaal at University of Southern California (USC), and then at EPFL with Jean-Daniel Nicoud and with Luca Maria Gambardella (Dalle Molle Institute for Artificial Intelligence Research - IDSIA).

In 2001, he became a research assistant professor at the Department of Computer Science of the University of Southern California, and an external collaborator at ATR (Advanced Telecommunications Research institute) in Japan. From 2003 to 2017, he was an adjunct faculty Department of Computer Science of the University of Southern California. In 2002, he received Swiss National Science Foundation assistant professorship at the School of Computer and Communication Sciences of EPFL. In 2009, he was named associate professor at EPFL's School of Engineering, and in 2016 he was promoted as full professor. He leads the Biorobotics Laboratory at the School of Engineering.

== Research ==
The Ijspeert group's transdisciplinary research is situated at the intersection of robotics, computational neuroscience, nonlinear dynamical systems, and applied machine learning. Employing numerical simulations and robots, they aim at a better understanding of animal locomotion and movement control, and by taking inspiration in nature, they design new types of robots and locomotion controllers. Their research was featured in public presentations at TED Global and World.minds conferences.

Their research is focused on computational aspects of locomotion control, sensorimotor coordination, and learning in animals and in robots. Furthermore, their research focuses also on rehabilitation robotics, such as exoskeletons, and in locomotion restoration. Their interests extent to research projects in areas such as neuromechanical simulations of locomotion and movement control; systems of coupled nonlinear oscillators for locomotion control; design and control of amphibious, legged, and reconfigurable robots; and, control of humanoid robots, and of exoskeletons.

The research of Ijspeert's group has been featured in news outlets such as IEEE Spectrum, New Scientist, Tech Crunch, Le Temps, Nature, SwissInfo, The Washington Post, Cosmos, CNN, SRF, Tages-Anzeiger, The Mirror, and Der Standard.

== Distinctions ==
Ijspeert is an IEEE Fellow. He is a member of the board of reviewing editors of Science Magazine, and an associate editor of Soft Robotics, IEEE Transactions on Medical Robotics and Bionics, and for the International Journal of Humanoid Robotics. He has been an associate editor for the IEEE Transactions on Robotics (2009-2013) and a guest editor for the Proceedings of IEEE, IEEE Transactions on Biomedical Engineering, Autonomous Robots, IEEE Robotics and Automation Magazine, and Biological Cybernetics.

He is a recipient of the Young Professorship Award (2002), the Young Researcher Scholarship (1999), and the Young Researcher Scholarship (1995) all awarded from the Swiss National Science Foundation . He also received the Marie Curie Scholarship from the European Commission (1997).

== Public involvements ==
Ijspeert is also involved in his local church, the parish of Ecublens-St-Sulpice that is part of the Evangelical Reformed Church of the Canton of Vaud, and he is member of its parish council since 2019.

== Selected works ==
- Ryczko, Dimitri; Simon, András; Ijspeert, Auke Jan (2020). "Walking with Salamanders: From Molecules to Biorobotics". Trends in Neurosciences. 43 (11): 916–930. doi:10.1016/j.tins.2020.08.006. PMID 33010947. S2CID 222070688.
- Ijspeert, Auke J. (2020). "Amphibious and Sprawling Locomotion: From Biology to Robotics and Back". Annual Review of Control, Robotics, and Autonomous Systems. 3: 173–193. doi:10.1146/annurev-control-091919-095731. S2CID 214494132.
- Nyakatura, John A.; Melo, Kamilo; Horvat, Tomislav; Karakasiliotis, Kostas; Allen, Vivian R.; Andikfar, Amir; Andrada, Emanuel; Arnold, Patrick; Lauströer, Jonas; Hutchinson, John R.; Fischer, Martin S.; Ijspeert, Auke J. (2019). "Reverse-engineering the locomotion of a stem amniote" (PDF). Nature. 565 (7739): 351–355. Bibcode:2019Natur.565..351N. doi:10.1038/s41586-018-0851-2. PMID 30651613. S2CID 58014495.
- Hauser, S.; Mutlu, M.; Léziart, P.-A.; Khodr, H.; Bernardino, A.; Ijspeert, A.J. (2020). "Roombots extended: Challenges in the next generation of self-reconfigurable modular robots and their application in adaptive and assistive furniture". Robotics and Autonomous Systems. 127 103467. doi:10.1016/j.robot.2020.103467. S2CID 213307979.
- Ijspeert, A. J. (2014). "Biorobotics: Using robots to emulate and investigate agile locomotion". Science. 346 (6206): 196–203. Bibcode:2014Sci...346..196I. doi:10.1126/science.1254486. PMID 25301621. S2CID 42734749.
- Ijspeert, Auke Jan; Nakanishi, Jun; Hoffmann, Heiko; Pastor, Peter; Schaal, Stefan (2013). "Dynamical Movement Primitives: Learning Attractor Models for Motor Behaviors" (PDF). Neural Computation. 25 (2): 328–373. Bibcode:2013NeCom..25..328I. doi:10.1162/NECO_a_00393. hdl:20.500.11820/3a347438-6b51-4f11-ba7a-5465173736f8. PMID 23148415. S2CID 2431443.
- Spröwitz, Alexander; Tuleu, Alexandre; Vespignani, Massimo; Ajallooeian, Mostafa; Badri, Emilie; Ijspeert, Auke Jan (2013). "Towards dynamic trot gait locomotion: Design, control, and experiments with Cheetah-cub, a compliant quadruped robot" (PDF). The International Journal of Robotics Research. 32 (8): 932–950. doi:10.1177/0278364913489205. S2CID 90770.
- Ijspeert, Auke Jan (2008). "Central pattern generators for locomotion control in animals and robots: A review" (PDF). Neural Networks. 21 (4): 642–653. Bibcode:2008NN.....21..642I. doi:10.1016/j.neunet.2008.03.014. PMID 18555958.
- Ijspeert, A. J.; Crespi, A.; Ryczko, D.; Cabelguen, J.-M. (2007). "From Swimming to Walking with a Salamander Robot Driven by a Spinal Cord Model". Science. 315 (5817): 1416–1420. Bibcode:2007Sci...315.1416I. doi:10.1126/science.1138353. PMID 17347441. S2CID 3193002.
