= Brun =

Brun may refer to:

== People ==
- Brun (surname)
- Brun (given name)
- Brun I of Saxony (c. 830/840–880)
- Brun of Querfurt (c. 974–1009), missionary archbishop and martyr
- Brun I, Count of Brunswick (c. 975–c. 1010)

== Places ==
- Brun, former name of Akner, Syunik, Armenia, a village
- Brun, Pakistan, village in Lower Chitral District, Pakistan
- Mont Brun, a mountain in Switzerland
- River Brun, a river in eastern Lancashire, England

== Other ==
- Brun (grape), another name for the French wine grape Téoulier
- Brun Motorsport, a Swiss sports car team

== See also ==
- Bruno (disambiguation)
- Bruin (disambiguation)
- Bruun
- Brunskill
