= Stanisław Bobiński =

Soviet military commander and politician (1882–1937)

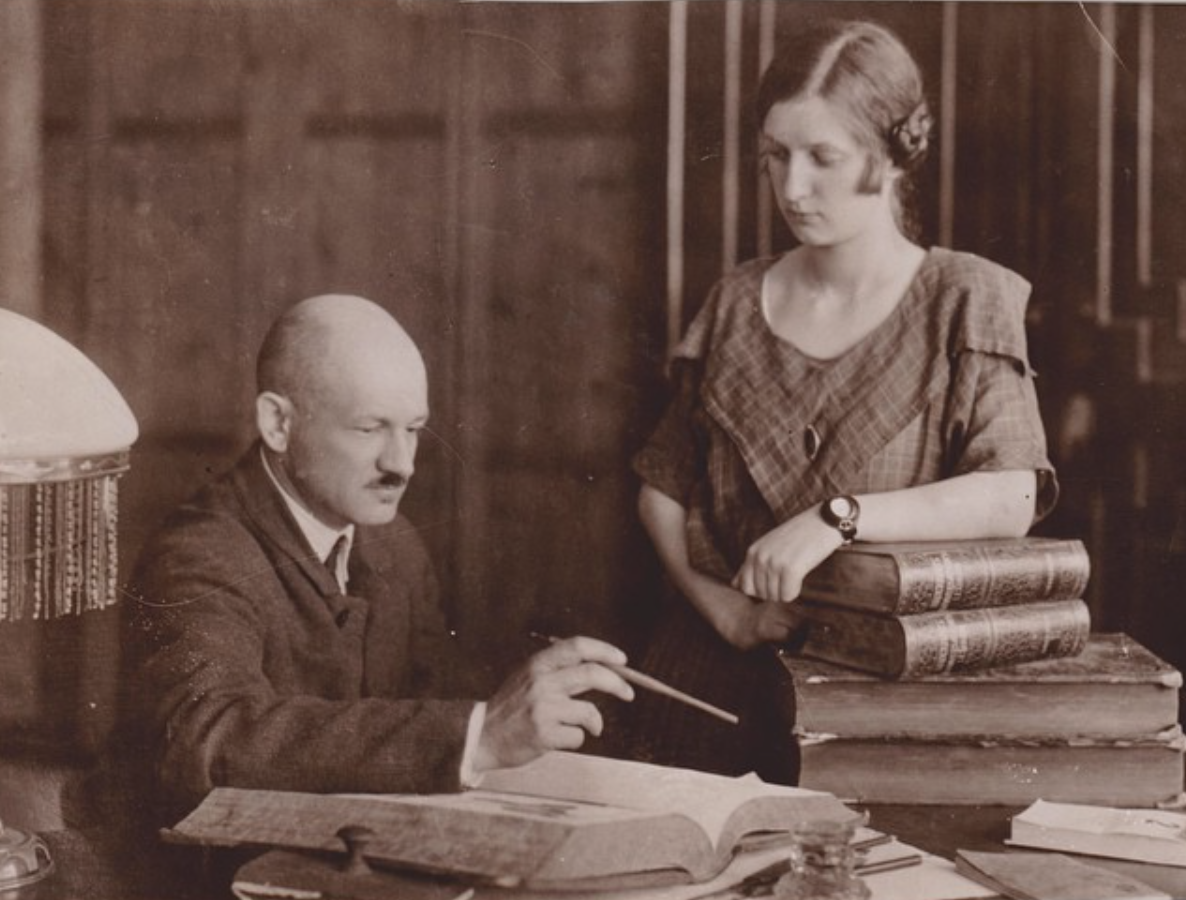
Stanisław Bobiński and his wife Jadwiga in 1925

Stanisław Feliks Bobiński (Polish pronunciation: [staˈɲiswaf bɔˈbiɲskʲi]; Russian: Станислав Янович Бобинский; 20 November 1882 – 20 September 1937) was a Soviet communist politician, journalist and military commander of Polish origin.

== Early years ==
He was born on 20 November 1882 in Warsaw to a gentry family of an insurance official Jan Bobiński and his wife Stanisława (née Tołwińska). He began his studies in Warsaw, then graduated from the faculty of philosophy of the Jagiellonian University of Kraków. He continued his studies at the Academy of Forestry in Dresden, where he received his diploma in 1911.

In 1913 he returned to Warsaw and became a member of the committee of the SDKPiL party. Evacuated from Warsaw in 1915, he moved to Moscow.

== Revolution and war ==
In 1917 he became an active member of the Bolshevik Party. He was one of the directors of the Polish-language Trybuna newspaper published in revolutionary Moscow and a notable promoter of the communist movement among the Polish expatriates in Russia.

At the end of 1917, he was elected to the Constituent Assembly from the Smolensk and Minsk districts on list No. 7 (Bolsheviks). He participated in the first and last meeting of the Assembly on 5 January 1918.

A representative of the SDKPiL at the Brest peace talks, on 7 February (25 January) 1918 he announced the "Declaration of the representatives of the working people of Poland", calling for "the elimination of police barriers between the three parts of one country" and "the immediate withdrawal of the occupying troops and the cleansing of Poland from all government bodies established by occupation authorities". He was a delegate to the VII Congress of the RSDLP(b) with an advisory vote.

After the end of World War I in Russia he started to organize the Red Regiment of Revolutionary Warsaw, a military unit of the Red Army composed primarily of Poles. With time the regiment grew to become the core of the Western Rifle Division, later renamed to the Soviet 52nd Rifle Division, of which Bobiński was a commissar. During the Soviet offensive on Warsaw during the Polish–Soviet War, Bobiński became the secretary of propaganda in a shadow government formed by the Communist Party of Poland (the Provisional Polish Revolutionary Committee), headed by Julian Marchlewski and Felix Dzerzhinsky. During this time he became chairman of the Central Committee of the trade union of agricultural workers of Lithuania and Belarus, as well as a member of the All-Russian Central Executive Committee (1919–1920). In 1920, during the Polish–Soviet war, he was a member for agriculture of the Provisional Polish Revolutionary Committee. However, the Soviet defeat in the battle of Warsaw brought this career to an end.

== Soviet career ==
He continued his career as a Soviet communist politician and at various times he was a delegate to the Comintern and Communist Party General Committee. He was a member of the III Congress of the Comintern (June–July 1921). In 1922–1924, he became a professor of philosophy and rector of the Gorky Ural University in Yekaterinburg, and beginning in 1925 was a member of the Polish Bureau (Polburo) in the Central Committee of the All-Union Communist Party of Bolsheviks.

In 1926–1928 he worked as a researcher at the Communist Academy in Moscow. In addition, he was an activist of the Communist Party of Poland (KPP): in particular, in 1921 and 1925–1926 he was a member of the representation of the Central Committee of the KPP in the executive committee of the Comintern. He was also the director of the Moscow Polytechnic Institute. In 1929 he was demoted from most his party posts and became a head of a technical museum in Moscow.

Bobiński's first wife was the writer Helena Brunów (sister of communist Julian Brun), with whom he had at least one daughter. His second wife was Jadwiga Siekierska, a communist art theorist.

== Execution and rehabilitation ==
He was arrested in the evening of 15 June 1937 by the NKVD during the Great Purge on charges of participating in the counter-revolutionary organization Polish Military Organisation ("POW"), conducting espionage activities in the USSR on behalf of Polish intelligence, having knowledge of other members' terrorist plans, and Luxemburgism.

He was sentenced to death by the Military Collegium of the Supreme Court of the USSR. The court session lasted twenty minutes and execution took place on 20 September 1937. Cremated in the crematorium at the Don Cemetery, the ashes were buried anonymously.

He was rehabilitated by the Soviet government in 1955.
