= Anna Żarnowska =

Polish historian

Anna Maria Żarnowska
- Born: Anna Maria Rozwadowska; 28 June 1931; Warsaw, Poland
- Died: 9 June 2007 (aged 75); Warsaw, Poland
- Burial place: Bródno cemetery
- Education: University of Warsaw
- Occupation: Historian
- Known for: Woman and... (book series)
- Spouse: Janusz Żarnowski

Anna Maria Żarnowska (née Rozwadowska; 28 June 1931 – 9 June 2007, in Warsaw) was a Polish historian and researcher of the Polish labour movement and women's history at the University of Warsaw. She was invested with the Officer's Cross of the Order of Polish Revival in 2003.

== Life and work ==
She obtained her master's degree at the University of Warsaw in 1954. She obtained her doctoral degree on 27 November 1962 on the basis of her dissertation entitled The formation of the leftist trend and the split in the PPS (1904–1906), written under the direction of Żanna Kormanowa. Her habilitation was earned in 1973. From 1985 she held the academic title of associate professor, and from 1995 on, she was a full professor and then professor-emeritus at the University of Warsaw.

=== Career ===
Żarnowska worked in the Department of Party History. From 1966, she was chairman of the Women's History Committee at the Polish Committee of Historical Sciences. From 1986, she headed the Group / Department of Social History of Poland in the 19th and 20th centuries on a comparative basis. From 1989, she was head of the research project "Socio-cultural history of women in Poland in the 19th and 20th centuries."

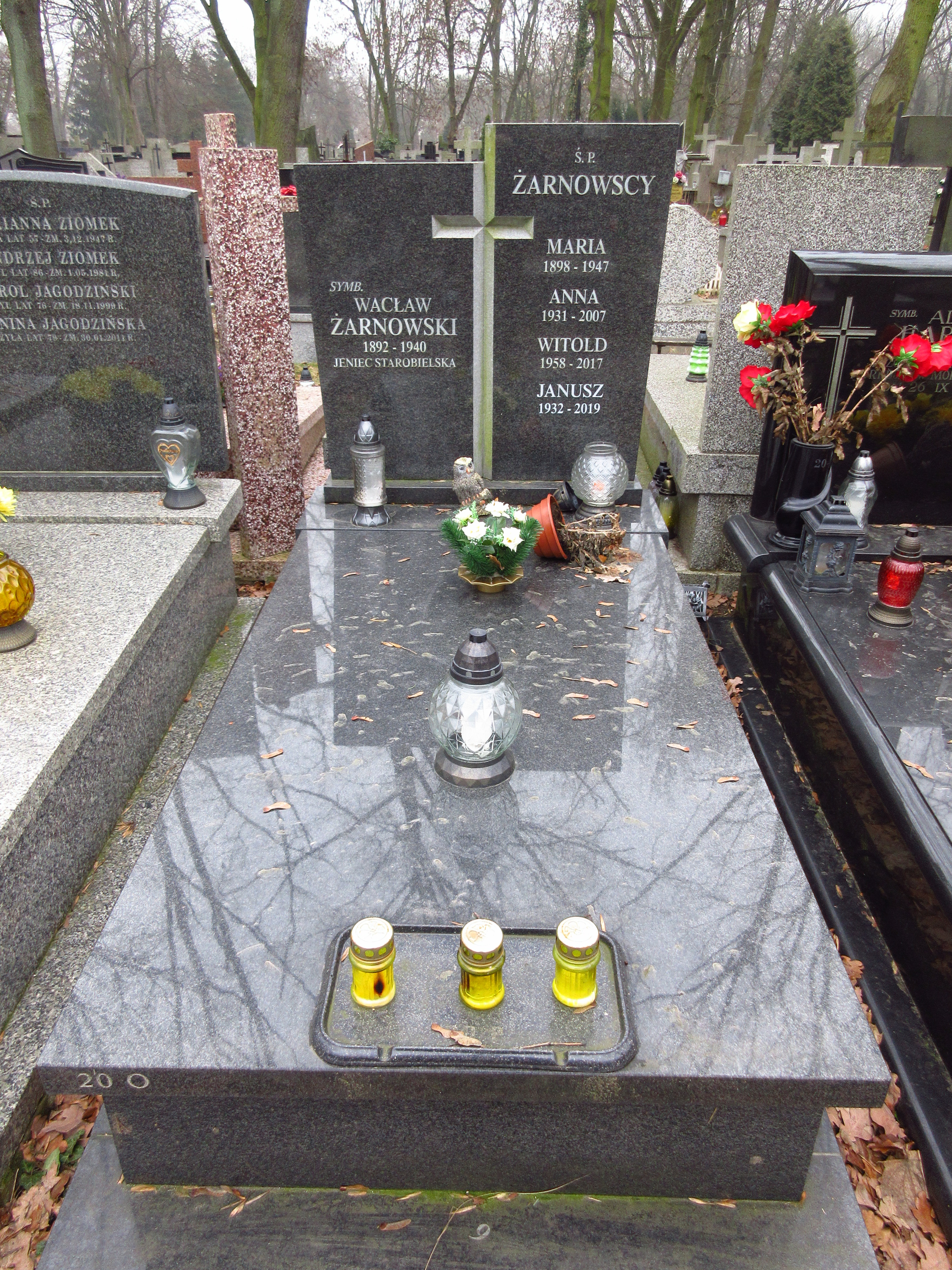
Gravesite of Anna and Janusz.

One of her most important projects was done with Andrzej Szwarc. Żarnowska was the scientific editor for a series of volumes entitled, A woman and ...

Other positions she held were: member of the Scientific Council of the International Conference of Labor and Social History (ITH) in Vienna since 1990 and council vice-president since 1997, and representative of the University of Warsaw at ITH since 1976.

In 2003, she was decorated with the Officer's Cross of the Order of Polonia Restituta.

=== Personal life ===
Her husband was also a professor of history, Janusz Żarnowski.

She was buried on June 15 at the Bródno cemetery in Warsaw (section 20P-5-13).

=== Students ===
Her students included Irena Kępa, Jarosław Paskudzki, Andrzej Stawarz, Andrzej Tusiński, Adrian Zandberg.

== Selected publications ==
- The genesis of the split in the Polish Socialist Party (1904–1906) (1965)
- The Working Class of the Kingdom of Poland (1870–1914) (1974)
- Workers of Warsaw at the turn of the 19th and 20th centuries (1985)
- Around the Tradition of Workers' Culture in Poland (before 1939) (1986, scientific editor and co-author)
- The series: Woman and ...
  - volume I: Woman and society in the Polish lands in the nineteenth century (1990);
  - volume II: Woman and Education in the Polish Territories in the 19th and 20th Centuries, parts 1-2 (1992);
  - volume III: Woman and the world of politics, parts 1-2 [19th and 20th centuries] (1994–1996);
  - volume IV: Woman and culture - among the creators of intellectual and artistic culture (19th-20th century) (1996);
  - volume V: Woman and the culture of everyday life. 19th and 20th century (1997);
  - volume VI: Woman and work in the nineteenth and twentieth centuries (2000);
  - volume VII: Woman and the culture of free time (19th and 20th centuries) (2001);
  - volume VIII: Woman and marriage. 19th-20th century (2004).
- Religion and Politics: Polish Workers c. 1900, [in:] "Social History" 1991, pp. 299–316
- Equal rights and unequal opportunities - women in interwar Poland (2000, scientific editor and co-author)
- Workers, Women and Social Change in Poland, 1870–1939, Ashgate 2004. Baldoncelli
