= Władysław Smoleński =

Polish historian, author, and professor

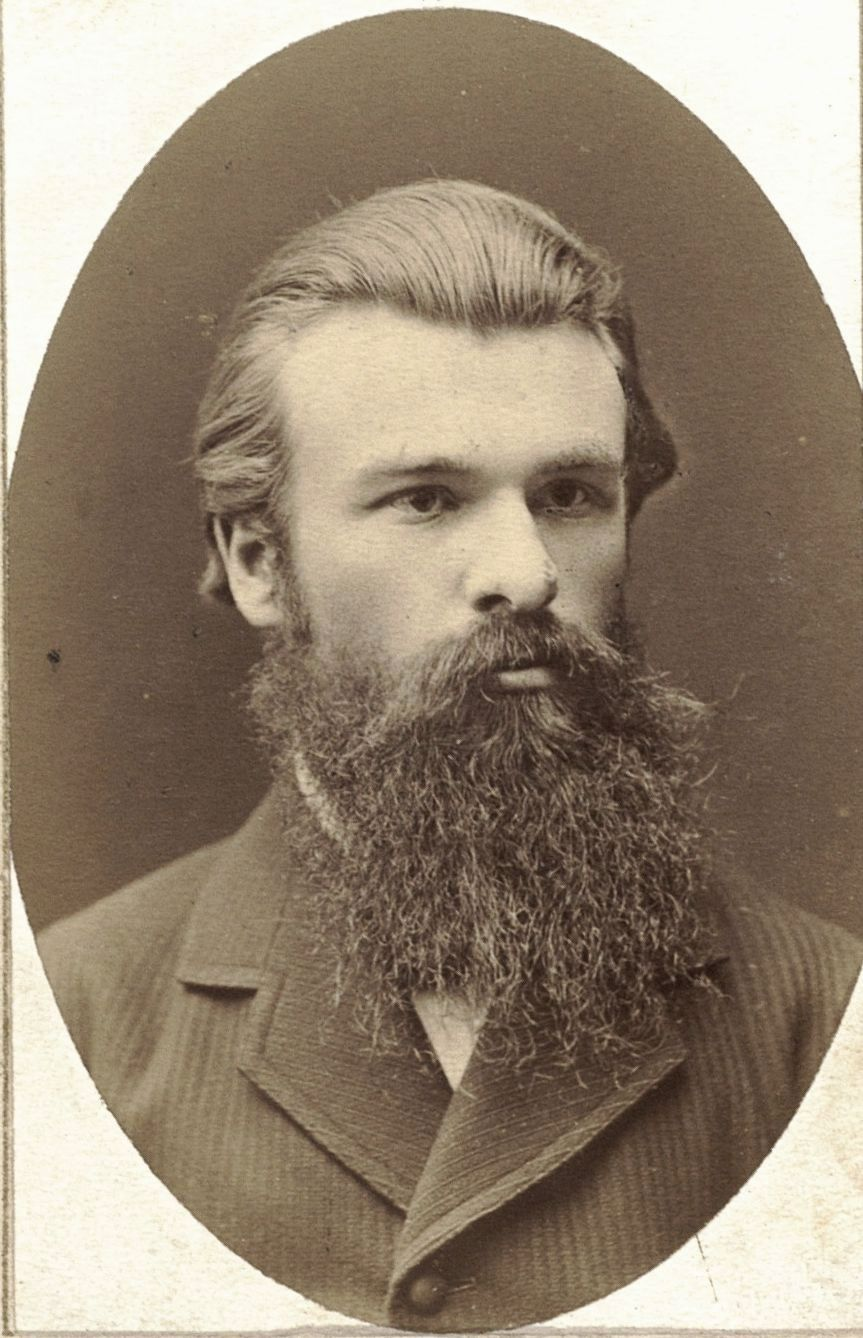
Władysław Smoleński

Władysław Smoleński (1851–1926) was a Polish historian, author of many books and articles, and a professor of the Warsaw University.

Żanna Kormanowa was among his doctoral students.
