= Marek Zgórniak =

Polish art historian

- Occupation: Art historian

Academic background
- Education: Jagiellonian University
- Doctoral advisor: Piotr Krakowski

Marek Zgórniak is an art historian, professor at the Jagiellonian University.

== Biography ==
Son of Marian Zgórniak. In 1983 he graduated in art history from the Jagiellonian University. In 1992 he obtained doctorate upon dissertation Walka o kolor. Weneckie Cinquecento we francuskim malarstwie i krytyce artystycznej XIX wieku, supervised by Piotr Krakowski. In 1999 he obtained habilitation.

His research interests include architecture of the 19th and early 20th centuries (Neo-Renaissance), European painting of the 19th and early 20th centuries (mainly French painting before Impressionism, art in Paris in the 19th century), historicism and historical painting (Jan Matejko) and art criticism in the 19th century. He published four books and more than ninety articles. In the Wielka Encyklopedia PWN he published entries on French art (vol. 3–7) and on Polish architecture (vol. 8, 11, 14). He supervised four doctoral dissertations.

He became a member of the Art History Commission of the Polish Academy of Arts and Sciences and a member of the Scientific Council of the Institute of Art History of the Jagiellonian University.

== Books ==
- Wokół neorenesansu w architekturze XIX wieku. Kraków. 1987. Second edition, revised and corrected, Kraków 2013. ISBN 978-83-924287-2-5.
- Pędzel Tycjana. Francuscy malarze i krytycy XIX wieku wobec weneckiego Cinquecenta. Kraków. 1995.
- Matejko w Paryżu. Opinie krytyków francuskich z lat 1865–1870. Kraków. 1998.
- Jan Matejko, 1838–1893. Kalendarium życia i twórczości. Kraków. 2004.

=== Editions ===
- Artyści i Kraków: studia ofiarowane Tomaszowi Gryglewiczowi. Kraków. 2022. ISBN 978-83-935675-5-3. Co-edited with Jan Ostrowski, Andrzej Szczerski and Marek Walczak.
