= Emma Brunskill =

American computer scientist

- Born: Emma Patricia Brunskill
- Citizenship: American
- Education: University of Washington (BS); Magdalen College, Oxford (MSc); Massachusetts Institute of Technology (PhD)
- Known for: Reinforcement learning theory AI for education AI for healthcare
- Scientific career
- Fields: Computer science, machine learning, human–computer interaction, reinforcement learning
- Workplaces: Stanford University; Stanford Graduate School of Education; Carnegie Mellon University; University of California, Berkeley
- Thesis: Compact parametric models for efficient sequential decision making in high-dimensional, uncertain domains (2009)
- Doctoral advisor: Nicholas Roy

Emma Patricia Brunskill is an American computer scientist. Her research combines machine learning with human–computer interaction by studying the effects of AI systems in human-centered applications including educational software and healthcare, and the theory of reinforcement learning in situations where mistakes impose high risks or costs. She is an associate professor of computer science at Stanford University, where she also holds a courtesy appointment in the Stanford Graduate School of Education and is an affiliate of the King Center on Global Development.

== Education and career ==
Brunskill grew up in Seattle and Edmonds, Washington, and entered the University of Washington at age 15. She graduated magna cum laude in 2000, with a bachelor's degree in computer engineering and physics. A Rhodes Scholarship took her to Magdalen College, Oxford in England, where she received a master's degree in neuroscience in 2002. After a summer working in Rwanda, she became a graduate student of computer science at the Massachusetts Institute of Technology, where she completed her Ph.D. in 2009. Her doctoral dissertation, Compact parametric models for efficient sequential decision making in high-dimensional, uncertain domains, was supervised by Nicholas Roy.

After working as an NSF Postdoctoral Research Fellow at the University of California, Berkeley, she joined Carnegie Mellon University (CMU) in 2011 as an assistant professor of computer science. She moved from CMU to Stanford University in 2017.

== Recognition ==
Brunskill was a 2014 recipient of the National Science Foundation CAREER Award and a 2015 recipient of the Office of Naval Research Young Investigator Award. She was one of two alumni of the University of Washington's Paul G. Allen School of Computer Science and Engineering to be honored in 2020 by the school's Alumni Impact Awards.

She was elected as a Fellow of the Association for the Advancement of Artificial Intelligence in 2025, "for significant contributions to the field of reinforcement learning, and applications for societal benefit, in particular AI for education".
