= Vladimir Picheta =

Belarusian historian (1878–1947)

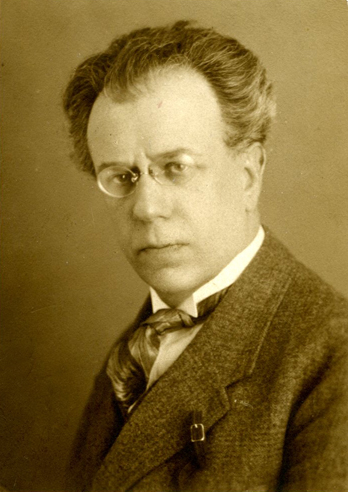
Picheta in 1920

Vladimir Ivanovich Picheta (Russian: Владимир Иванович Пичета; Belarusian: Уладзімір Іванавіч Пічэта; 21 October 1878, Poltava – 23 June 1947, Moscow) was a Belarusian and Soviet historian, first rector of the Belarusian State University (July 1921 – October 1929), academician of the Academy of Sciences of the BSSR since 1928, Honorary Professor of the BSSR (1926), Corresponding Member of the Academy of Sciences of the Soviet Union since 1939, Academician of the Academy of Sciences of the Soviet Union since 1946.

== Biography ==
Picheta was born in Poltava. His father, Ivan (Jovan) Khristoforovich (1844–1920), a Serb by nationality, a native of the city of Mostar in Bosnia and Herzegovina (then under the Ottoman Empire), was the rector of the Vitebsk Theological Seminary and then Poltava Theological Seminary. The scientist's mother, Maria Grigorievna Grigorenko, of Ukrainian origin, was the daughter of a Kyiv official of the Treasury Chamber.

Picheta graduated from the Poltava Gymnasium in 1897, and 1901 – from the History and Philology Department of Moscow University. Vasily Klyuchevsky was the scientific supervisor of his diploma (then called candidate) work "Yuri Krizhanich on the Moscow State".

After graduation, he taught at secondary schools in Moscow, and from 1902 he worked in Ukraine (Korostyshev, Yekaterinoslav). In September 1905, Picheta returned to Moscow, where he taught first at secondary educational institutions, and from 1906 at higher educational institutions, giving lectures to workers. In 1909, the young scientist passed his master's exam, and in 1910 he was approved as a privat-docent of Moscow University. In February 1911, together with a group of professors and assistant professors, he left the university in protest against the activities of the Minister of Public Education L.A. Kasso. He taught at the Higher Courses for Women and at the Practical Academy of Commercial Sciences. At the end of 1917, Picheta became a teacher at Moscow State University, and after the merger in June 1918 of the Higher Courses for Women, where he lectured, with the university, he became a professor at the 2nd Moscow State University. In 1918, Vladimir Ivanovich defended his dissertation for a master's degree in Russian history on the first volume of the monograph “Agrarian reform of Sigismund-Augustus in the Lithuanian-Russian state”.

After the opening of the university in Minsk – Picheta was its rector from the initial beginning in 1921 until 1929.

In 1930 he was arrested for an "academic case" and accused of great-power chauvinism, Belarusian bourgeois nationalism, and pro-Western orientation. Many months stay in the House of Pre-trial Detention in Leningrad in 1930–1931. seriously undermined the physical and moral health of the scientist. In August 1931, Picheta was exiled to Vyatka, where he worked as rationing and timekeeper in a public catering cooperative. In September 1934, Picheta was transferred to Voronezh, where he worked as a professor at the Voronezh Pedagogical Institute and taught a course in the history of the USSR.

One of the versions of Picheta's release from exile is associated with the name of Edvard Beneš, the Minister of Foreign Affairs of Czechoslovakia (in the future, the President of Czechoslovakia). According to the memoirs of A.I. Picheta (the second wife of Vladimir Ivanovich), in June 1934 Beneš visited Moscow to establish diplomatic relations with the Soviet Union. During a meeting with Stalin, to the question of the head of the government of the Soviet Union, what the minister would like to see in the Union, with whom to talk, Beneš replied: “I would like to meet with the famous Slavic scholar, Professor Picheta, otherwise in Czechoslovakia, there are rumors that he is arrested and he is not even alive." By order of Stalin, Picheta was urgently taken from Vyatka, presented with a fake certificate of a corresponding member of the Academy of Sciences of the Soviet Union, and presented to Beneš. After returning to Prague, Beneš hosted a press conference for Czechoslovakia and foreign journalists. When asked about his meetings in the Soviet Union, he said that he had met with a famous scientist, Slavic scholar, Professor Vladimir Picheta. “Rumors of his arrest and death, fortunately, have not been confirmed,” Beneš said.

The historian Yury F. Ivanov, without questioning the possibility of Beneš' interference, based on archival materials, suggested that in the summer of 1934 the Minister of Foreign Affairs of Czechoslovakia was not in the USSR, the visit took place a year later, when he visited Moscow to exchange ratifications earlier the concluded agreement on mutual assistance. This means that Picheta's release from exile took place no earlier than three months before the end of the term set for the scientist by the OGPU Collegium.

Either thanks to the intervention of Benes or as a result of Picheta's petition to the CEC for early release, his case was reviewed and on April 26, 1935, the scientist was released early. In 1935–1936. he resumes his scientific and teaching activities. Since 1937 he has been working as a senior researcher at the Institute of History of the Academy of Sciences of the Soviet Union, 1938 – as a professor at the Moscow Pedagogical Institute named after Lenin and Moscow State University. In 1939, on his initiative, the sector of Slavic studies of the Institute of History of the Academy of Sciences of the USSR and the Department of History of the Southern and Western Slavs of Moscow State University was organized. The next year he was reinstated in the rank of academician of the Academy of Sciences of the BSSR, which he was deprived of in 1930. From the second half (probably from November) of 1943, Celina Bobińska and Żanna Kormanowa attended his seminar. Since 1946, Picheta has been deputy director of the Institute of Slavic Studies of the Academy of Sciences of the USSR.

He died on 23 June 1947 and was buried in Moscow at the Novodevichy Cemetery.

On the grave of V.I.Picheta at the Novodevichy cemetery in Moscow, the following is written: Rehabilitated in 1967.

== Scientific activity ==
V.I.Picheta is the author of a large number of works on the history of Russia, Poland, Belarus, Lithuania, and Ukraine. His works of the 1920s and 1930s deal mainly with the socio-economic problems of the Russian history of the Time of Troubles and the abolition of serfdom.

The formation of the Belarusian Soviet historical science is associated with the name of Picheta. The topics of his research included the ethnogenesis of the Belarusian people, the history of Belarusian cities, archeology and local history, the history of the Belarusian language and literature, score of studies – out of 516 works of the scientist, more than 150 are devoted to the history of Belarus.

Picheta's works made a significant contribution to the historiography of Lithuania. His works are devoted to such problems as the emergence and development of the Lithuanian feudal state, the genesis and development of serfdom, the position of the peasantry, and the development of cities. Vladimir Ivanovich studied the legal status of peasants and slaves in Lithuania, the position of this principality within the Commonwealth.

Since 1939, Picheta focused on the history of Poland. In the last years of his life, he worked mainly on the three-volume "History of Poland" (the third volume remained unfinished).

== Awards ==
- Order of the Red Banner of Labour (6 October 1945)
- Medal "For Labour Valour" (1946)
- Medal "For Valiant Labour in the Great Patriotic War 1941–1945"

== Legacy ==
Since 1993, the Belarusian State University has been holding a competition for the V.I.Picheta Prize in the field of social and humanitarian sciences. The prize is awarded only to scientists from BSU.

In 2011, a memorial plaque in honor of Picheta was opened in Minsk (the building of the Faculty of History of the Belarusian State University).

In October 2014, the auditorium of the Faculty of History of BSU was named after V. I. Picheta.

== Notes ==
- Picheta Vladimir Ivanovich, Great Soviet Encyclopedia: [in 30 volumes] / ed. A.M. Prokhorov – 3rd ed. – M .: Soviet encyclopedia, 1969.
- Ekaterinoslav Commercial School: Picheta Vladimir Ivanovich. Victims of political terror in the USSR. Memorial.
- Perchenok FF Picheta Vladimir Ivanovich, Repressed members of the Academy of Sciences of the Soviet Union // Tragic fate: repressed scientists of the Academy of Sciences of the Soviet Union. – M .: Nauka, 1995.
- Yuri F. Ivanov. When and how V.I.Picheta was released, Questions of history. – 2000. – No. 7. – P. 174–175.
- Competition for awards named after V.I.Picheta and A.N.Sevchenko // Official site of BSU.
- Memorial plaques in honor of the rectors of BSU Vladimir Picheta and Anton Sevchenko will be opened on the building of the Faculty of History and in the main building of the university, Official Internet Portal of the Minsk City Executive Committee
- The walls are remembered // Belarus today. – Minsk., 2014. – No. 208 (24589).

== Literature ==
- V. I. Picheta [obituary] // Pravda. 1947 June 25;
- V.I.Picheta. 10/22/1878 – 06/23/1947 // Scientific Notes of the Institute of Slavic Studies. T. 1.M., 1948;
- A. A. Savich, "I. Picheta: His life and scientific activity"
