= Insbot =

Cockroach-like robot

Insbot is a robotic cockroach developed in 2002 by scientists of the European project LEURRE. It is designed to trick real cockroaches into following its lead, with the goal of finding ways of adapting their behavior as a means of natural pest control. At first, Insbot's predecessor, Alice robot, faced some setbacks due to its size and its inability to properly recognize the cockroaches. But after a series of tests, this newer model was developed. It contains more sensors and computational power, which allows it to interact with the cockroaches more efficiently.

== Development of Insbot ==
The scientists from LEURRE developed the first Insbot in 2002 and it has been undergoing development since. It runs on wheels and contains many computer processors, which are connected to cameras and proximity sensors, to help it avoid bumping into obstacles or other cockroaches. In the early stages of production, the group of scientists from LEURRE used a prior model, Alice robot, to conduct acceptance tests to determine how compatible the robot is within the society of cockroaches. The main challenges they faced were the robot's small size, the high level of integration (many sensors), and the darkness of the cockroach cuticle (Infrared (IR) sensors sensitivity). With the help of these tests, the scientists built a newer model which contained IR emitters with increased power, wireless communication modules for monitoring, additional sensors, more computational power, and a greater memory.

== How it works ==
The Insbot is composed of two different types of sensors, IR and chemical, and linear cameras.

The sensors help the robot maneuver itself and identify other cockroaches. One recent challenge was to find a way to add pheromones to the robot which would allow it to communicate and build trust with the other cockroaches. With the help of chemical sensors, the robot is able to emit the cockroach chemical signal that is present on the surface of cockroaches. With these sensors, the robot attracts the other cockroaches. If it does not have them, it scares them away because the cockroaches think it is a predator.

The IR sensors are used to measure proximity, which is important because the robot's behavior is controlled by proximity information. All of its movements and actions depend on where it is and what surrounds it. The IR sensors are also used to distinguish between another cockroach and an obstacle. A sensor is placed on the top of the robot and is activated when it is near an obstacle. Two more sensors are placed at the bottom of the robot and are activated when it is near other cockroaches.

The robot contains linear cameras which are used to identify objects or other cockroaches which are out of the reach of the IR sensors. It identifies dark spots to be a group of cockroaches.

With all of these components, Insbot is able to analyze the movements and behaviors of the cockroaches and mimic them.

== Mission ==
Through the help of Insbot, LEURRE was designed to study and control the behavior of mixed societies (societies made up of robots and animals) in an effort to prove that it is possible to change the global behavior of the mixed society by placing a certain number of carefully programmed robots in it. The behavioural and chemical integration of the Insbot in a cockroach group was experimentally validated in. Proof of concept to control the collective behavior in a mixed society was shown in a collective choice experiment: the cockroaches could choose between two shelters, one more attractive to cockroaches than the other. In the mixed society a minority of robots were programmed to choose the less attractive shelter, which successfully switched the collective choice to this shelter.

=== Small scale applications ===
With its ability to mimic their behavior and smell, Insbot is able to fool the rest of the cockroaches into believing that it is a part of the group. Once this has been accomplished, it then is able to establish itself as leader of the group. In this position, the scientists hope it can get the rest of the cockroaches to follow it out of their hiding places into the open where pest controllers can target them.

=== Larger scale applications ===
Besides pest control, the scientists believe the robot could be helpful to create other forms of artificial intelligence. If Insbot is able to accomplish the task of getting the rest of the cockroaches to follow its lead, it will show that mixed societies can actually be controlled. This control of interactions between artificial life and living organisms is important in many scientific fields like medicine, agriculture, and ethology because all biological levels are taken into account: the cellular level, the organism level, and the human level. The cellular level regards to the mixture of artificial systems and cells like neurons. The organism level regards to intelligent prosthesis. The human level regards to cooperation between humans and robots.
