= Dick Volz Award =

The Dick Volz Best US PhD Thesis in Robotics and Automation is a yearly award to recognize outstanding Ph.D. thesis in the field of robotics and automation at any research institution in the United States of America. It is awarded with a four years delay as it is based both on thesis quality as well as post-graduation impact, hence, the 2007 Dick Volz Best US PhD Thesis Award was awarded in 2011. Its European counterpart is the Georges Giralt PhD Award.

The award is named after Professor Emeritus Richard A. Volz. He was a former Texas A&M Department of Computer Science department head and the president of the IEEE Robotics and Automation Society in 2006-2007. To honor his outstanding research on robotics and control as well as his mentoring, the Dick Volz Best US PhD Thesis in Robotics and Automation was established. The list of award recipients includes the following:

Year	Dick Volz Award	Dick Volz Runner-Up Award	Awarded in
2007	Robert J. Webster III, Johns Hopkins University	Jan Peters, USC	2011
2008	Pieter Abbeel, Stanford University	Michael Kaess, Georgia Institute of Technology; Ed Olson, MIT	2012
2009	TBA at R:SS 2013	TBA at R:SS 2013	2013

The award committee includes Seth A. Hutchinson (University of Illinois Urbana-Champaign), John M. Hollerbach (University of Utah), Vijay Kumar (University of Pennsylvania), Gaurav Sukhatme (University of Southern California), and Henrik I. Christensen (Georgia Tech).

== See also ==
- List of engineering awards
- List of mechanical engineering awards
