= Georges Giralt PhD Award =

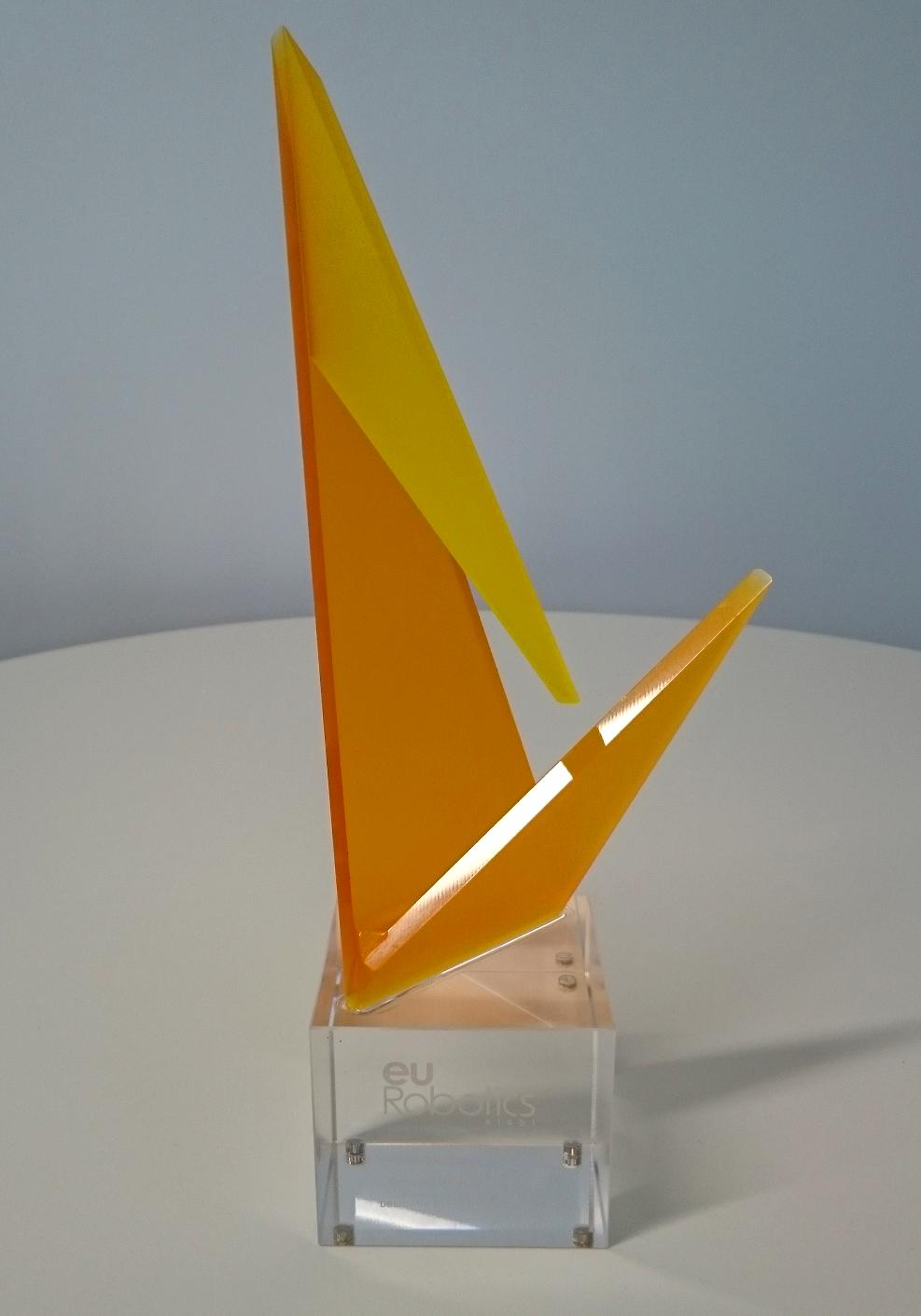
The trophy of the Georges Giralt PhD Award represents one part of the SPARC logo.

The Georges Giralt PhD Award is a European scientific prize for extraordinary contributions to robotics. It is awarded yearly at the European Robotics Forum by euRobotics AISBL, a non-profit organisation based in Brussels with the objective of turning robotics beneficial for Europe’s economy and society.

Georges Giralt received his PhD in 1958, from Paul Sabatier University, in the domain of electrical machines, and soon afterwards became a pioneer in robotics, in Europe and worldwide. He was especially instrumental in bringing in scientific foundations and methodology when the domain was still young, and a loose coupling of mechanical and electrical engineering, adopting the early results of automatic control.

The high reputation of the Georges Giralt PhD Award is based on the prominent role of the awarding institution euRobotics. With more than 250 member organisations, euRobotics represents the academic and industrial robotics community in Europe. Moreover, it provides the European robotics community with a legal entity to engage in a public/private partnership with the European Commission. The award is covered by various media.

Entitled for participation in the Georges Giralt PhD Award are all robotics-related dissertations which have been successfully defended at a European university. The US-American counterpart is the Dick Volz Award.

== Award winners ==
- 2026: Antonio González Morgado
- 2025: Erfan Shahriari
- 2024: Manuel Keppler
- 2023: Antonio Andriella, Ribin Balachandran
- 2022: Antonio Loquercio, Michael Lutter
- 2021: Giuseppe Averta, Bernd Henze
- 2020: Cosimo Della Santina
- 2019: Grazioso Stanislao, Teodor Tomic
- 2018: Frank Bonnet, Daniel Leidner
- 2017: Johannes Englsberger
- 2016: Alexander Dietrich, Mark Müller
- 2015: Jörg Stückler
- 2014: Manuel Catalano, Fabien Expert, Rainer Jaekel
- 2013: Jens Kober
- 2012: Sami Haddadin
- 2011: Mario Pratts
- 2010: Ludovic Righetti
- 2009: Alejandro-Dizan Vasquez-Govea
- 2008: Cyrill Stachniss, Eduardo Rocon
- 2007: Pierre Lamon
- 2006: Martijn Wisse
- 2005: Juan Andrade Cetto
- 2004: Gilles Duchemin
- 2003: Ralf Koeppe
- 2002: Gianluca Antonelli, Jens-Steffen Gutmann
