= Skelding =

Skelding is a surname. Notable people with the surname include:

- Alec Skelding (1886–1960), English cricketer
- George Skelding (1864–1927), Canadian politician
- Kenneth Skelding (1947–2012), South African cricketer
- Susie Barstow Skelding (1857–1934), American illustrator
