= Brunold =

Brunold is a German given name and a surname. Notable people with the surname include:

- Mika Brunold (born 2004), Swiss tennis player
- Paul Brunold (1875-1948), French musician and musicologist
- Thomas Brunold, Swiss slalom canoer & chemist

== See also ==
- Brunhart
