= Roy Brun =

American politician

Roy L. Brun (born January 15, 1953) is an American politician who served in the Louisiana House of Representatives as a Republican from 1988 to 1997.
