= Marian Zgórniak =

Polish historian (1924–2007)

- Born: 5 December 1924; Ropica Polska
- Died: 18 November 2007 (aged 82); Kraków
- Citizenship: Polish
- Occupation: Historian

Marian Zgórniak (5 December 1924 – 18 November 2007) was a Polish historian, survivor of the KL Auschwitz, KL Gross-Rosen and KL Buchenwald.

== Biography ==
He came from a landed gentry family, the son of Stanisław Zgórniak and Władysława. He grew up in Gorlice. During the Nazi occupation of Poland he learned in clandestine education and got involved in the resistance movement as a soldier of Union of Armed Struggle and Home Army. On 2 June 1942 he was arrested by Gestapo.

In 1946 he passed matura.

He worked at the Jagiellonian University. He was elected a member of the Polish Academy of Arts and Sciences. He supervised eighteen doctoral dissertations.

His son Marek Zgórniak became an art historian, professor at the Jagiellonian University.

== Works ==
- Relikty średniowiecznych powinności skarbowych na wsi małopolskiej XVI–XVIII wieku. Warszawa. 1959.
- Wojskowe aspekty kryzysu czechosłowackiego 1938 roku. Kraków. 1966.
- Sytuacja militarna Europy w okresie kryzysu politycznego 1938 r. Warszawa. 1979.
- Wojskowość polska w dobie wojen tureckich drugiej połowy XVII wieku. Wrocław. 1985.
- Za Waszą i naszą wolność. Polacy w europejskiej Wiośnie Ludów 1848–1849. Warszawa. 1987.
- 1914–1918. Studia i szkice z dziejów I wojny światowej. Kraków. 1987.
- Europa w przededniu wojny: sytuacja militarna w latach 1938–1939. Kraków. 1993.
- Wojna i okupacja na Podkarpaciu i Podhalu, na obszarze inspektoratu ZWZ-AK Nowy Sącz, 1939–1945. Kraków. 1998. Co-authored with Grzegorz Mazur and Wojciech Rojek.
- Polska w czasach walk o niepodległość (1815–1864). Kraków. 2001.
- Europa am Abgrund – 1938. Dokumente und Schriften der Europäischen Akademie Otzenhausen. Vol. 100. Münster. 2002.
- G. Nieć, ed. (2009). Studia i rozprawy z dziejów XVI–XX wieku. Historia – militaria – polityka. Kraków: Księgarnia Akademicka.

=== Editions ===
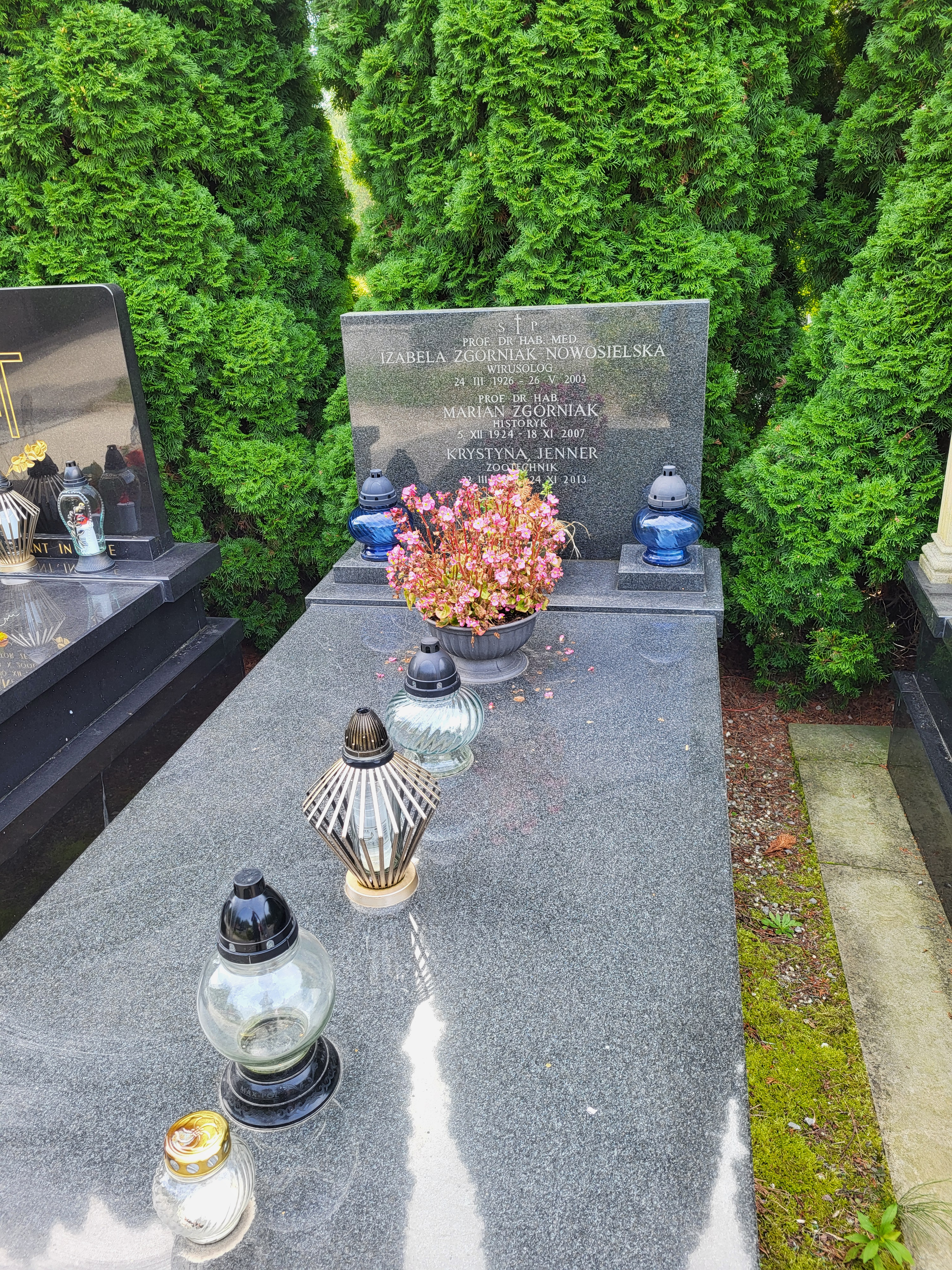
Grave of Marian Zgórniak at the Salwator Cemetery

- Przygotowania niemieckie do agresji na Polskę w 1939 r. w świetle sprawozdań Oddziału II Sztabu Głównego WP (Dokumenty). Wrocław. 1969. Co-edited with M. Cieplewicz.
- Wielkie wojny XX wieku (1914–1945). Kraków. 2006.

== Accolades ==
- Silver Cross of Merit with Swords (1944)
- Cross of the Home Army (1970)
- Gold Cross of Merit (1973)
- Medal of the Commission of National Education (1976)
- Auschwitz Cross (1988)
- Commander's Cross with Star of the Order of Polonia Restituta (2003)
- Honorary Citizen of Gorlice

== Bibliography ==
- Grodziski, Stanisław (January 2008). "Marian (wspomnienie)". Kraków (1): 40–41.
