= Jerzy Holzer =

Polish historian

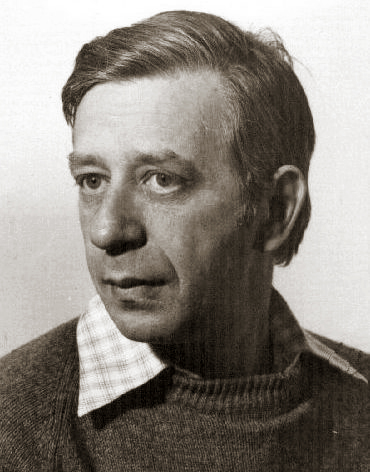
Jerzy Holzer, ca. 1978

Jerzy Stanisław Holzer (24 August 1930, Warsaw - 14 January 2015) was a Polish historian. He specialized in the Polish history, German history, and the Polish-German relations.

In 1950-1954 he studied history at the University of Warsaw. From 1954 to 2000 he worked at the Institute of History of the university. In October 1990 he gained the title of professor. Holzer worked at the Institute of Political Studies of the Polish Academy of Sciences and at Collegium Civitas, he was a member of the Polish Academy of Sciences. He lectured at the universities in Mainz, Freiburg and Berlin.

In 1965 Holzer briefly collaborated with the communist secret service. He was writing reports about Germans responsible for contacts with communist Poland. He announced this fact publicly in 2005. From 1948 to 1979 he was a member of the Polish United Workers' Party. Since 1978 he cooperated with the Workers' Defence Committee and helped to publish several illegal magazines.

In 1980-1981 Holzer helped to organize the Solidarity movement at the University of Warsaw. On 13 December 1981 communist authorities interned him for four months. In 1983 he illegally published the first monography dealing with the Solidarity - "Solidarność" 1980-1981. Geneza i historia (Solidarity 1980-1981. Genesis and History), which had been republished several times since then. Many of his books were published in German.

Holzer died on 14 January 2015 and was buried at Powązki Cemetery in Warsaw. Six days later, President of Poland Bronisław Komorowski awarded him the Officer's Cross of the Order of Polonia Restituta.

== Works ==
- Polska Partia Socjalistyczna w latach 1917-1919 (Polish Socialist Party in 1917-1919) (1962)
- Polska w pierwszej wojnie światowej (together with Jan Molenda, 1963, 1967, 1973)
- Kryzys polityczny w Niemczech 1928-1930. Partie i masy (Political Crisis in Germany 1928-1930. Parties and Masses) (1970)
- Mozaika polityczna Drugiej Rzeczypospolitej (Political Mosaic of the Second Republic) (1974)
- PPS: Szkic dziejów (PPS: Overview of History) (1977)
- Solidarność 1980-1981. Geneza i historia (Solidarity 1980-1981. Genesis and History) (1983, 1984, 1986, 1990)
- Solidarność w podziemiu (together with Krzysztof Leski, 1989)
- Komunizm w Europie (Communism in Europe) (2000)
- Komunizm XX wieku (Communism of the 20th Century) (2001)
- Dwa stulecia Polski i Europy (Two Centuries of Poland and Europe) (2004)
- Europejska tragedia XX wieku. II wojna światowa (European Tragedy of the 20th Century. Second World War) (2005)
- Europa wojen 1914-1945 (Europe of Wars 1914-1945) (2008)
- Polska i Europa: "W Polsce czyli nigdzie?" (2008)
