= Stefan Schaal =

German roboticist (born 1961)

- Born: 1961 (age 64–65); Frankfurt am Main, West Germany
- Education: Technical University of Munich
- Scientific career
- Workplaces: Massachusetts Institute of Technology; Georgia Institute of Technology; Pennsylvania State University; Max Planck Institute for Intelligent Systems; University of Southern California
- Doctoral advisor: Klaus Ehrlenspiel
- Other academic advisors: Christopher G. Atkeson
- Doctoral students: Jan Peters
- Website: stefan-schaal.net

Stefan Schaal (born 1961) is a German-American computer scientist specializing in robotics, machine learning, autonomous systems, and computational neuroscience.

== Education and career ==
Schaal was born in Frankfurt am Main in West Germany, Schaal grew up in the North Bavarian town of Nürnberg. After graduating from school, he served in the West German army in the Ski Patrol Division of Bad Reichenhall, where he honorably discharged with the rank of a Lieutenant. Schaal studied mechanical engineering at the Technical University of Munich, graduating in 1987 with a Diploma degree (summa cum laude). Subsequently, Schaal did his Ph.D. in computer aided design and artificial intelligence at the Technical University of Munich and the Massachusetts Institute of Technology, receiving his Ph.D. in 1991 (Summa Cum Laude) under Klaus Ehrlenspiel.

In 1991, Schaal was a Postdoctoral Fellow at the Department and Brain and Cognitive Science and the Artificial Intelligence Lab at the Massachusetts Institute of Technology, funded by the Alexander von Humboldt Foundation and the German Academic Scholarship Foundation. Starting from 1992, he became an invited researcher at the ATR Computational Neuroscience Labs in Japan, where he created a robotics lab focusing on biological principles of motor control and learning. In 1994, Schaal moved to the Georgia Institute of Technology as an adjunct assistant professor, and also held the same rank at the Pennsylvania State University. In 1996, Schaal assumed a group leader position in the ERATO Kawato Dynamic Brain Project in Japan. Schaal joined the University of Southern California (USC) in 1997, where he advanced from the ranks of assistant professor, to associate professor, to full professor.

In 2009, Schaal became a founder in defining and creating the Max Planck Institute for Intelligent Systems in Tübingen and Stuttgart, Germany, an institute focusing on principles of perception-action-learning systems in synthetic intelligence. In 2012, Schaal founded the Autonomous Motion Department (AMD) at this institute, while maintaining a partial appointment at USC.

Stefan Schaal joined Google X as lead of a robotics research team in late 2018.

== Research ==
Stefan Schaal's interests focus on autonomous perception-action-learning systems, in particular anthropomorphic robotic systems. He works on topics of machine learning for control, control theory, computational neuroscience for neuromotor control, experimental robotics, reinforcement learning, artificial intelligence, and nonlinear dynamical systems. Stefan has co-authored more than 400 publications in top conferences and journals, and served as organizer on various top conferences in machine learning and robotics. He has received numerous best paper awards and honors in his scientific community. Stefan Schaal has been noted as one of the five leaders in robotics in 2011, and among the top robotics experts in the world.

== Controversy ==
In 2018, the German newsjournal Der Spiegel published an article reporting on his double affiliation with USC and the Max-Planck Society, both with full salaries, which was apparently unknown to either party. Schaal rejected the allegations, but was forced to leave his position at the Max Planck Institute.
