= John Brunskill =

Irish cricketer

Cricket information
- Batting: Left-handed
- Bowling: Right-arm medium

International information
- National side: Ireland

Career statistics
Competition	First-class
Matches	4
Runs scored	134
Batting average	16.75
100s/50s	0/1
Top score	58
Balls bowled	85
Wickets	0
Bowling average	–
5 wickets in innings	–
10 wickets in match	–
Best bowling	–
Catches/stumpings	0/–
- Source: CricketArchive, 16 August 2022

John Hanfield Brunskill DSO OBE (17 April 1875 – 21 July 1940) was an Irish cricketer. A left-handed batsman and right-arm medium pace bowler, he played one match for Ireland, against the MCC in May 1895. He also played four first-class matches for Dublin University the same year.

After qualifying in medicine from Trinity College he was commissioned into the Royal Army Medical Corps He served with bravery in the First World War, receiving a Distinguished Service Order for gallantry. At the end of the war he was medical officer in the allied forces Dunsterforce expedition. He retired with the rank of lieutenant-colonel. He moved to England following the end of the War, when he also received the OBE, and became a general practitioner in Kingston upon Thames. He married Elizabeth Robinson and had three children Pamela, Sheila and John.
