= Johannes Brun (officer) =

Norwegian businessman and military officer (1891–1977)

Johannes Schwartz Brun (13 May 1891 – 24 July 1977) was a Norwegian businessperson, military officer and bridge champion.

He was born in Fredrikstad as a son of Sven Busch Brun (1861–1916) and Signe Marie Friis Giebelhausen (1867–1949). He was married to Else Harder (1910–1951).

He finished his secondary education in 1908, finished officer training in 1912 and finished commerce school in Hanover in 1913. He was the manager of timber export company Norsk Trælastexport from 1916 to 1935, and also edited the bridge column in the newspaper Aftenposten from 1924 to 1972. He served as president of the International Bridge League in 1938, was a president of the Norwegian Bridge Federation and was a player on the Norwegian national team. He became a member of the gentlemen's skiing club SK Fram in 1952, became deputy chairman in 1960 and chairman in 1963.

He continued in the military and advanced to captain in 1928 and major in 1944. For participation in the Second World War he was decorated with the Defence Medal 1940–1945 and the War Medal. In 1951 he was promoted to colonel, serving as commander of Akershus Dragoon Regiment no. 1 until 1956. He was also chief aide-de-camp for Haakon VII of Norway from 1953 to 1955.

He received the Haakon VII Jubilee Medal 1905–1955, was decorated with a Grand Knight of the Order of the Falcon, Grand Officer of the Order of the Star of Ethiopia, Commander of the Dutch Order of Orange-Nassau, the Swedish Order of the Sword and the Royal Victorian Order. He died in July 1977 and was buried at Vår Frelsers gravlund.
