= Johanne Brun =

Danish operatic soprano (1874–1954)

Johanne Marie Emilie Brun
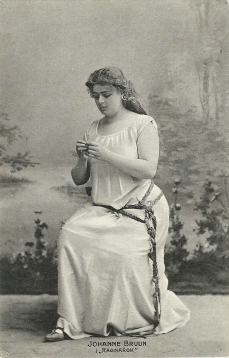
- Brun as Sieglinde in 1902
- Born: Johanne Marie Emilie Prieme; 23 August 1874; Copenhagen, Denmark
- Died: 3 February 1954 (aged 79); Frederiksberg, Denmark
- Occupation: Opera singer
- Years active: 1896 — 1936
- Spouse: Frederik Carl Christian Brun (div 1906)
- Children: 1
- Parent(s): Niels Lorenz Emil Prieme, Johanne Dorthea Henriksen

Johanne Marie Emilie Brun née Prieme (1874–1954) was a Danish operatic soprano. She made her début at the Royal Danish Theatre in 1896 as the Queen of the Night in The Magic Flute. In 1916, after being honoured with the title of Royal Chamber Singer, she sang at opera houses in Germany, becoming a favourite of the Nuremberg opera and later performing in Aachen and Danzig. In 1924 she returned to Denmark where she had to cope with financial difficulties.

== Biography ==
Born on 23 August 1874 in the Frederiksberg district of Copenhagen, Johanne Marie Emilie Prieme was the daughter of the commercial traveller Niels Lorenz Emil Prieme (1841–1882) and his wife Johanne Dorthea née Henriksen (1836–1907). In 1893, she married the opera singer Frederik Carl Christian Brun (1852–1919). Their daughter Gertrud was born in 1894. The marriage was dissolved in 1906.

When she was seven, she entered the Royal Danish Ballet school, singing in a children's chorus in Carmen when she was ten. Aged 19, she married the prominent Wagnerian tenor Frederik Brun. Recognizing the potential of her "powerful voice", together with the voice teacher Fanny Gætje and the conductor Frederik Rung, he trained her for the next 18 months. As a result, in May 1896 she was able to make her stage début at the Royal Danish Theatre as the Queen of the Night in The Magic Flute, mastering the role's coloratura requirements as well as its dramatic components.

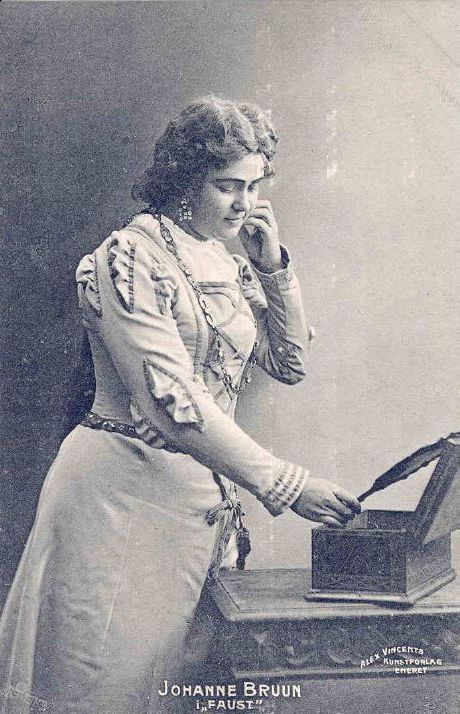
Johanne Brun

It was not until May 1898 that Brun made her second appearance, this time in the title role in Aïda, receiving ever warmer acclaim from the critics, both as a singer and an actress. She was engaged for the following season as a soloist, singing Margarethe in Faust and Donna Anna in Don Giovanni. In subsequent seasons, under year-to-year engagements, her roles included Leonora in Il trovatore, Desdemona in Otello, Elsa in Lohengrin, and Ingeborg in Peter Heise's Drot og marsk. In 1902, thanks to the initiative of the Norwegian conductor Johan Svendsen, the Royal Danish Opera staged The Ring Cycle, giving Brun her first Wagnerian role, that of Sieglinde in Die Walküre. In February 1905, still under Svendsen, she played Brünnhilde in Götterdämmerung. Brun, who had still not received a permanent contract, featured in the complete performances of the Ring from 1909 to 1912. Thereafter, perhaps as a result of her increasing weight, she was engaged less frequently for key roles, appearing less regularly at the Royal Opera. Nevertheless in 1915 she gave a triumphal performance of Isolde in the Danish première of Tristan und Isolde. The same year, probably as a result of conflicts with the stage director Julius Lehmann (1861–1931), she failed to be chosen to sing Kundry in Parsifal. She began seriously to consider moving to sing in Germany.

At her last performance at the Royal Danish Opera in May 1916, she again played Aïda, this time in the presence of the king and queen who honoured her as a Royal Chamber Singer. She then left Denmark to join the opera in Nuremberg, undergoing preparatory coaching in the German versions of Wagner's operas in Berlin. She received a two-year contract in August 1916 but despite a higher salary found the conditions in Germany far more difficult than in Copenhagen. In addition to long working hours in Nuremberg, she was required to sing in Augsburg, Cologne and Würzburg. She nevertheless performed all the Wagnerian heroines as well as the leading soprano roles in Fidelio, Un ballo in maschera, La Juive, Aïda and Il trovatore. She was particularly successful performing in Eugen d'Albert's Die toten Augen, receiving unending applause, large flower arrangements and written congratulations from the mayor. In 1920, for her performance of Brünnhilde, she was acclaimed a genius in the Nordbayerischer Zeitung.

For reasons unknown, she moved to Aachen in 1922 but faced difficult conditions the following year when the city was occupied by the Belgians. In early 1924, she was able to move to Danzig (now Gdansk) where she once again performed her best roles. On two occasions that year she was invited to perform in Copenhagen, first as Philine in Mignon, then on 2 April as Brünnhilde in Die Walküre. It was to be her last performance in Denmark.

She returned to live in Copenhagen in 1925 but without a pension from the Royal Opera had to earn a living selling lottery tickets. In 1936, thanks to the record enthusiast Knud Hegermann-Lindencrone, she completed a set of seven records singing from Das Rheingold, Götterdämmerung and Tristan und Isolde.

Johanne Brun died in Frederiksberg on 3 February 1954.
