= Brun (given name) =

Brun is a masculine given name which may refer to:

- Brun or Bruno of Querfurt (c. 974 – 1009), Christian missionary bishop and martyr
- Brun I, Count of Brunswick (c. 975 – c. 1010)
- Brun or Bruno, Duke of Saxony (died 880)
- Brun Smith (1922–1997), New Zealand cricketer
