= European Robotics Platform =

The European Robotics Platform (EUROP) is one of several European Technology Platforms (ETP) to improve the competitive situation of the European Union. EUROP is an industry-driven framework for the main stakeholders in robotics to strengthen Europe's competitiveness in robotics R&D, as well as global markets, and to improve quality of life. To this aim EUROP has developed a joint European Strategic Research Agenda (SRA), which would help focus research initiatives and innovative activities towards maximum impact. The SRA was published in July 2009.

The SRA was first launched in 2005. Its revision started in 2006, supported by the European Commission through CARE, the Coordination Action for Robotics in Europe. An Executive Summary of an intermediate version of the new SRA was published in June 2008. The final version was presented in the summer of 2009 and is currently available.

EUROP's roots go back to October 2004, when leading European robotics organisations started to formulate the need for a consolidated approach to European robotics, which led to the constitution of EUROP as an ETP in October 2005. From 2010 to 2012, The European Robotics Coordination Action (euRobotics CA), an EU project within the Seventh Framework Programme of the Information and Communication Technology, supported EUROP.
