= Gerald Brunskill (British Army officer) =

Major-General Gerald Brunskill CB MC
- Brunskill in 1942
- Born: 2 June 1894
- Died: 26 September 1964 (aged 70)
- Military career
- Allegiance: United Kingdom
- Branch: British Army
- Service years: 1914–1919; 1921–1948
- Rank: Major-General
- Unit: Royal Sussex Regiment
- Commands: British Troops in Siam (1946); 129th Infantry Brigade (1941–42); 1st Battalion, Royal Ulster Rifles (1939–40)
- Conflicts: First World War; Arab revolt in Palestine; Second World War
- Awards: Companion of the Order of the Bath; Military Cross; Mentioned in Despatches

Major-General Gerald Brunskill, CB, MC (2 June 1894 – 26 September 1964) was a British Army officer who saw service in both of the world wars, serving as a junior officer in the First World War and as a general officer in the Second World War.

== Military career ==
Born the son of a barrister in Dublin on 2 June 1894, Brunskill received his education at Shrewsbury and at Trinity College, Dublin. He was commissioned into the Royal Sussex Regiment of the British Army in 1914, the same year World War I began in Europe. As with many others of his generation, his war service was spent mainly on the Western Front, where he earned the Military Cross in 1918 and was also mentioned in despatches.

The war having ended in November 1918 due to the Armistice with Germany, Brunskill left the army, albeit only briefly, working as a businessman in London before being re-commissioned into the Royal Ulster Rifles in 1921. The next few years for him were spent as a captain, due to the slow rate of promotion in the army during the interwar period. He attended the Staff College at Camberley from 1924 to 1925 and then, almost a decade later, served as a brigade major with the North Midland Area from 1933 to 1936. His next major posting was in Palestine, then engaged in the Arab revolt, before going to India to take command of the first battalion of his regiment, then serving on the Northwest Frontier. He was still there when the Second World War began in September 1939.

In March 1941, after having returned to the United Kingdom, Brunskill was promoted to brigadier and given command of the 129th Infantry Brigade, part of the 43rd Division, a post he held until August 1942 when he was made Director of Special Weapons and Vehicles at the War Office in London. He was to hold this position until 1945, receiving a further promotion to the acting rank of major general in July 1943. This was made temporary a year later.

With the war now over Brunskill then received another appointment, this time as general officer commanding (GOC) British Troops in Thailand, a position he held only briefly, from January–May 1946. The following year he moved on to become deputy master-general of the ordnance in India before being Deputy Chief of the General Staff, India, until his final retirement from the army in 1948. Having been reverted to his substantive rank of brigadier in late 1947, he was granted the honorary rank of major general upon his retirement.

Brunskill was employed for eight years by the Medical Research Council in London. After that he was commander of the Kent St. John Ambulance Brigade and deputy lieutenant for the county of Kent in 1962, shortly before his death in 1964.

== Bibliography ==
- Smart, Nick (2005). Biographical Dictionary of British Generals of the Second World War. Barnsley: Pen and Sword Books. ISBN 1844150496.
