= Brunhart =

Brunhart is a surname. Notable people with the surname include:

- Arthur Brunhart (born 1952), President of the Landtag of Liechtenstein
- Bernadette Brunhart (born 1945), Liechtenstein journalist, politician and suffragist
- Christian Brunhart (politician, born 1851) (1851–1991), Liechtenstein politician
- Christian Brunhart (politician, born 1956) (born 1956), Liechtenstein politician
- Daniel Brunhart (born 1968), judoka from Liechtenstein
- Fidel Brunhart (1900–1970), Liechtenstein politician
- Hans Brunhart (born 1945), Prime Minister of Liechtenstein from 1978 to 1993
- Heinrich Andreas Brunhart (1902–1950), Liechtenstein politician
- Louis Brunhart (1902–1980), Liechtenstein politician
- Walter Brunhart (1912–1991), Mayor of Balzers

== See also ==
- Brunold
