= Nicholas Roy =

Canadian-American aerospace engineer

Nicholas Roy is a Canadian-American computer scientist at the Massachusetts Institute of Technology. He is R.L. Bisplinghoff Professor of Aeronautics and Astronautics at MIT and a principal investigator at the MIT Computer Science and Artificial Intelligence Laboratory, where he leads the Robust Robotics Group.

His research focuses on robotics, machine learning, autonomous systems, planning and reasoning, human-computer interaction and micro air vehicles and also principles of autonomy and decision-making. Alums from his group have gone on to work for and launch major companies that include Zoox and Skydio.

Roy received his PhD under Sebastian Thrun and Tom Mitchell at Carnegie Mellon University in 2003.
