= Julian Brun =

Polish and Soviet politician and journalist

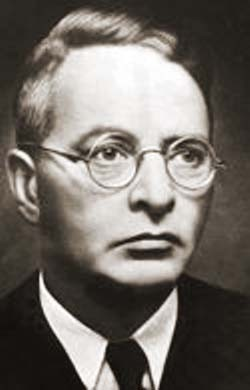
- Born: 21 April 1886; Warsaw, Warsaw Governorate, Congress Poland
- Died: 28 April 1942 (aged 56); Saratov, Russian SFSR, Soviet Union
- Occupations: Journalist, historian, essayist, literary critic
- Political party: SDKPiL; KPP; KPZB

Julian Brun (21 April 1886 – 28 April 1942) was a Polish and Soviet communist politician, journalist and historian.

== Biography ==
Brun was born in to the family of a tobacco factory owner. In 1902 he was expelled from the pro-gymnasium for participating in a May Day demonstration. In 1903 he joined the Union of Socialist Youth and co-edited its magazine Ruch. In February 1904 he was arrested for political activity, in May he was released due to lack of evidence. He was arrested again during a socialist demonstration at Grzybów Square in Warsaw on November 13, 1904. He was detained in Pawiak and in the Warsaw Citadel. In 1905 he became a member of the Social Democracy of the Kingdom of Poland and Lithuania (SDKPiL) and was active in Warsaw, Lublin and the Dąbrowa Basin. In 1906 he went to Paris, where he studied sociology at the Sorbonne and was active in the Paris section of the SDKPiL. In 1908 he married the English painter Mary Houghton and in 1909 he studied photoengraving in London. In the autumn of 1912 he went to Kraków, where he married again to the SDKPiL activist Stefania Unszlicht, sister of Józef Unszlicht. From the spring of 1913 to 1919 he lived in Bulgaria.

In 1919 Brun returned to Poland and became a member of the newly founded Communist Party of Poland (KPP). In 1923 he was elected a member of the Central Committee of the Communist Party of Poland. At the same time he became a member of the Communist Party of Western Belorussia (KPZB) and was soon elected to its central committee. In 1924 he was arrested by the Polish authorities for anti-state activity and sentenced to eight years in prison. In 1926 he arrived in the Soviet Union as part of an exchange of political prisoners after which he became a correspondent for the Soviet Telegraph Agency. From 1929 he lived in France and Belgium and continued to be active in the leading organs of the KPP and KPZB.

After the start of Second World War Brun was arrested by the Nazis in Belgium and sent to France. Placed in a concentration camp, he managed to organize an escape in July 1941 and moved back to the USSR. He lived in Saratov, where he served as editor of the Polish editorial board of the Ukrainian radio station. He died on April 28, 1942, in Saratov after a long illness.

== Commemoration ==
In 1952, the Warsaw Journalist's House on Foksal Street was named after Brun, and he was also was the patron of one of the main journalistic awards for young publicists granted by the Association of Polish Journalists. In 1962, a street in Warsaw's Mokotów district was named after Brun. The street's name was changed in 2017 under decommunisation.

== Publications ==
- Stefana Żeromskiego tragedia pomyłek (1926)
- Kwestia narodowa w rewolucji i kontrrewolucji (1936),
- Przyczynki do kwestii narodowej
- La naissance de l'armee nationale (1789–1794) pod pseudonimem Jules Leverrie (1939).
- "Pisma wybrane" (PDF). nowakrytyka.pl. Archived from the original (PDF) on 2016-03-06. (1956).
- Zjednoczenie narodowe i wojna domowa, BUS, Kraków 1992, ISBN 83-85658-05-X.
