= Bruen =

Bruen is a surname. Notable people with the surname include:

- Francis Bruen (died 1867), Member of the UK Parliament for Carlow 1835–1837, 1839
- Henry Bruen:
  - Henry Bruen (1741–1795), Irish politician, Member of the Parliament of Ireland for Jamestown 1783–1790 and County Carlow 1790–1795
  - Colonel Henry Bruen (1789–1852), Irish politician, Member of the UK Parliament for County Carlow 1812–1831, 1835–1837, 1840–1852
  - his son Henry Bruen (1828–1912), MP for County Carlow 1857–1880
- Jack Bruen (1949–1997), American basketball coach
- John Bruen (1560–1625), English Puritan squire
- Ken Bruen (1951–2025), Irish writer

== See also ==
- Bruen Stapleford, a civil parish in the unitary authority of Cheshire West, in England
- USS Sarah Bruen (1862), a wooden schooner acquired by the United States Navy during the beginning of the American Civil War
- New York State Rifle & Pistol Association, Inc. v. Bruen (NYSRPA v. Bruen), a Second Amendment landmark decision issued by the U.S. Supreme Court in 2022
- Brune (disambiguation), including surname
