= Henry Bruen =

Henry Bruen may refer to:

- Henry Bruen (1741–1795), Irish politician, member of the Parliament of Ireland for Jamestown 1783–1790 and Carlow County 1790–1795
- Henry Bruen (1789–1852), Irish politician, member of the UK Parliament for County Carlow 1812–1831, 1835–1837, 1840–1852
- Henry Bruen (1828–1912), his son, MP for County Carlow 1857–1880
- Henry Bruen (cricketer) (1856–1927), Irish cricketer and British Army officer

== See also ==
- Bruen (surname)
