= John Milley Doyle =

Sir John Milley Doyle KCB (1781 – 9 August 1856) was an Anglo-Irish soldier who fought in the Peninsular War and in the War of the Two Brothers.

He was briefly a Whig Member of Parliament for County Carlow.

== Early life ==
The second son of Nicholas Milley Doyle, Church of Ireland Rector of Newcastle, County Tipperary, and the grandson of Charles Doyle of Bramblestown, County Kilkenny, Doyle was a nephew of General Sir John Doyle and General Welbore Ellis Doyle (1758–1797), Military Governor of British Ceylon, and a cousin of Lieutenant-General Sir Charles William Doyle. On 31 May 1794, aged thirteen, he was commissioned as an ensign into the newly raised 107th Regiment of Foot.

Doyle was a brother of the campaigner for women's rights Anna Wheeler.

== Career ==
On 21 June 1794 Doyle was promoted Lieutenant into the newly raised 108th Regiment of Foot, the Earl of Granard's. He saw active service in the suppression of the Irish Rebellion of 1798. The next year he went to Gibraltar as aide-de-camp to his uncle, then Brigadier-General John Doyle. He remained with the older Doyle throughout the British expedition to Egypt and was at the Battle of Fuentes de Oñoro and the storming of Ciudad Rodrigo.

On 26 September 1811 Doyle was promoted lieutenant-colonel in the British Army. On 1 January 1812 he transferred as a full colonel to the 19th Portuguese Infantry Regiment, part of Le Cor's Portuguese brigade, attached to Dalhousie's division of the Anglo-Portuguese Army, commanding this regiment at the Battle of Vitoria and the Battle of the Pyrenees. In October 1812 he was made a Knight of the Order of the Tower and Sword. In the winter of 1813 Dalhousie went home to England on leave, and with General Le Cor taking command of the 7th Division, Doyle succeeded Le Cor at the head of the Portuguese 6th Brigade. He led it at the Battle of Nivelle and at Orthes and then in the march on Bordeaux.

At the end of the war with the defeat of Napoleon, Doyle left the Anglo-Portuguese Army, was made a Knight Commander of the Order of the Bath, and was appointed as inspecting officer of militia in Guernsey. Still in contact with the Portuguese, in June 1823 he chartered a steamer at his own expense and used it to take despatches for Dom Pedro to Cádiz. He was arrested by Dom Miguel, imprisoned for months in Lisbon, and not released until after the British minister, Sir Frederick Lamb, took up his case.

In 1831 Doyle was elected as one of the Members of Parliament for County Carlow and retained the seat in the House of Commons until 1832. However, he went on helping Dom Pedro with money and served as major-general and aide-de-camp to Pedro in the Siege of Porto of 1832. When the Liberal Wars ended, Doyle was persuaded to resign his commission in return for being paid for his past services and being refunded the money of his own he had laid out, but the Portuguese never paid him. By petitions, Doyle succeeded in getting a mixed commission appointed to deal with the debts owed to the British and Irish officers, but this subsequently paid out every one of those officers except himself. For many years he pursued legal actions to get what he was owed, but never succeeded. Finally giving up, in July 1853 he accepted an appointment as a Military Knight of Windsor and as a sergeant-at-arms to Queen Victoria.

Doyle died at Windsor Castle on 9 August 1856 and was buried with military honours near the south side of St George's Chapel.

== Notes ==
Parliament of the United Kingdom
Preceded by Henry Bruen; Thomas Kavanagh	Member of Parliament for County Carlow; 1831 – 1832; With: Walter Blackney	Succeeded by Walter Blackney; Thomas Wallace
