= Thomas Wallace (Irish MP) =

Irish Whig Party politician

Thomas Wallace (13 April 1765 – 9 January 1847) was an Irish Whig Party politician who sat in the House of Commons of the United Kingdom as a member of parliament (MP) for Yarmouth from 1827 to 1830, from 1831 to 1835 for Drogheda and then for County Carlow.

Wallace was a Dublin barrister. He stood unsuccessfully for Drogheda at the general elections in 1818, 1820, 1826 before being elected as a Tory for Yarmouth at a by-election in August 1827. He held the Yarmouth seat until the 1830 general election, when he did not defend the seat. He contested Drogheda again in 1831, before winning the seat at an unopposed by-election in October 1831.

At the 1832 general election he was elected as one of the two MPs for County Carlow, and held the seat until he retired from the Commons at the 1835 general election.

Wallace died at the age of 81.

Parliament of the United Kingdom
Preceded by Lord Binning; Joseph Phillimore	Member of Parliament for Yarmouth (Isle of Wight); 1827 – 1830; With: Joseph Phillimore	Succeeded by William Yates Peel; George Lowther Thompson
Preceded by John Henry North	Member of Parliament for Drogheda; 1831 – 1832	Succeeded by Andrew Carew O'Dwyer
Preceded by Sir John Milley Doyle; Walter Blackney	Member of Parliament for County Carlow; 1832 – 1835; With: Walter Blackney	Succeeded by Thomas Kavanagh; Henry Bruen
