= Walter Kavanagh =

Walter Kavanagh may refer to:

- Walter MacMurrough Kavanagh (1856–1922), Irish politician
- Walter Kavanagh (cricketer) (1814–1836), Irish cricketer
