= Denis Robert Pack-Beresford =

Irish entomologist and arachnologist

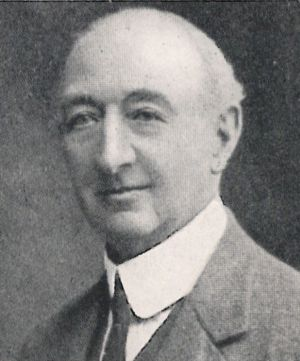
- Born: 23 March 1864; Bagenalstown, County Carlow, Ireland
- Died: 6 March 1942 (aged 77); Bagenalstown, Ireland
- Education: Christ Church, Oxford
- Scientific career
- Fields: Entomology, Arachnology

Denis Robert Pack-Beresford OBE (1864–1942) was an Irish entomologist and arachnologist.

== Life ==
Denis Robert Pack-Beresford was born on 23 March 1864, the son of Denis Pack-Beresford of Fenagh House, Bagenalstown, County Carlow, and Annette Brown. He was the eldest son of nine children. His father served as MP for County Carlow from 1862 to 1868. Pack-Beresford attended Rugby School, and then Christ Church, Oxford, graduating with a Bachelor of Arts in 1887.

Pack-Beresford married Alice Harriet Cromie Lyle (c.1869 – 2 June 1918) in 1891, with which he had one adopted daughter, Vera. Aside from his interest in zoology, Pack-Beresford became the estate owner at Fenagh House in 1881, and went on to serve as the High Sheriff of Carlow, the Deputy Lieutenant, and Justice of the Peace. He was appointed an OBE in 1918. He died on 6 March 1942, and his estate passed to his nephew Commander Denis John Pack-Beresford. During the First World War Denis R. Pack-Beresford served on the committee of the Order of St John and British Red Cross Society as part of the civilian war effort.

== Zoological work ==
Although Pack-Beresford is noted as being interested in natural history since childhood, he did not publish on the subject until 1898. He is most notable for his contributions to the field of arachnology and the study of woodlice and wasps in Ireland and Britain. He was a member of the Royal Irish Academy (RIA) sitting on its council, and the Royal Dublin Society (RDS) acting as hon. secretary and vice-president during his life. It was through his association with the RIA that he took part in its surveys of Lambay and Clare Island. He was encouraged in his study of woodlice by R.F. Scharff, and G.H. Carpenter to work on spiders.

Due to failing eyesight, Pack-Beresford had to give up his work towards the end of his life, as it relied heavily on the use of microscopes. His zoological collections are now housed in the Natural History Museum, Dublin and his papers are held by the Royal Irish Academy.

== Some published works ==
- Buchanan-Wollaston, H.J. & Pack-Beresford, D.R. 1907 Contributions to a natural history of Lambay: Crustacea Arthrostraca. Irish Naturalist 16: 59
- Pack-Beresford, D.R. 1907 Contributions to a natural history of Lambay: Araneida. Irish Naturalist 16: 61–65
- Pack-Beresford, D.R., 1911 Clare Island Survey: A biological survey of Clare Island, Co. Mayo: Araneida, Proceedings of the Royal Irish Academy, Vol. XXXI, Sect. 2, Part. 35, pp. 1–8, December 1911
- Pack-Beresford, D.R. 1929 Report on recent additions of the Irish fauna and flora. Araneida. A revision of the Irish spider list. Proceedings of the Royal Irish Academy 39B: 41–52
