= High Sheriff of Carlow =

British Crown's judicial representative (1922)

The High Sheriff of Carlow was the British Crown's judicial representative in County Carlow, Ireland from the 14th century until 1922, when the office was abolished in the new Free State and replaced by the office of Carlow County Sheriff. The sheriff had judicial, electoral, ceremonial and administrative functions and executed High Court Writs. In 1908, an Order in Council made the Lord-Lieutenant the Sovereign's prime representative in a county and reduced the High Sheriff's precedence. However, the sheriff retained his responsibilities for the preservation of law and order in the county. The usual procedure for appointing the sheriff from 1660 onwards was that three persons were nominated at the beginning of each year from the county and the Lord Lieutenant then appointed his choice as High Sheriff for the remainder of the year. Often the other nominees were appointed as under-sheriffs. Sometimes a sheriff did not fulfil his entire term through death or other event and another sheriff was then appointed for the remainder of the year. The dates given hereunder are the dates of appointment. All addresses are in County Carlow unless stated otherwise.

== High Sheriffs of County Carlow ==
- 1355: Henry Traharne (also Escheator of County Carlow)
- 1356: William Vale
- 1358: William Vale, again
- 1374: Geoffrey Vale
- 1405: Richard fitz Esmond Butler
- 1414: Thomas Vale
- 1583: George Carew, 1st Earl of Totnes
- 1612: Sir Thomas Butler, 1st Baronet of Cloughgrenan
- 1619: Nicholas Harman of Carlow
- 1622: Sir Thomas Butler, 1st Baronet of Cloughgrenan
- 1641: Edward Butler
- 1650: Henry Prittie
- 1662: Thomas Burdett of Dunmore
- 1670: Sir Thomas Butler, 3rd Baronet
- 1686: William Brereton
- 1689: Mark Baggot (Jacobite)
- 1691: Sir Thomas Butler, 3rd Baronet
- 1694: Edmond Jones
- 1695: Benjamin Bunbury of Killerig
- 1700: Urban Vigors
- 1701: Sir Thomas Burdett, 1st Baronet of Garryhill
- 1706: George Brereton
- 1707: Digby Berkeley
- 1708: Thomas Bernard of Oldtown and Clonmulsh
- 1712: Michael Warren
- 1713: Benjamin Bunbury
- 1714: Richard Vigors
- 1715: Henry Percy
- 1716: Charles Nuttall
- 1717: Wentworth Harman
- 1718: Charles Bernard of Bernard's Grove
- 1719: Jeffrey Paul
- 1721: Richard Wolseley
- 1722: William Pendred
- 1724: Samuel Burton of Burton Hall, Carlow
- 1725: Richard Wolseley
- 1730: Joseph Bernard of Straw Hill
- 1730: Robert Burton
- 1733: Denny Cuffe
- 1736: Benjamin Burton of Burton Hall, Carlow
- 1737: William Brereton
- 1743: I. Thomas Trench
- 1744: Jacob Peppard Warren
- 1751: George Brereton
- 1754: Ralph Howard, 1st Viscount Wicklow
- 1758: John Rochfort
- 1760: Benjamin Burton of Burton hall, Carlow

== George III, 1760–1820 ==
- 1761: Thomas Bunbury
- 1762:
- 1766: John Vigors of Old Leighlin
- 1767: Vesey Colclough
- 1768:
- 1769: William Bunbury
- 1770: Clement Wolseley
- 1771: Thomas Whelan
- 1772:
- 1773: John Perkins
- 1775: Benjamin Burton Doyne
- 1776: James Garrett of Janeville
- 1777: George Bunbury of Rathmore
- 1782: Richard Mercer, of Lodge
- 1783: William Vicars, of Ballinakill
- 1784: Sir Richard Butler, 7th Baronet of Garyhunden
- 1785: Henry Bruen of Sportland
- 1787: Robert Cornwall
- 1788:
- 1789: Harry Bunbury Lodge
- 1790:
- 1794: John Drought
- 1794: William Browne
- 1795: John Maxwell Barry of Newtownbarry
- 1797: John Newton
- 1800: Edward Eustace of Castlemore
- 1802: John Bennett
- 1804: Henry Colclough
- 1805: David Latouche of Upton
- 1806: William Garrett of Janeville
- 1807: Robert Anthony Latouche, jnr
- 1808: Robert Marshall
- 1809: John Cornwall
- 1810: Benjamin Disraeli of Bettyville House, Carlow (uncle of British PM)
- 1811: William Knott
- 1812: Gilbert Pickering Rudkin of Wells
- 1813: James Eustace of Castlemore
- 1814: Beauchamp Colclough and Henry Colclough
- 1815: Henry Guy Colclough
- 1816: Benjamin Burton
- 1817: John Faulkner Cornwall
- 1818: Sir Thomas Butler, 8th Baronet
- 1819: John Dawson Duckett of Duckett's Grove

== George IV, 1820–1830 ==
- 1820: Sir Charles Burton, 3rd Baronet
- 1821: William Richard Stewart
- 1822: William Fitzwilliam Burton of Burton Hall
- 1823: John Staunton Rochfort
- 1824: John Alexander, jnr. of Milford,
- 1825: William Duckett
- 1827: W.Newton
- 1828: John James Lecky of Ballykealey

== William IV, 1830–1837 ==
- 1831: Robert Clayton Browne of Browne's Hill
- 1833: Horace Rochfort
- 1834: John Watson of Ballydarton
- 1834: Philip Bagnall of Drumleckney
- 1835: James Hardy Eustace of Hardymount and Castlemore
- 1836: Sir Richard Pierce Butler, 9th Baronet
- 1837: George R. Keogh

== Victoria, 1837–1901 ==
- 1838: John George Brabazon Ponsonby, 5th Earl of Bessborough
- 1839:
- 1840: Horace William Noel Rochfort, of Clogrenane
- 1841:
- 1842: Hon. Somerset Richard Maxwell of Mountnugent
- 1843: Thomas Tench Vigors of Erindale
- 1844: Sir Robert Joshua Paul, 3rd Baronet of Paulville, Ballyglan
- 1845: Robert Stephen Doyne
- 1846: Philip Jocelyn Newton
- 1847: Hugh Faulkner
- 1848: Samuel Elliott of Racrogue
- 1849: William Fitzwilliam Burton
- 1850: Beauchamp Bartholomew Newton
- 1851: Charles William Cuffe Burton, 5th Baronet
- 1852: Sir Clement Wolseley, 5th Baronet of Mount Wolseley
- 1853: John Beauchamp Brady of Myshall House
- 1854: William Duckett of Duckett's Grove
- 1855: Rt Hon Henry Bruen
- 1856: John Newton
- 1857: Arthur MacMurrough Kavanagh, The MacMorrough
- 1858: Denis William Pack-Beresford of Fenagh Lodge, Bagnalstown
- 1859: William Clayton Browne-Clayton
- 1860: John Lecky Watson of Kiloonnor, Fenagh
- 1861: Sir John Richard Wolseley, 6th Baronet, of Castletown
- 1862: Hardy Eustace of Castlemore and Hardymount
- 1863:
- 1864: John Frederic Lecky of Ballykealey.
- 1865: Captain William Bunbury M'Clintock Bunbury of Rathvilly, Baltinglass.
- 1866: Sir Thomas Pierce Butler, 10th Baronet of Ballintemple, Tullow.
- 1867: Maurice James Eustace of Newstown.
- 1868: Robert Westley Hall-Dare of Newtonbarry.
- 1869: Philip Charles Newton.
- 1870: John Cornwall Brady of Myshall.
- 1871: Beauchamp Frederick Bagenal of Benekerry House.
- 1873: Steuart James Charles Duckett of Russelltown.
- 1874: James Eustace of Newstown.
- 1875: Charles Mervyn Doyne.
- 1875: Peter George FitzGerald, 1st Baronet.
- 1876: Thomas Kane McClintock-Bunbury, 2nd Baron Rathdonnell
- 1878: James Walter Milles Stopford, 6th Earl of Courtown.
- 1879: Charles Edward Henry Duckett-Steuart of Rutland Lodge.
- 1880: John William McClintock-Bunbury.
- 1881:
- 1882: Robert Abraham Brewster French-Brewster of Cloonanartmore.
- 1884: Walter MacMurrough Kavanagh of Borris.
- 1885:
- 1886: Henry Bruen.
- 1887: Ambrose More-O'Ferrall of Balyna, County Kildare.
- 1888: Sir Maurice Fitzgerald, 20th Knight of Kerry.
- 1890: Denis Robert Pack-Beresford of Fenagh House.
- 1891: John Alexander of Milford House.
- 1892:
- 1893: Charles John Engledow.
- 1894: Philip Doyne of Holloden.
- 1895: John James Hardy Rowland Eustace-Duckett of Castlemore and Hardymount.
- 1896: Robert Westley Hall-Dare
- 1897: William Peisley Hutchinson Lloyd-Vaughan.
- 1898: Edward Ponsonby, 8th Earl of Bessborough.
- 1899: Thomas Herbert Robertson.
- 1900: John Bonham of Ballintaggart.

== Edward VII, 1901–1910 ==
- 1901: Godwin Butler Meade Swifte of Swiftsheath and Foulksrath Castle and Lionsden
- 1902: Dermot Henry Doyne
- 1903: Louis Perrin-Hatchell of Fortfield House
- 1904: Henry Philip Newton of Mount Leinster
- 1905: Sir Richard Pierce Butler, 11th Baronet
- 1906: Stanley Edward Denyer of Pollacton
- 1907: Lt-Col. Robert Clayton Browne-Clayton, D.S.O., of Browne's Hill
- 1909: Thomas Leopold McClintock-Bunbury, 3rd Baron Rathdonnell
- 1910: William Fitzwilliam Burton

== George V 1910–1936 ==
- 1911: Walter Henry Mountiford Westropp-Dawson
- 1920: Charles Richard Butler
