= Henry Bruen (cricketer) =

Irish cricketer and British Army officer

Personal information
- Full name: Henry Bruen
- Born: 26 July 1856; Oak Park, Ireland
- Died: 26 December 1927 (aged 71); Oak Park, Leinster, Ireland
- Batting: Unknown
- Bowling: Unknown

Career statistics
Competition	First-class
Matches	2
Runs scored	39
Batting average	19.50
100s/50s	–/–
Top score	19
Balls bowled	400
Wickets	10
Bowling average	15.00
5 wickets in innings	1
10 wickets in match	–
Best bowling	6/54
Catches/stumpings	2/–
- Source: Cricinfo, 27 August 2019

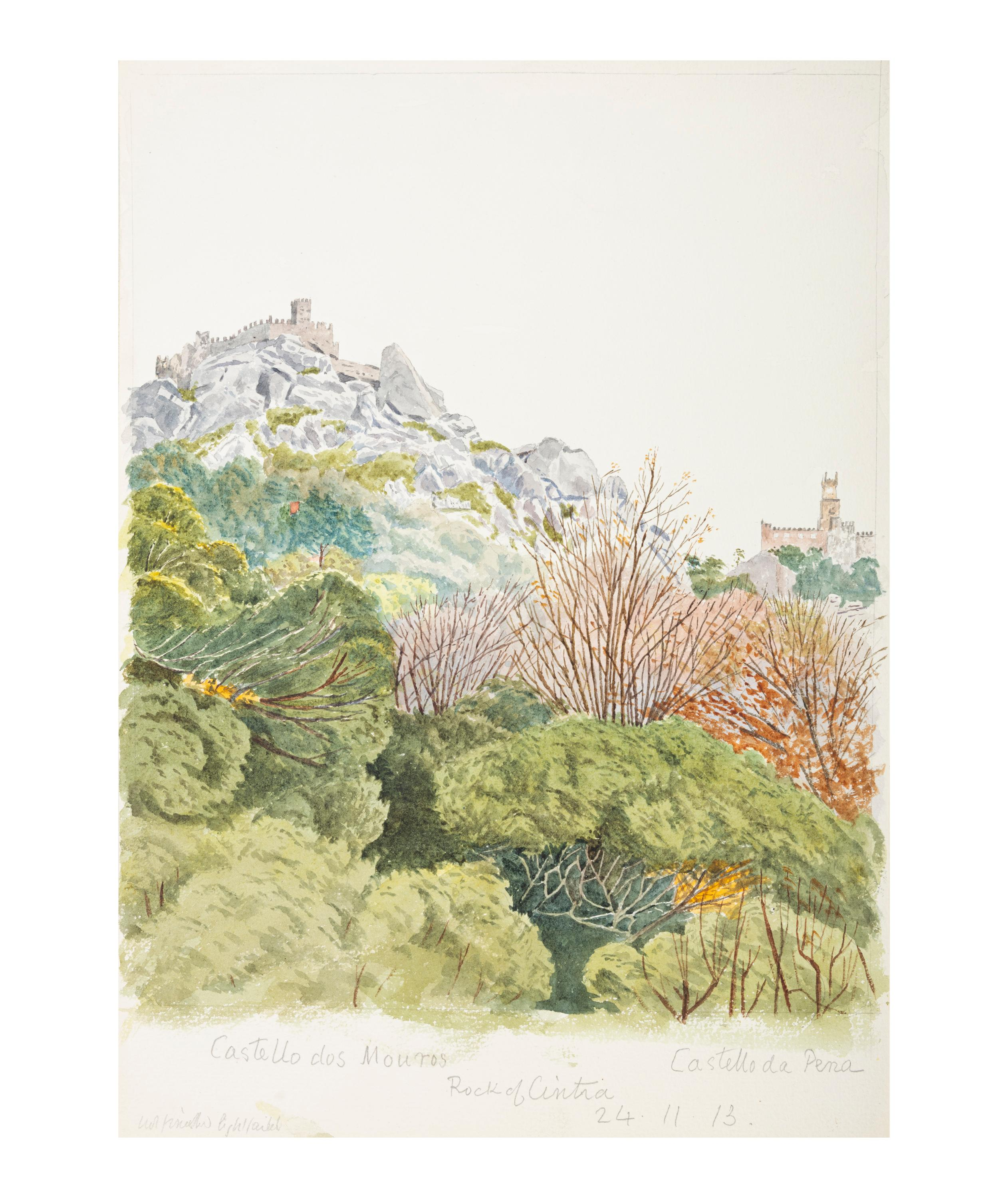
Watercolour sketch by Henry Bruen

Henry Bruen (26 July 1856 – 26 December 1927) was an Irish first-class cricketer and British Army officer. He also painted watercolour sketches, largely of scenes from his travels.

The son of the politician Henry Bruen and his wife, Mary Margaret Conolly, he was born at the family estate Oak Park in County Carlow. He was educated in England at Harrow School, before attending the Royal Military Academy, Woolwich. He graduated from Woolwich in February 1877, entering into the Royal Artillery with the temporary rank of lieutenant. His commission to lieutenant was made permanent in March 1878. Bruen later toured North America in September 1885 with a team formed by the Devon amateur E. J. Sanders, making two first-class appearances on the tour against the Gentlemen of Philadelphia at Germantown. He met with success in his second first-class match of the tour, taking figures of 6 for 54 with the ball in the Gentlemen of Philadelphia second-innings. The following year he married Agnes Mary MacMorrough Kavanagh, the daughter of Arthur MacMurrough Kavanagh, with the couple having one son. In the same year he served as the High Sheriff of Carlow, and later served as the High Sheriff of Wexford in 1909. Bruen died at Oak Park in December 1927.
