= Alexander Raphael =

British politician (1775–1850)

Alexander Raphael MP

Member of Parliament for St Albans
- In office 1847–1850
- Preceded by: Benjamin Bond Cabbell
- Succeeded by: Jacob Bell

Member of Parliament for Carlow
- In office June 1835 – 19 August 1835

Personal details
- Born: 1775 Madras, India
- Died: 1850 (aged 74–75)
- Party: Whig

Alexander Raphael (1775–1850) was a British politician who was the first British-Armenian to serve in the House of Commons. He was returned as a Whig MP from the Irish constituency of County Carlow, at a by-election in June 1835. However the election was challenged on petition and he was unseated on 19 August 1835. Raphael succeeded in re-entering the House of Commons as a Catholic Whig from St Albans in 1847 and retained the seat until his death.

Prior to serving in Parliament, he had been Sheriff of London for 1834, where he lost the tip of his left index finger in a fight with a criminal.

== Early life ==
Raphael was born in Madras, India to father Edward Raphael, a founder of Carniac Bank who died in 1791, and mother Maria Stephana Manuel, who died in 1790. He was baptised as a Catholic. His father was reportedly descended from Armenians (surnamed either Gharamiants or Kharan) who moved to New Julfa, Iran in the mid-17th century and then Madras. Raphael was tutored by Father Nicholas Pusani.

== Legacy ==
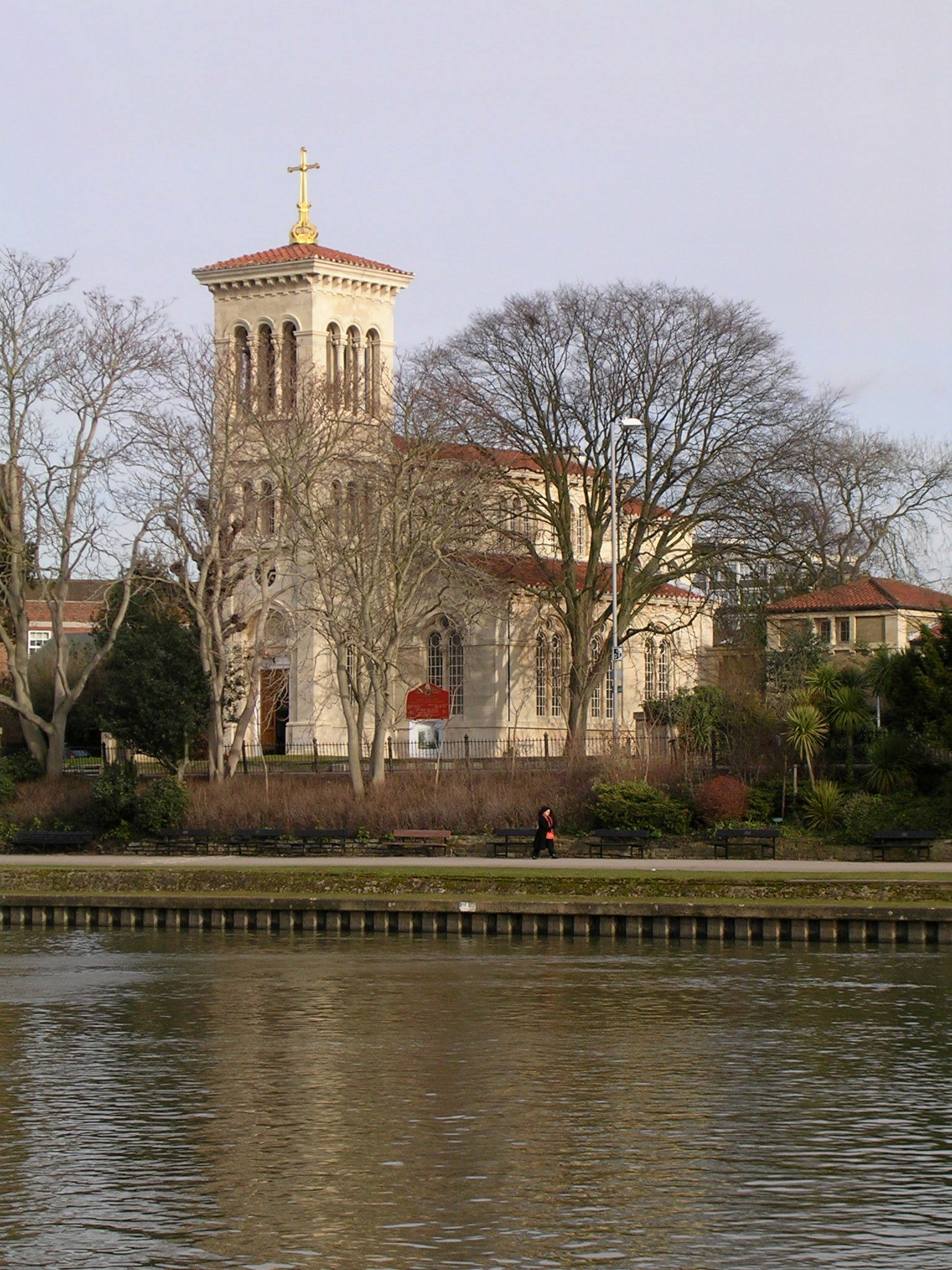
St Raphael's Church, Surbiton

His legacy is St Raphael's Church in Surbiton, London, which he financed and had built as a family chapel. Completed in 1848, only two years before his death, it was later opened to the public as a Roman Catholic church by his nephew, Edward.

Parliament of the United Kingdom
Preceded by Thomas Kavanagh; Henry Bruen	Member of Parliament for County Carlow; 1835; With: Nicholas Aylward Vigors	Succeeded by Henry Bruen; Thomas Kavanagh
Preceded by Benjamin Bond Cabbell; George Repton	Member of Parliament for St Albans; 1847 – 1850; With: George Repton	Succeeded by Jacob Bell; George Repton
