= Francis Bruen =

British politician

Francis Bruen (died 15 December 1867) was an Irish Conservative Party politician. He was Member of Parliament (MP) for Carlow from 1835 to 1837, and briefly in 1839, taking his seat in the House of Commons of what was then the United Kingdom of Great Britain and Ireland.

Bruen first stood for Parliament at the 1832 general election, in Carlow Borough, but did not win the seat. He was successful on his second attempt in 1835, when he defeated Nicholas Vigors, Carlow's Liberal Repealer MP. At the 1837 general election, he was defeated by another Liberal, William Henry Maule. In 1839, Maule was appointed as a Baron of the Court of the Exchequer (a type of judge), and on 27 February 1839, Bruen won the resulting by-election by 167 votes to 164. However, the result was overturned after an electoral petition, and the result was amended to 159 votes for Bruen and 160 for his Liberal opponent, Thomas Gisborne. He did not stand again.

== Family ==
Francis was the sixth and youngest child of Colonel Henry Bruen (1741–1795) and his wife Dorothea Henrietta Knox. (His date of birth is listed in one source as 1800, but it seems improbable that he was born five years after the death of his father, which is listed by Rayment as 14 December 1795.) In 1823, Francis married Catherine Anne Nugent, daughter of George Nugent, the 7th Earl of Westmeath and Lady Elizabeth Emily Moore. They had no children.

Bruen's family were prominent in County Carlow. His father had been a member of the pre-Act of Union Parliament of Ireland, for Jamestown and for Carlow. His elder brother Henry (1789–1852), was an MP for County Carlow for most of the period from 1812 to 1852, and Henry's son Henry Bruen (1828–1912), was MP for County Carlow from 1857 to 1880. The family had lived since 1775 in Oak Park estate, near Carlow town; Francis lived in Coolbawn, County Wexford.

He was at some point a Deputy Lieutenant of County Wexford, and was also a Justice of the Peace for County Wexford.

Parliament of the United Kingdom
Preceded by Nicholas Aylward Vigors	Member of Parliament for Carlow; 1835 – 1837	Succeeded by William Henry Maule
Preceded by William Henry Maule	Member of Parliament for Carlow; 1839	Succeeded by Thomas Gisborne
