= Walter Kavanagh (cricketer) =

Irish cricketer

Walter Kavanagh (20 March 1814 – 19 June 1836) was an Irish cricketer who played in three first-class cricket matches for Cambridge University and the Marylebone Cricket Club in 1834. He was born at Borris, County Carlow, Ireland and died in England, though the precise location is not known.

Kavanagh was the eldest son of Thomas Kavanagh, Member of Parliament for County Carlow and head of a family that could trace its lineage back to the hereditary kings of Leinster. He was educated at Eton College and Trinity College, Cambridge, and he played for Eton in the Eton v Harrow cricket matches of 1832 and 1833.

As a cricketer, he played as a lower-middle-order batsman and he also took a wicket in two of his three first-class matches, though full figures for his games are not available, and he may have taken more; his best batting, an innings of 27 which was the top score for his team, came in his first match for Cambridge University against the Cambridge Town Club.
