= Nicholas Aylward Vigors =

Irish zoologist and politician (1785–1840)

Nicholas Aylward Vigors FRS
- Born: 1785; Old Leighlin, County Carlow, Ireland
- Died: 26 October 1840 (aged 54–55); London
- Education: Trinity College, Oxford; Lincoln's Inn
- Known for: Description of 110 species of birds
- Scientific career
- Fields: Ornithology, Member of Parliament
- Author abbrev. (zoology): Vigors

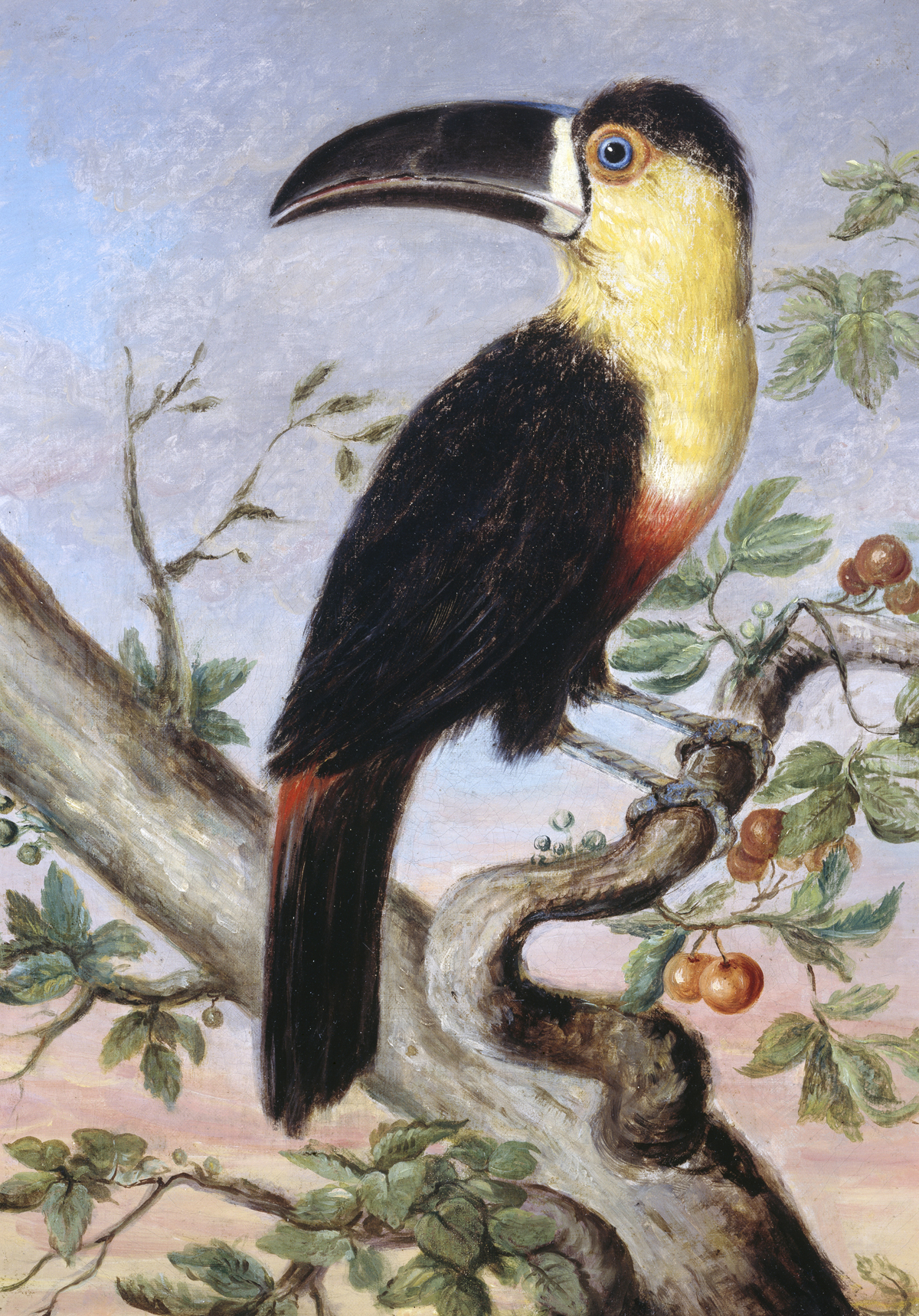
Painting, oil on canvas, of a toucan by Vigors, 1831

Nicholas Aylward Vigors FRS (1785 – 26 October 1840) was an Irish zoologist and politician. He was known to popularize the classification of birds on the basis of the quinarian system.

== Early life ==
Vigors was born at Old Leighlin, County Carlow, in 1785. He was the first son of Capt. Nicholas Aylward Vigors, who served in the 29th (Worcestershire) Regiment, and his first wife, Catherine Vigors, daughter of Solomon Richards of Solsborough. He matriculated at Trinity College, Oxford, in November 1803, and was admitted at Lincoln's Inn in November 1806. Without completing his studies, he served in the army during the Peninsular War from 1809 to 1811 and was wounded in the Battle of Barossa on 5 March 1811. Though he had not yet completed his studies, he still published "An inquiry into the nature and extent of poetick licence" in London in 1810. He then returned to Oxford to continue his studies and achieved his Bachelor of Arts in 1817 and Master of Arts in 1818. He practiced as a barrister and became a Doctor of Civil Law in 1832.

== Zoology ==
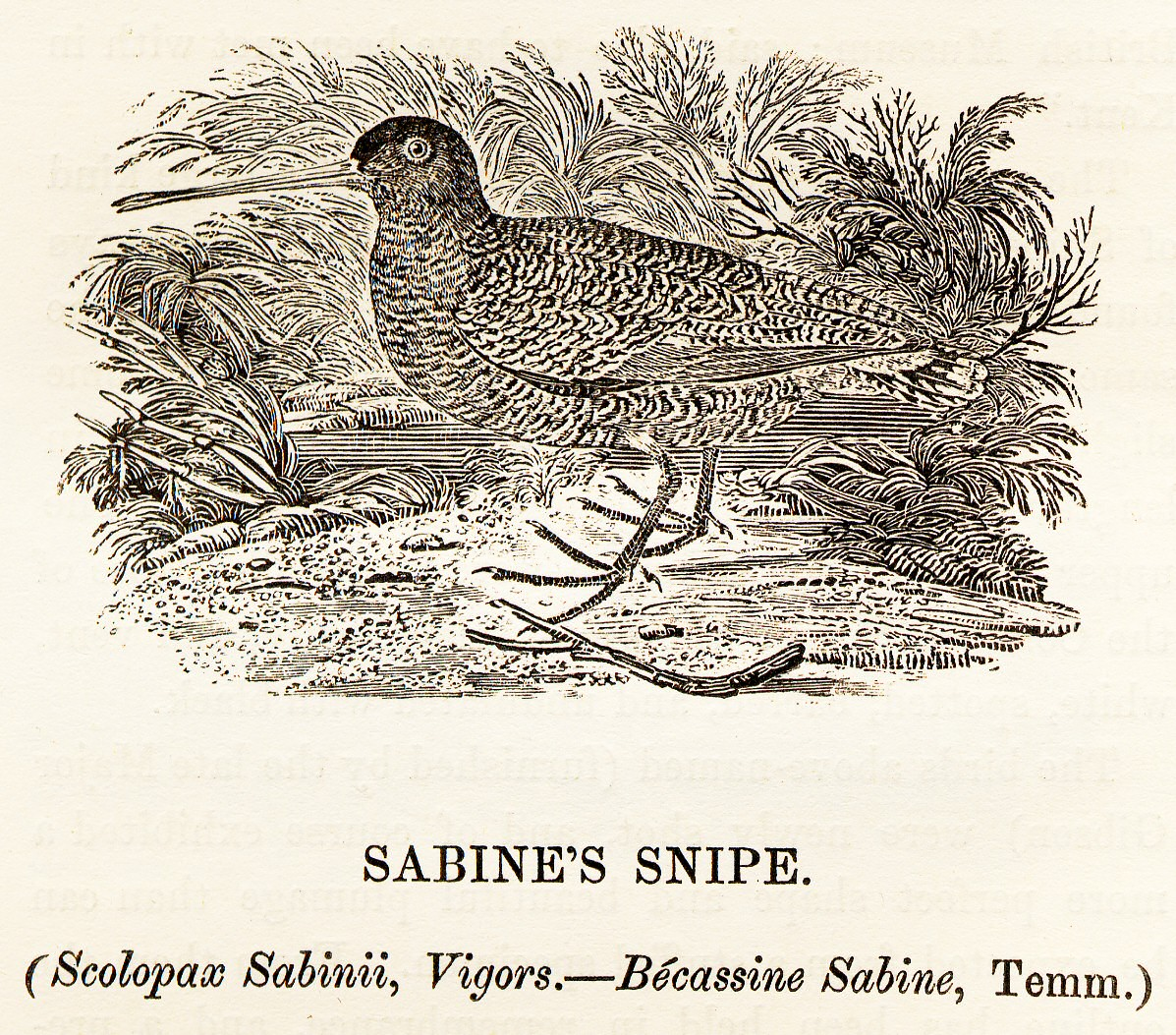
Vigors described the "Sabine's snipe", shown here in a woodcut from Bewick's British Birds, in 1825.

Vigors was a co-founder of the Zoological Society of London in 1826, and its first secretary until 1833. In that year, he founded what became the Royal Entomological Society of London. He was a fellow of the Linnean Society and the Royal Society. He was the author of 40 papers, mostly on ornithology. He described 110 species of birds, enough to rank him among the top 30 bird authors historically. He provided the text for John Gould's A Century of Birds from the Himalaya Mountains (1830–32).

One bird that he described was "Sabine's snipe". This was treated as a common snipe by Barrett-Hamilton in 1895 and by Meinertzhagen in 1926 but was thought to be probably a Wilson's snipe in 1945. Vigors lent a skin for later editions of Thomas Bewick's History of British Birds.

== Politics ==
Vigors succeeded to his father's estate in 1828. He was MP for the borough of Carlow from 1832 until 1835. He briefly represented County Carlow in 1835. Vigors had been elected in a by-election in June after the Conservative MPs originally returned at the 1835 United Kingdom general election were unseated on petition and a new writ issued. On 19 August 1835, Vigors and his running mate, in the two-member county constituency, were unseated on petition. The same two Conservatives who had previously been unseated were awarded the seats. On the death of one of them, Vigors won the subsequent by-election in 1837 and retained the seat until his own death.

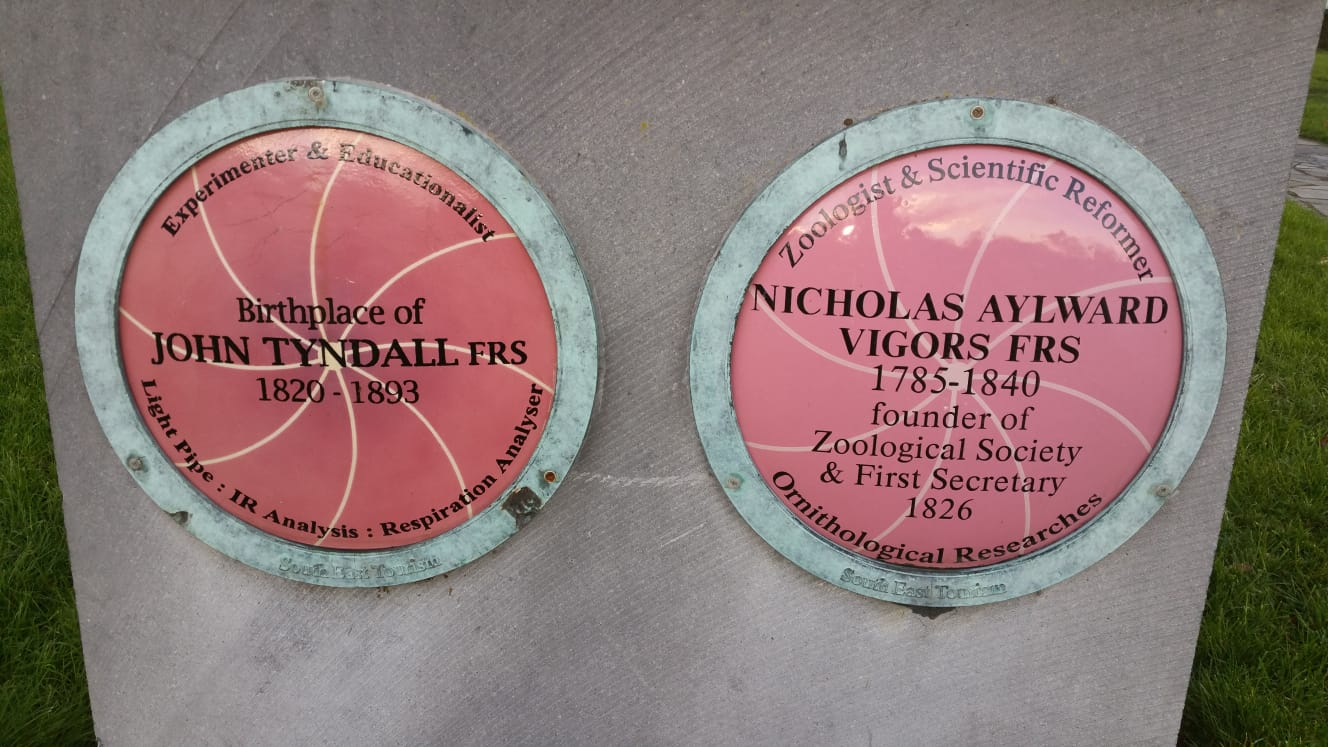
Plaques to Vigors and John Tyndall in Leighlinbridge

== Bibliography ==
- Kavanagh, P. J. (1983). "Nicholas Aylward Vigors, MP, 1786-1840". Carloviana: Journal of the Old Carlow Society. 30: 15–19.
- Parliamentary Election Results in Ireland, 1801-1922, edited by B.M. Walker (Royal Irish Academy 1978)

Parliament of the United Kingdom
Preceded by Lord Tullamore	Member of Parliament for Carlow; 1832–1835	Succeeded by Francis Bruen
Preceded by Henry Bruen; Thomas Kavanagh	Member of Parliament for County Carlow; 1835; With: Alexander Raphael	Succeeded by Thomas Kavanagh; Henry Bruen
Preceded by Thomas Kavanagh; Henry Bruen	Member of Parliament for County Carlow; 1837–1840; With: Alexander Raphael	Succeeded by Thomas Kavanagh; Henry Bruen
Professional and academic associations
New institution	Secretary of the Zoological Society of London; 1829–1833	Succeeded by Edward Turner Bennett
