= 1891 County Carlow by-election =

UK parliamentary by-election

The 1891 County Carlow by-election was a parliamentary by-election held for the United Kingdom House of Commons constituency of County Carlow on 7 July 1891. It arose as a result of the death of the sitting member, James Patrick Mahon.

== Background ==
The by-election took place at a crucial moment in the history of the Irish Nationalist party. After a public scandal in which it was revealed that its leader, Charles Stewart Parnell, was living in a relationship with Katharine O'Shea, wife of one of his party MPs, and had three children by her, the party split, the Anti-Parnellite majority leaving to form the Irish National Federation, while the Parnellite minority continued as the Irish National League. By-elections offered the two sides an opportunity to test their support among the general population. Anti-Parnellite candidates had been successful in North Kilkenny and in North Sligo; a third loss would represent a crushing blow to Parnell's supporters.

== Campaign ==
The Parnellites were positive about their prospects. Parnell, who had just married the now-divorced Katherine, told the Times in an interview that this was the first by-election since the crisis had arisen that he had any prospect of winning; Bagenalstown, in the west of the county, was considered a Parnellite stronghold.

John Hammond

On 23 June the Anti-Parnellite campaign nominated their candidate: John Hammond, Chairman of Carlow Town Commissioners. The next day, the Parnellites nominated Andrew Kettle, a founder of the Irish Land League.

At the start, there were signs that it might be a quiet campaign. The Times declared that 'it will be hard for either party to infuse any real fighting spirit into it'. The choice of Mr Kettle, it declared, 'is not looked upon as providing a strong candidate whose selection indicates confidence and determination'. Hammond, on the other hand, was 'regarded as a half-hearted Nationalist, a mild specimen of the patriot who was on too good terms with the minority to be implicitly trusted in the day of trial'. The campaign, it announced, 'is at present slow and spirited'.

Parnell, in contrast to recent by-elections, ran a studiously moderate campaign. On 28 June he arrived in Carlow and addressed a large crowd at the Town Hall. There were reports that a Parnellite group had been stoned on the outskirts of the town, but there were no other disturbances.

The next day, Parnell spoke at Bagenalstown, and addressed the issue of how his personal life affected his public responsibilities:

Mr Parnell said certain faults were alleged against him, but even his enemies had not been able to allege faults against his public life and his public conduct of the Irish movement. As regards any private faults that were alleged against him, they were of a very ancient date. ... If the private faults which were alleged against him did not prevent him from doing his duty to Ireland in 1883 and 1885, why should they prevent him from doing his duty to Ireland to-day?

On the same day, Tim Healy MP addressed an Anti-Parnellite meeting. "Could there be anything in Carlow of the nature of a contest were it not for Kitty O'Parnell?" he asked, to laughter and cheers. "They had no means of getting rid of English dictation except by the aid of the English democracy".

On 1 July, Parnell spoke to an enthusiastic crowd at Hacketstown, described as 'entirely Parnellite'. A later meeting in Rathvilly, however, was attended by 'hooting, groaning and beating of tin cans', and the return to Carlow town was described as 'undemonstrative and chilling'. Healy and Hammond, meanwhile, were well received at Leighlinbridge.

The Parnellite campaign suffered a major setback on the next day, when the leadership of the Roman Catholic church, who had been quiet on the issue to that point, issued a letter stating that Parnell "has utterly disqualified himself to be the political leader" of the Irish people, and calling on them to repudiate his leadership. The letter was signed by all of the Archbishops and Bishops with the exception of Dr O'Dwyer of Limerick. The 'open hostility to ecclesiastical authority' of some of his supporters was cited as an important factor in their decision. At the same time, Bernard O'Neill, Parish priest of Bagenalstown, made clear that as one of those who had nominated Kettle, he urged his parishioners to vote for him.

The Anti-Parnellites made much of the opposing candidate's name. Kettle was described as 'a utensil' for Parnell, prepared to 'boil over' if necessary. They used kettles in demonstrations to make noise and drown out their opponent's speeches. An effigy of Katherine O'Shea holding a kettle was suspended from a tree, and a dead fox hung out with a kettle tied to its tail.

In the closing days, heated divisions were apparent. Parnell was well received at Fenagh but driven out of Ballon with 'shouts, execrations, and the beating of kettles'. A fight broke out between supporters of the two sides who passed on the road near Tullow. The groups 'engaged each other with stones and sticks for several minutes. ... The missiles and bludgeons were used to such effect that blood flowed freely, and the Anti-Parnellites were eventually forced to retreat." By now, the Times was reporting that, while Parnell continued to predict victory, his supporters appeared less confident and were talking of their determination to fight on even if defeated.

== Voting ==
Polling day was reported as quiet, apart from two attempts to assault Parnell, and one alleged case of personation. Kettle's supporter, Father O'Neill, protested that one of his curates was acting as a personation agent for Hammond; his three curates, defending their support for the Anti-Parnellite candidate, produced a letter from the local bishop, urging O'Neill to abstain from campaigning and allow them to promote the Anti-Parnellite cause.

The result was an emphatic victory for the Anti-Parnellites, with Hammond receiving 3,747 votes as against just 1,532 for Kettle, a majority of 2,215. Seeing how well they could do in one of the strongest Parnellite seats, his opponents now calculated that they would win all but three of the Nationalist constituencies in a general election. For the Parnellites, it was a heavy blow, described by the Freeman's Journal as 'far and away larger than anyone could have anticipated'. Parnell died just three months later.

== Result ==
1891 County Carlow by-election
Party	Candidate	Votes	%	±%
Irish National Federation	John Hammond	3,755	70.9	N/A
Irish National League	Andrew Kettle	1,539	29.1	N/A
Majority		2,216	41.8	N/A
Turnout		5,294	75.5	N/A
Registered electors		7,016		
Irish National Federation gain from Irish Parliamentary		Swing	N/A	
