= Walter Bagenal (1762–1814) =

Irish politician

Walter Bagenal (c 1762 – 18 June 1814) was an Irish politician who sat in the House of Commons of the United Kingdom from 1802 to 1812.

He was elected at the 1802 general election as one of the two Members of Parliament (MPs) for County Carlow. He was re-elected unopposed in 1806 and 1807, but was defeated at the 1812 general election.

Parliament of the United Kingdom
Preceded by Sir Richard Butler, Bt; William Henry Burton	Member of Parliament for County Carlow; 1802 – 1812; With: David Latouche	Succeeded by David Latouche; Henry Bruen
