= Monte Pelmo =

Mountain in Italy

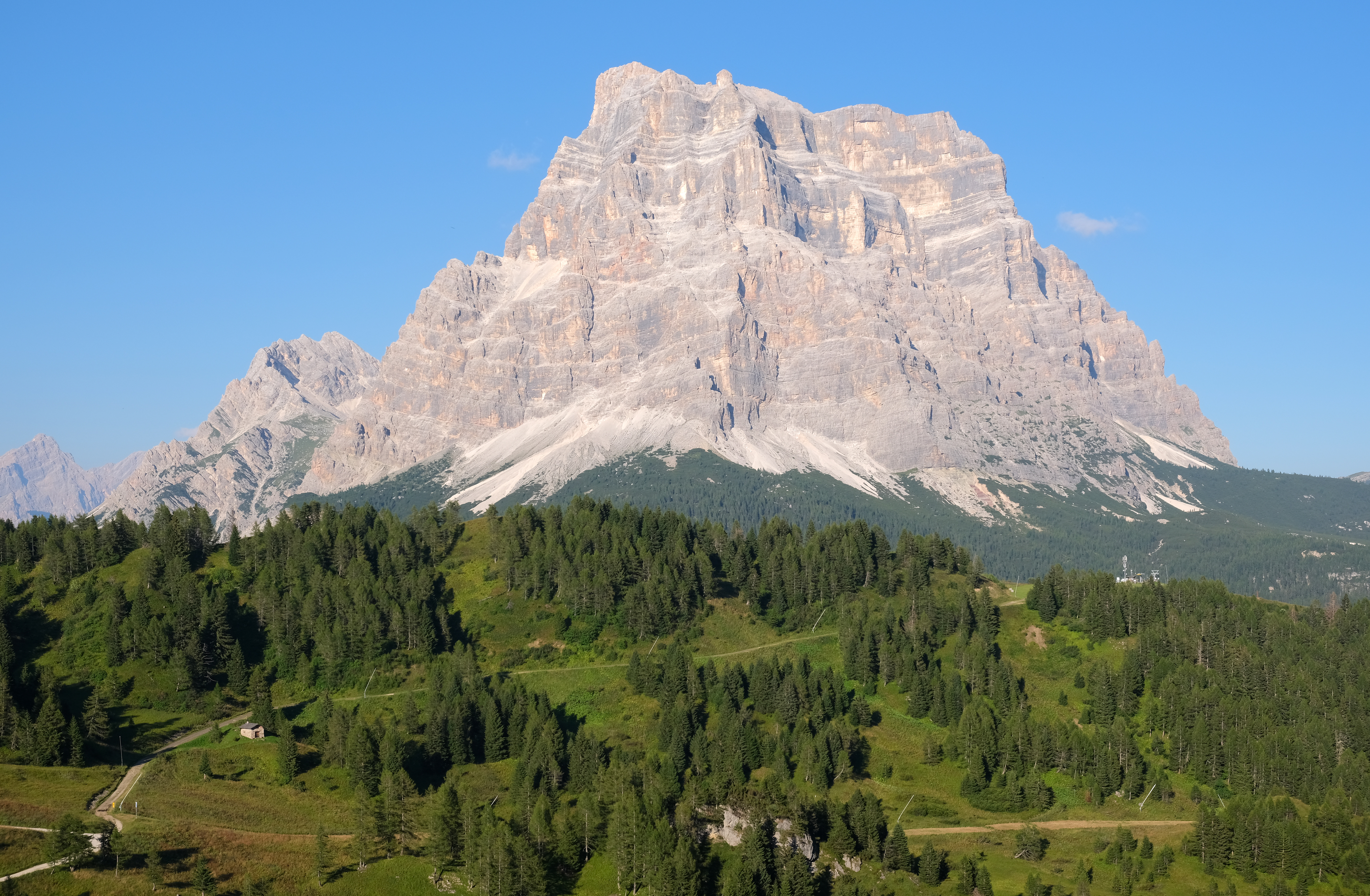
- Monte Pelmo seen from Monte Crot

Highest point
- Elevation: 3,168 m (10,394 ft)
- Prominence: 1,191 m (3,907 ft)
- Isolation: 7.56 km (4.70 mi)
- Listing: Alpine mountains above 3000 m
- Coordinates: 46°25′11″N 12°8′5″E

Geography
- Location within Alps
- Location: Veneto, Italy
- Parent range: Dolomites

Climbing
- First ascent: September 19th, 1857 by John Ball

Monte Pelmo is a mountain of the Dolomites, in the province of Belluno, Northeastern Italy.

The mountain resembles a giant block which stands isolated from other peaks, so can be seen clearly from the neighbouring valleys and from nearby mountains such as Antelao and Monte Civetta.

Monte Pelmo was the first major Dolomite peak to be climbed; Irishman John Ball, who later became president of the UK's Alpine Club, succeeded in his ascent in 1857. He set out with a chamois hunter from the Boitevalley towards Monte Pelmo. Over the long ledge named after Ball, which the chamois hunters refused to cross, Ball got into the large cirque, through which he climbed over the small Pelmo glacier to below the summit structure.

West of the summit lies a secondary peak, Pelmetto (meaning "Little Pelmo" in Italian), at 2,990m high, which has a 1,100-metre (3,609 ft) high north face.

There are only a few possibilities for climbing the peak, owing to its unique structure. The best known (and easiest) ascent leads over the south-east flank. The route of the first climbers still offers a rewarding but long and strenuous mountain tour in the second degree of difficulty. Problems can be found with the above-mentioned, exposed ball band. Climbing skills and surefootedness are necessary. The ascent of Monte Pelmo should also be carried out in safe weather and without snow.

On some rocks on its western side people can admire dinosaurs prints (Sign "Orme di Dinosauri"). These are the traces of at least three dinosaurs that are approx. 220 million years old. From the path to the tracks you walk steeply uphill for about half an hour.

This mountain is nicknamed "God's armchair" because its shape looks like a huge armchair.

== Gallery ==
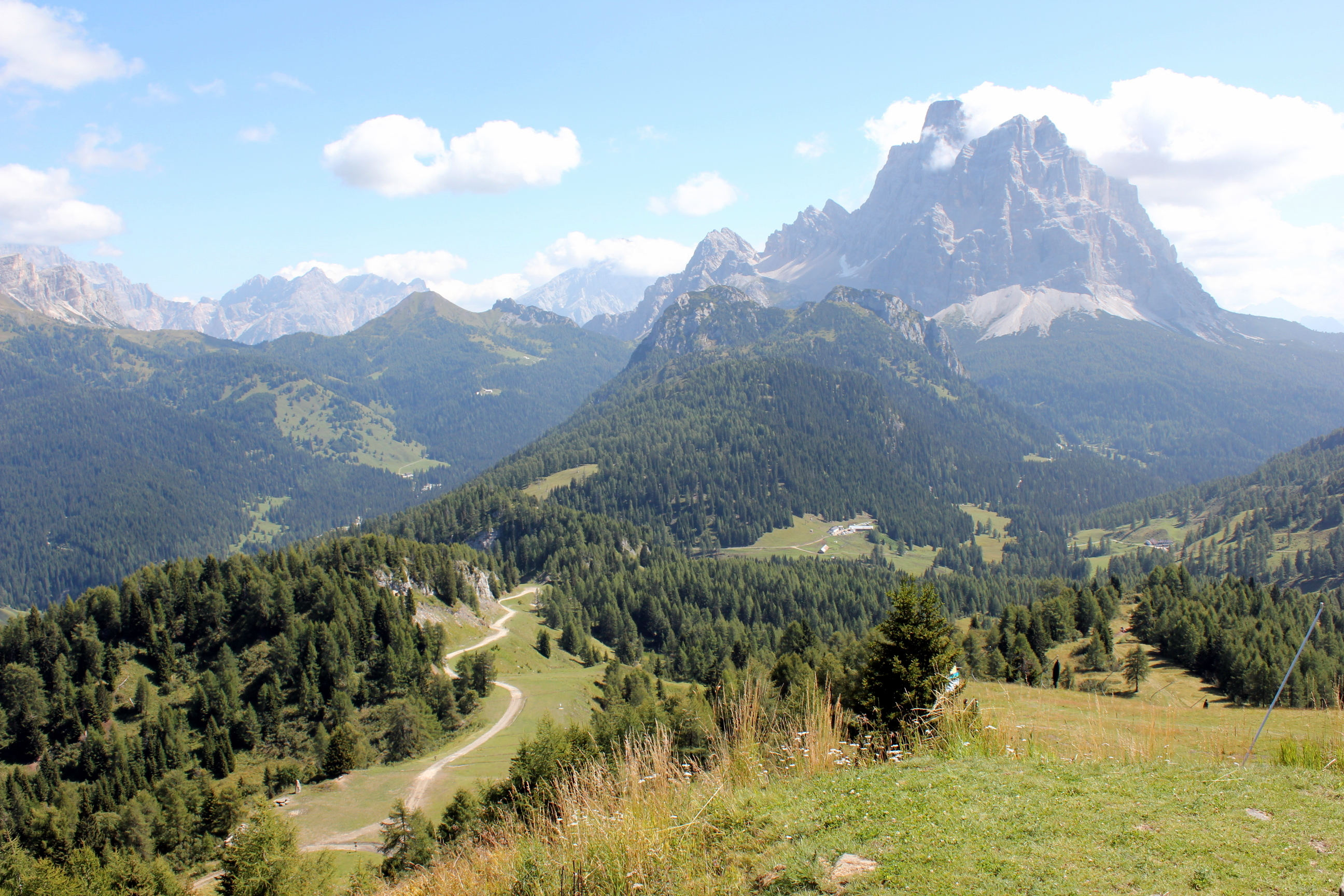
Monte Pelmo

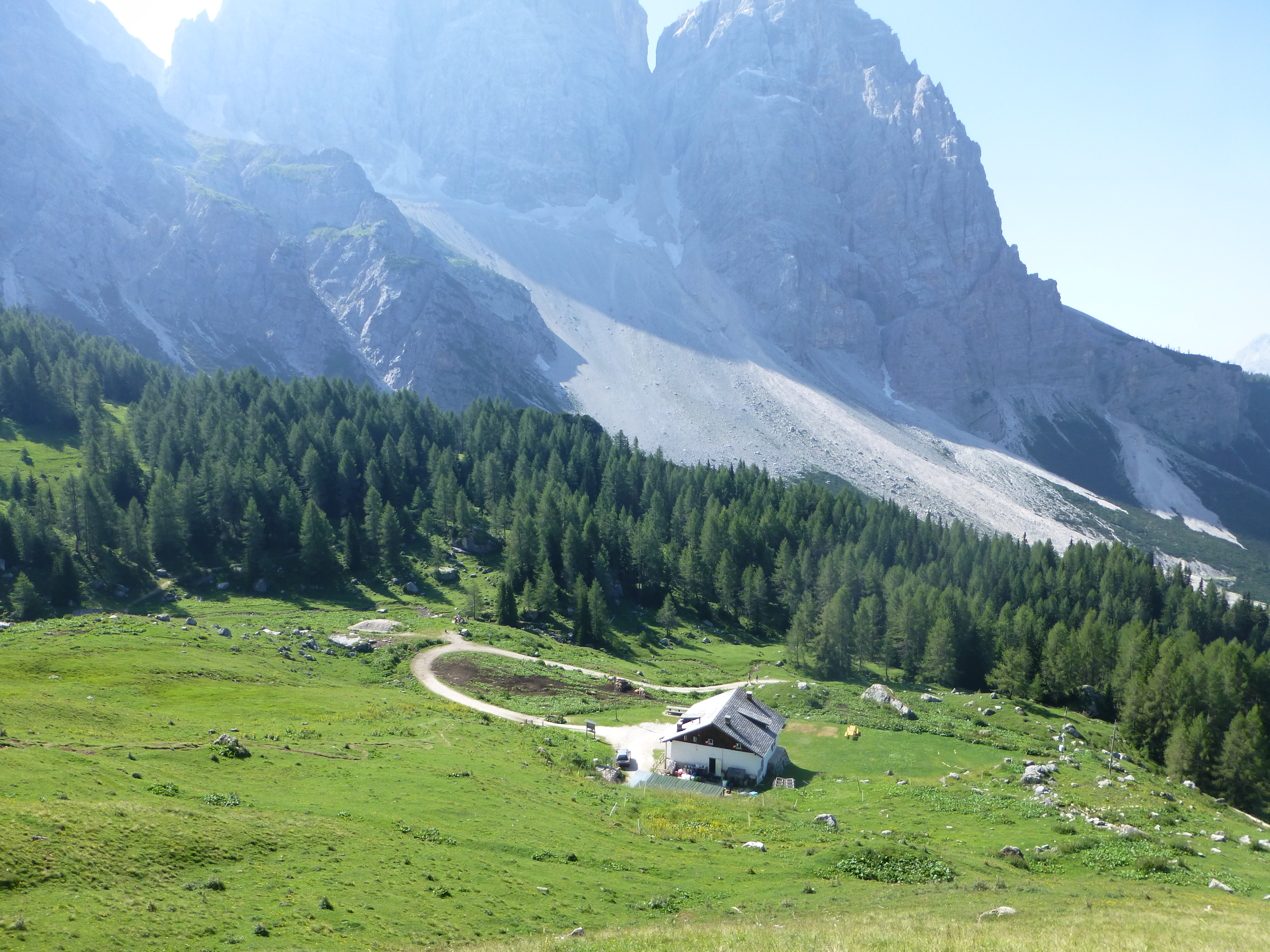
Refugee Città di Fiume with Monte Pelmo

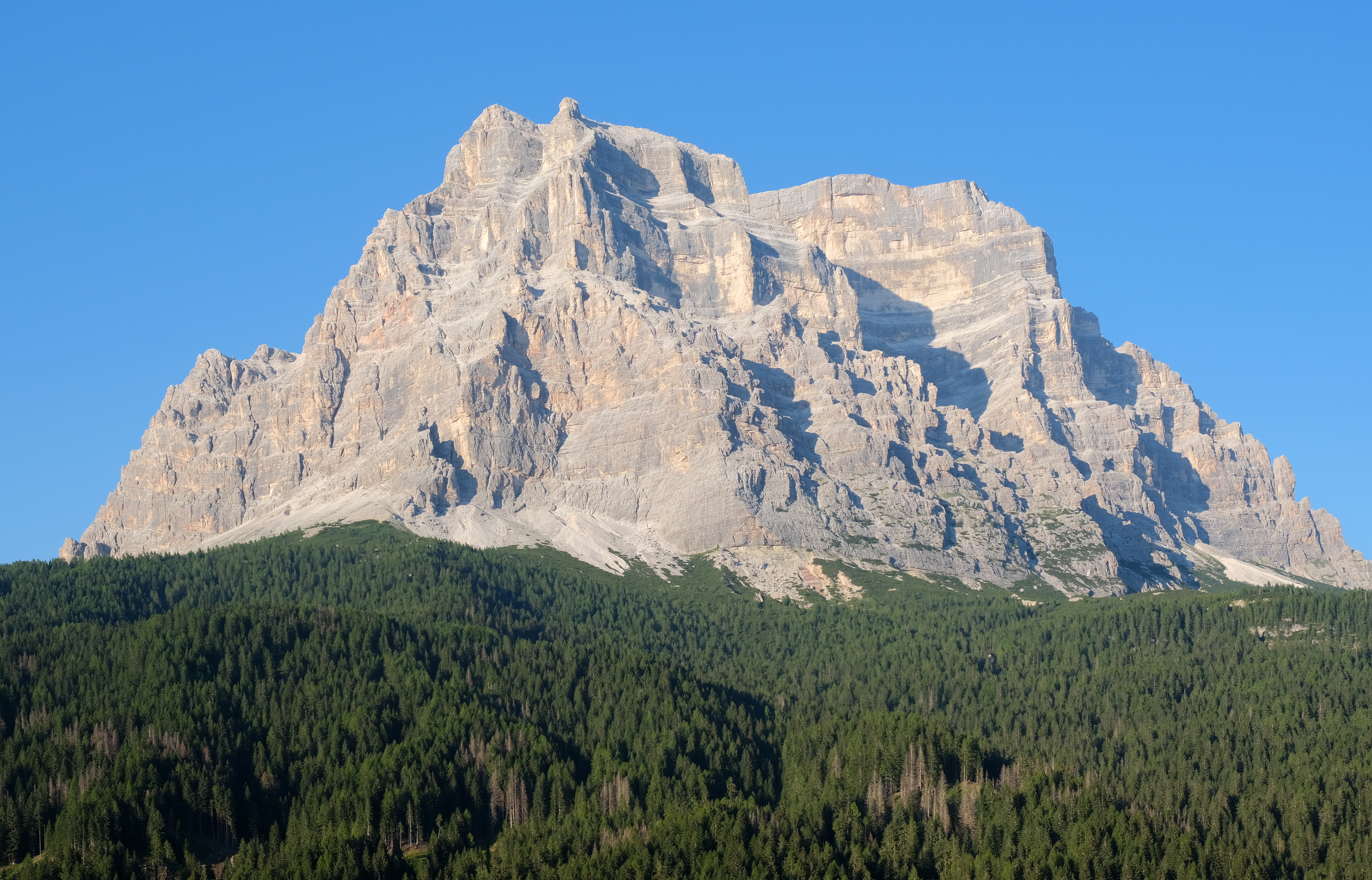
Pelmo seen from Palafavera

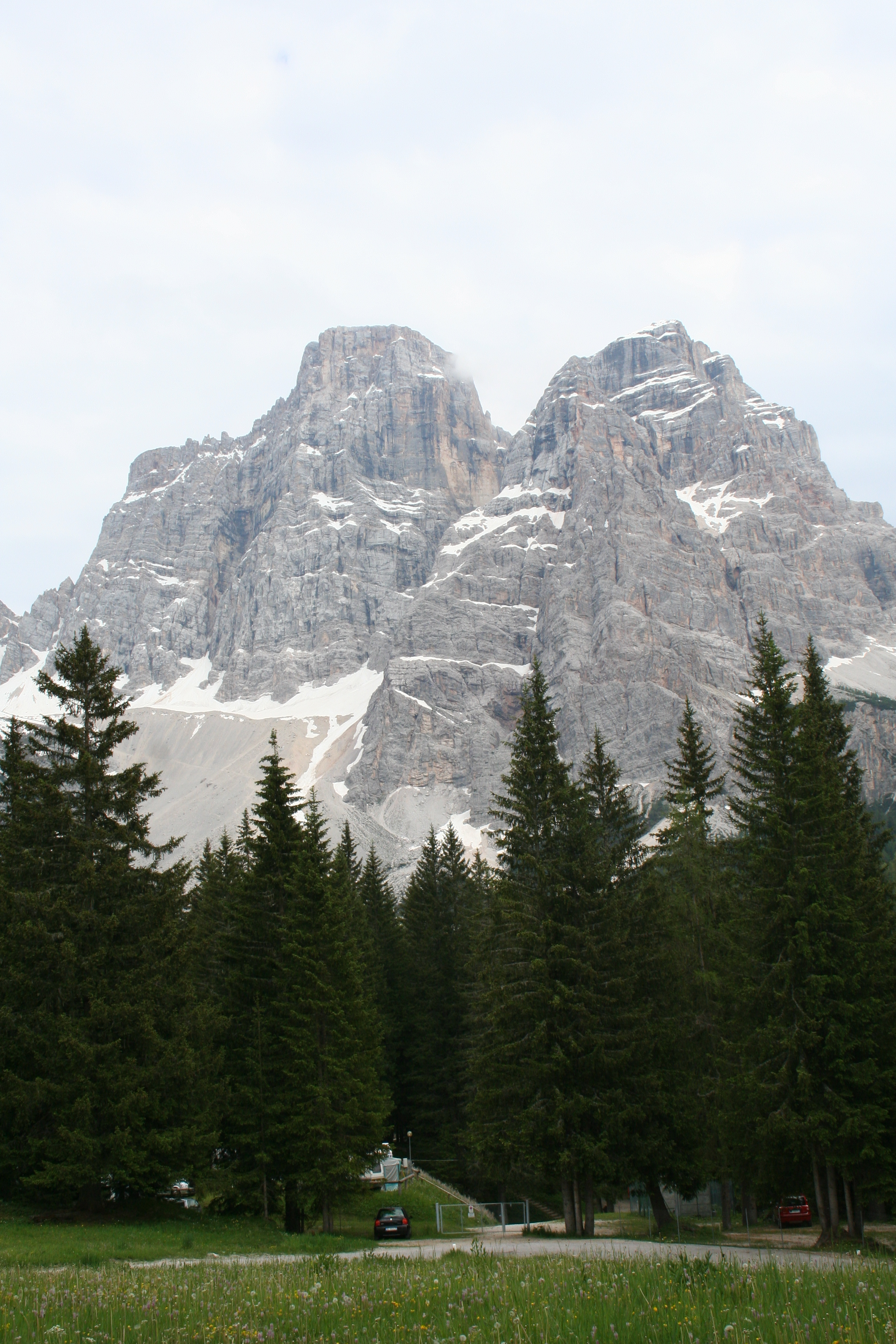
Monte Pelmo and Pelmetto

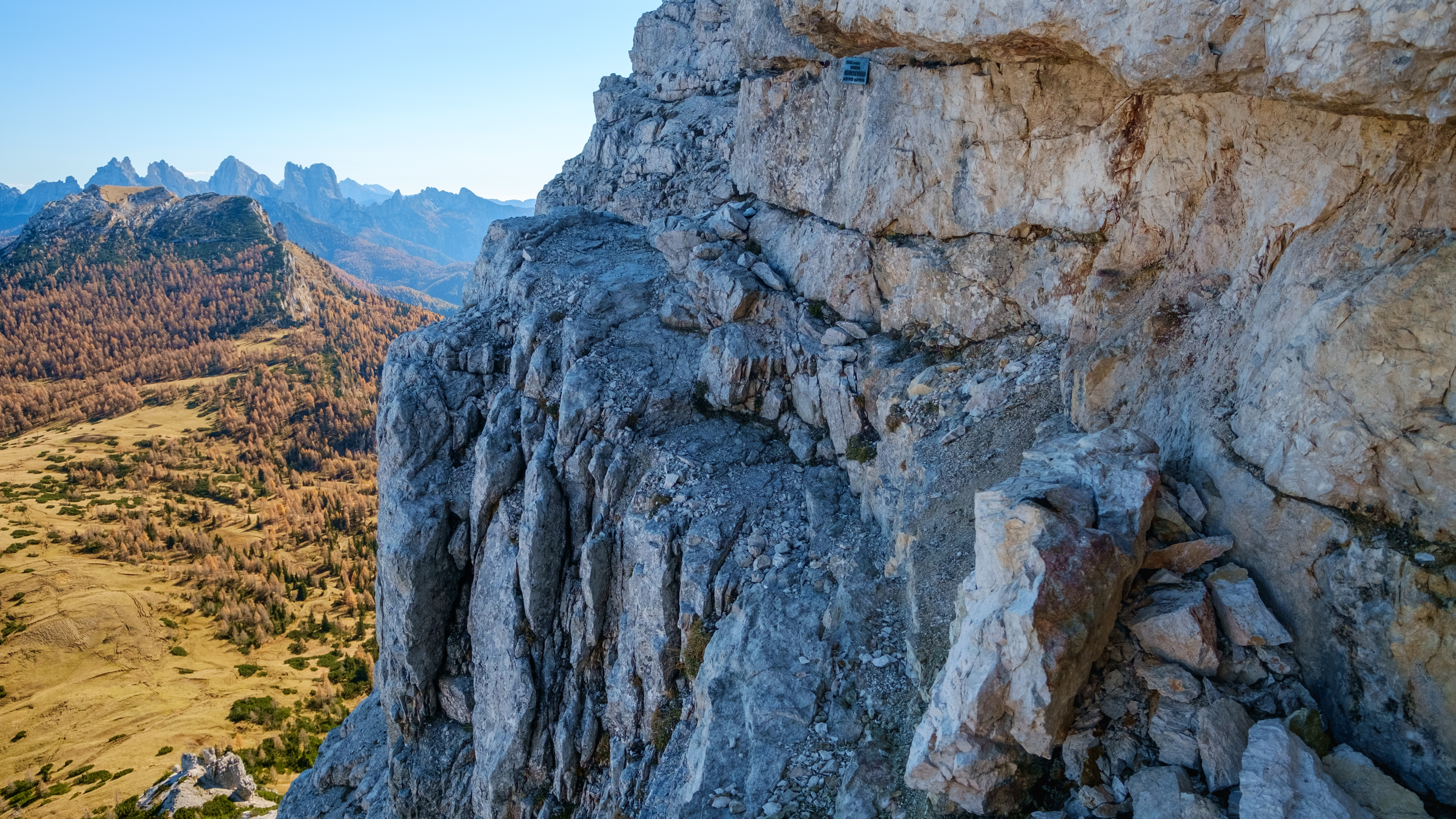
Climb to Monte Pelmo

animation

== See also ==
- Golden age of alpinism
- Silver age of alpinism
