= Donald Horne Macfarlane =

Sir Donald Horne Macfarlane (July 1830 – 2 June 1904) was a Scottish merchant who entered politics and became a Member of Parliament (MP), firstly as a Home Rule League MP in Ireland and then as Liberal and Crofters Party MP in Scotland.

Macfarlane was born in Scotland, the youngest son of Allan Macfarlane, J.P., of Caithness and his wife Margaret Horne. He became an East Indies merchant as a tea trader and indigo plantation owner. While in India he was a passionate amateur photographer. He experimented freely and produced semi-abstract images.

At the 1880 general election Macfarlane was elected as a Home Rule Member of Parliament for County Carlow. The Carlow constituency lost one of its two seats under the Redistribution of Seats Act 1885, and at the 1885 general election Macfarlane stood instead for the Crofters Party in Argyllshire. He won the seat, but lost it in 1886. He was re-elected (by a narrow margin) at the 1892 general elections as a Liberal/Crofters candidate, holding it until a further defeat in 1895. He was knighted in the 1894 New Year Honours.

Macfarlane married Mary Isabella Bagshawe in 1857 in India; she was the daughter of Henry Bagshawe. She predeceased him in 1887. They had one son, George Macfarlane. The following year he married Fanny Worswick Robson (1842–1943).

Parliament of the United Kingdom
Preceded by Henry Bruen; Arthur MacMurrough Kavanagh	Member of Parliament for County Carlow; 1880–1885; With: Edmund Dwyer Gray	Succeeded by Edmund Dwyer Gray
Preceded by Lord Colin Campbell	Member of Parliament for Argyllshire; 1885–1886	Succeeded by John Malcolm
Preceded by John Malcolm	Member of Parliament for Argyllshire; 1892–1895	Succeeded by Donald Nicol
