= Alberto Parolini =

Alberto Parolini (24 June 1788 – 15 January 1867) was an Italian naturalist, botanist and founder of a botanical garden in Bassano del Grappa that was later called the Giardino Parolini. He had nearly 3000 species of plants in 1829. The lichen Arthopyrenia parolinii is named after him. The pine species Pinus parolinii from Turkey was named after him, although it is now a synonym.

== Life and work ==
Portrait painting

Parolini came from a noble family in Borgo Leon, Bassano, son of Francesco Parolini of Bassano del Grappa and Elisabetta Savioni of Venice, and became interested in nature at an early age. He found a mentor in Giambattista Brocchi.His mother died when he was four and father died in 1815, after which he inherited the estate. He began a collection of plants at his fathers farm in 1805 and he expanded it with new land in 1822. He travelled around Europe, met botanists and naturalists, and collected new plant species for his garden. He spent a lot of time in London and hosted Mary and William Somerville who he met in Paris. The Somervilles returned to England and helped induct Parolini as a foreign member of the Geological Society of London. He travelled to Asia Minor along with the English botanist Philip Barker-Webb in 1820-21. He collected a pine that was described as a new species and named after him as Pinus parolinii by Roberto de Visiani. He also had a herbarium and a collection of minerals which included the collections of his mentor Brocchi. In 1829 the botanical garden held nearly 3000 species of plants.

Parolini married Giulio Londonio and their daughter Elisa married the Irish botanist John Ball. His daughter Antonietta maintained the gardens until 1879. His botanical garden was transferred to the Municipality of Bassano in 1929.
