= Denis Pack-Beresford (politician) =

Irish politician (1818–1881)

Denis Pack-Beresford MP

Member of Parliament for County Carlow
- In office 7 August 1862 – 18 November 1868 Serving with Henry Bruen
- Preceded by: William McClintock-Bunbury; Henry Bruen
- Succeeded by: Arthur MacMurrough Kavanagh; Henry Bruen

Personal details
- Born: Denis William Pack; 7 July 1818
- Died: 28 December 1881 (aged 63)
- Party: Conservative
- Spouse: Annette Caroline Browne (m. 1863)
- Children: Nine, including Denis Robert
- Parent(s): Denis Pack; Lady Elizabeth Louisa Beresford

Denis William Pack-Beresford (7 July 1818 – 28 December 1881), known as Denis William Pack until 1854, was an Irish Conservative Party politician.

== Early life and family ==
Pack was the son of decorated military officer Denis Pack and Elizabeth Louisa Beresford. In early life, Pack was a Captain of the Royal Artillery. Upon inheriting estates from his uncle, General William Carr Beresford, in 1854, he also inherited the arms of Beresford, and assumed the additional surname. In 1856, he became a High Sheriff.

Pack-Beresford then married Annette Caroline Browne, daughter of Robert Clayton Browne and Harriette Augusta Hamilton, in 1863. Together, they had nine children:

- Elizabeth Harriet Pack-Beresford (died 1937)
- Annette Louisa Pack-Beresford (died 1941)
- Denis Robert Pack-Beresford (1864–1942)
- Arthur William Pack-Beresford (1868–1902)
- Charles George Pack-Beresford (1869–1914), an officer in the West Kent Regiment.
- Henry John Pack-Beresford (1871–1945), an officer in the Highland Light Infantry
- Reynell James Pack-Beresford (1872–1949)
- Hugh de la Poer Pack-Beresford (1874–1954)
- Algernon Dunbar Pack-Beresford (1875–1908)

== Political career ==
He was elected as one of the two Members of Parliament (MPs) for County Carlow at a by-election in 1862 and held the seat until standing down at the 1868 general election.

== Later life ==
In later life, Pack-Beresford was a Deputy Lieutenant and Justice of the Peace.

== Arms ==
Coat of arms of Denis Pack-Beresford

Notes
Confirmed 26 March 1854 by Sir John Bernard Burke, Ulster King of Arms.
Crest
1st issuant from a mural crown Or a dragon's head per fess wavy Azure and Gules the lower part of the neck transfixed by a broken spear in the mouth the remaining part of the spear the point upwards Or (Beresford) 2nd on a wreath of the colours a mural crown Argent issuing therefrom a lion's head Gules gorged with a wreath Or (Pack).
Escutcheon
Quarterly 1st & 4th Argent semee of cross crosslets fitchee three fleurs-de-lis two and one Sable within a bordure wavy Pean (Beresford) 2nd & 3rd quarterly Sable and Erminois in the first quarter a sword in bend sinister Argent pommelled and hilted Or encircled by a wreath of the last in the fourt quarter a cinquefoil of the third pendant from a crimson riband bordered blue in the centre chief a representation of the Golden Cross and Clasps presented to the said Major General Sir Denis Pack KCB by His Majesty King George the Thurd in Testimony of his Royal approbation of the signal valour displayed by him the said Major General Pack in divers actions with the Enemy in the Peninsula of Spain (Pack).
Motto
Nil Nisi Cruce

Parliament of the United Kingdom
Preceded by William McClintock-Bunbury; Henry Bruen	Member of Parliament for County Carlow; 1862 – 1868; With: Henry Bruen	Succeeded by Arthur MacMurrough Kavanagh; Henry Bruen
