= Walter MacMurrough Kavanagh =

British politician

The Rt. Hon. Walter MacMurrough Kavanagh, PC (14 January 1856 – 18 July 1922), was a Member of Parliament (MP) who represented County Carlow from 1908 to 1910.

He was the son of Mary Frances (née Forde-Leathley) and Arthur MacMurrough Kavanagh who also served as MP for Carlow. His paternal grandmother Lady Harriet Kavanagh is thought to be the first Irish woman to travel in Egypt and insisted on his father, who was born with vestigial limbs, being raised to have the same opportunities as any other child.

He was educated at Eton and Christ Church, Oxford. He went on to hold a commission in the 5th Battalion of the Royal Irish Rifles before leaving the Army to concentrate on the management of his estate at Borris House in County Carlow. He was appointed High Sheriff of Carlow in 1884 and High Sheriff of Wexford in 1893.

His candidature for the by-election, caused by the death of John Hammond, was endorsed by Dr Patrick Foley, Lord Bishop of Kildare and Leighlin (and former President of Carlow College), due to Kavanagh's support for a Catholic University of Ireland.

He served as Chairman of Carlow County Council (1907–1918) but was replaced as chairman because of his support for Irish conscription. Kavanagh had been a member of the Reform Association who advocated a limited devolution for Ireland. He supported the more independent Nationalist Party and Home Rule.

He married Helen Louisa Howard, daughter of Colonel John Stanley Howard, on 1 February 1887 and had two sons, including Arthur, born 12 January 1888, and Dermot, born 9 January 1890, the latter an officer in the British Army. He died on 18 July 1922 aged 66 and is buried in Ballicopagan Cemetery.

Parliament of the United Kingdom
Preceded by John Hammond	Member of Parliament for County Carlow; 1908–January 1910	Succeeded by Michael Molloy
