= Henry Bruen (1789–1852) =

Politician

Colonel Henry Bruen (3 October 1789 – 5 November 1852) was an Irish Tory Party (and later Conservative Party) politician. He was Member of Parliament (MP) for County Carlow for a total of about 36 years, in three separate periods between 1812 and 1852, taking his seat in the House of Commons of what was then the United Kingdom of Great Britain and Ireland.

== Life ==
Henry was the son of Henry Bruen (1741–1795), and Dorothea Henrietta Knox. His father originally came from Boyle, County Roscommon, but had moved in 1775 to Oak Park estate, near Carlow town. The estate was inherited by Henry, and remained in the family until 1957.

Bruen was educated at Eton College and then at Christ Church, Oxford. He became a colonel in the Carlow militia in 1816.

In 1795, Bruen inherited the family estate of Oak Park. In 1828, Colonel Bruen supplied granite used in the construction of the Cathedral of the Assumption, Carlow from his quarry in Graiguenaspidogue a few kilometres south of Carlow town. He also supplied the oak for its great-framed roof from nearby Oak Park.

== Political career ==
Bruen was elected at the 1812 general election as MP for County Carlow, and was then returned unopposed at the next three general elections. He won a contested election in 1830, but did not stand at the 1831 general election. He stood again in 1832, but did not win either of Carlow's two seats. He regained a seat at the general election in January 1835, but the 1835 election in Carlow was overturned on petition, and Bruen lost his seat in the resulting by-election on 15 June. However, the by-election was itself the subject of a petition, and the result was overturned, with Bruen being returned to Westminster, along with his father-in-law, fellow Conservative Thomas Kavanagh.

He did not win a seat in 1837, but returned to the House of Commons in 1840, when he won a by-election on 5 December after the death of the Liberal MP Nicholas Aylward Vigors. He was then re-elected at the next three general elections, and died in office in November 1852 at the age of 63, five months after holding his seat at the general election in July.

== Marriage and issue ==
In 1822 he married Anne Wandesforde Kavanagh, daughter of Thomas Kavanagh, The MacMorrough and Lady Elizabeth Butler. (Anne's younger half-brother was Arthur MacMurrough Kavanagh (1831–1889), the severely disabled writer, politician and sportsman). They had three daughters and one son, Henry (1828–1912), who was MP for County Carlow from 1857 to 1880.

Parliament of the United Kingdom
Preceded by David Latouche; Walter Bagenal	Member of Parliament for County Carlow; 1812 – 1831; With: David Latouche to 1816; Robert Anthony Latouche 1816–1818; Sir Ulysses Burgh 1818–1826; Thomas Kavanagh 1826–1831	Succeeded by Walter Blackney; Sir John Milley Doyle
Preceded by Walter Blackney; Thomas Wallace	Member of Parliament for County Carlow; January 1835 – June 1835; With: Thomas Kavanagh	Succeeded by Nicholas Aylward Vigors; Alexander Raphael
Preceded by Alexander Raphael; Nicholas Aylward Vigors	Member of Parliament for County Carlow; August 1835 – August 1837; With: Thomas Kavanagh 1835 – Feb 1837; Nicholas Aylward Vigors from Feb 1837	Succeeded by Nicholas Aylward Vigors; John Ashton Yates
Preceded by Nicholas Aylward Vigors; John Ashton Yates	Member of Parliament for County Carlow; 1840 – 1852; With: John Ashton Yates to 1841; Thomas Bunbury 1841–1846; William McClintock-Bunbury 1846–1852; John Ball from July 1852	Succeeded by William McClintock-Bunbury; John Ball
