= John Hammond (Irish politician) =

Irish politician

John Hammond

John Hammond (January 1842 – 17 November 1907) was a UK Member of Parliament (MP) representing County Carlow in Ireland, from 1891 to 1907. A prominent merchant from Tullow Street in the town of Carlow, he was first elected to parliament as an Anti-Parnellite Irish National Federation candidate in the 1891 by-election. In 1899 he became the first Chairman of Carlow County Council and held that position until his death. Highly regarded for his probity and integrity, he enjoyed strong support from the Roman Catholic bishop and clergy. He was a Justice of the Peace and in his younger days he was actively involved with the Land League.

Parliament of the United Kingdom
Preceded by Charles James Patrick O'Gorman Mahon	Member of Parliament for County Carlow; 1891–1908	Succeeded by Walter MacMurrough Kavanagh
