= Henry Bruen (1828–1912) =

Irish politician

Henry Bruen PC, DL (16 June 1828 – 8 March 1912) was an Irish Conservative Party politician. He was Member of Parliament (MP) for County Carlow from 1857 to 1880, taking his seat in the House of Commons of what was then the United Kingdom of Great Britain and Ireland. He was the third (and last) in a line of Henry Bruens to represent County Carlow.

Bruen was elected unopposed at 1857 general election, taking a seat previously held by his father Henry Bruen (1789–1852). He was returned unopposed at the next the general elections, but at the 1880 general election, Carlow's two Conservative MPs were both defeated by Home Rule League candidates. On 26 April 1880, shortly after his electoral defeat, he was sworn as a member of the Privy Council of Ireland.

In addition to his Parliamentary seat, Bruen held a number of other appointments. He was High Sheriff of Carlow in 1855, and High Sheriff of Wexford in 1883, and was at some unspecified time a Justice of the Peace in both counties. He was also a Deputy Lieutenant (D.L.) of County Carlow.

== Family ==
Bruen was the youngest child, and only son, of Henry Bruen (1789–1852) and his wife Anne Wandesforde Kavanagh (died 1850). His father had been an MP for County Carlow for most of the period from 1812 until death; his grandfather Henry Bruen (1741–1795) had been a member of the pre-Act of Union Parliament of Ireland; and his uncle Francis Bruen was an MP for the borough of Carlow in the 1830s.

Henry Bruen lived at Coolbawn, County Wexford, and at Oak Park, an estate near Carlow town which his grandfather had acquired in 1775, and which remained in the family until 1957.

He married Mary Margaret Conolly, daughter of Edward Michael Conolly on 6 June 1854; they had 11 children. The estates were inherited by his eldest son, Henry (1856–1927), a lieutenant in the Royal Artillery. Another son, Edward Francis Bruen, was an admiral in the Royal Navy. In 1874 one of his daughters, Katharine Anne Bruen, married Thomas McClintock-Bunbury, 2nd Baron Rathdonnell.

Henry Bruen died at Oak Park in March 1912 aged 83.

Coat of arms of Henry Bruen

Notes
Confirmed 19 October 1927 by Sir Nevile Rodwell Wilkinson, Ulster King of Arms.
Crest
On a wreath of the colours a fisherman Proper holding in his dexter hand by the handle a landing net placed over the shoulders Or and in the sinister a fisherman's staff Gules.
Escutcheon
Sable a double-headed eagle displayed Or charged with a seimitan fessways Proper.
Motto
Fortitudine

Parliament of the United Kingdom
Preceded by William McClintock-Bunbury; John Ball	Member of Parliament for County Carlow; 1857 – 1880; With: William McClintock-Bunbury to 1862; Denis Pack-Beresford 1862–1868; Arthur MacMurrough Kavanagh 1868–1880	Succeeded by Edmund Dwyer Gray; Donald Horne Macfarlane
