= Michael Molloy (politician) =

Irish politician (1850–1926)

Member of Parliament for County Carlow
- In office January 1910 – December 1918
- Preceded by: Walter MacMurrough Kavanagh
- Succeeded by: James Lennon

Personal details
- Born: 1850 County Carlow, Ireland
- Died: 12 January 1926 (aged 75–76)
- Party: Irish Parliamentary Party

Michael Molloy (1850 – 12 January 1926) was an Irish nationalist politician and Member of Parliament (MP) from 1910 to 1918, taking his seat in the House of Commons of the United Kingdom.

Molloy, chairman of Carlow Urban Council, was nominated as candidate for the Irish Parliamentary Party in the constituency of County Carlow at the general election of January 1910, replacing Walter MacMurrough Kavanagh, who was standing down. He was elected unopposed, and again in the December 1910 general election. He did not run in the 1918 general election, and his seat was taken, unopposed, by James Lennon of Sinn Féin.

Parliament of the United Kingdom
Preceded by Walter MacMurrough Kavanagh	Member of Parliament for County Carlow; January 1910–1918	Succeeded by James Lennon
