= Thomas Bunbury (MP) =

Irish politician

Member of Parliament for County Carlow
- In office 11 July 1841 – 1 July 1846 Serving with Henry Bruen
- Preceded by: Henry Bruen; John Ashton Yates
- Succeeded by: Henry Bruen; William McClintock-Bunbury

Personal details
- Born: 1774
- Died: 28 May 1846 (aged 71–72)
- Party: Conservative

Thomas Bunbury (1774 – 28 May 1846) was an Irish Conservative politician.

He was elected Conservative MP for County Carlow at the 1841 general election and held the seat until his death in 1846.

Parliament of the United Kingdom
Preceded by John Ashton Yates; Henry Bruen	Member of Parliament for County Carlow; 1841–1846; With: Henry Bruen	Succeeded by Henry Bruen; William McClintock-Bunbury
