= 1908 County Carlow by-election =

UK Parliamentary by-election

The 1908 County Carlow by-election was held on 3 February 1908. The by-election was held due to the death of the incumbent Irish Parliamentary MP, John Hammond. It was won by the Irish Parliamentary candidate Walter Kavanagh, who was elected unopposed.

Kavanagh was endorsed by the Catholic Bishop of Kildare and Leighlin Dr. Patrick Foley (former president of Carlow College), due to Kavanagh's support for a Catholic University of Ireland. Kavanagh served for Carlow until 1910.
