= William McClintock-Bunbury =

Irish politician

William Bunbury McClintock-Bunbury (1800 – 2 June 1866), known as William McClintock until 1846, was an Irish naval commander and Conservative politician.

Born William McClintock, he was the son of John McClintock and Jane, daughter of William Bunbury. John McClintock, 1st Baron Rathdonnell, was his elder brother, and the explorer Sir Francis McClintock his nephew. In 1846, he assumed by Royal licence the additional surname of Bunbury.

McClintock-Bunbury was a captain in the Royal Navy. He also sat as member of parliament for County Carlow between 1846 and 1852, and again between 1853 and 1862.

McClintock-Bunbury married Pauline Caroline Diana Mary, daughter of Sir James Stronge, 2nd Baronet, in 1842. They had two sons and two daughters. His eldest son Thomas succeeded his uncle as second Baron Rathdonnell in 1879. McClintock-Bunbury died in June 1866. His wife survived him by 10 years and died in January 1876.

Parliament of the United Kingdom
Preceded by Henry Bruen; Thomas Bunbury	Member of Parliament for County Carlow; 1846–1852; With: Henry Bruen	Succeeded by Henry Bruen; John Ball
Preceded by Henry Bruen; John Ball	Member of Parliament for County Carlow; 1853–1862; With: John Ball, 1853–1857; Henry Bruen, 1857–1862	Succeeded by Henry Bruen; Denis Pack-Beresford
