= Oak Park, County Carlow =

Historic house and estate in County Carlow, Ireland

Oak Park
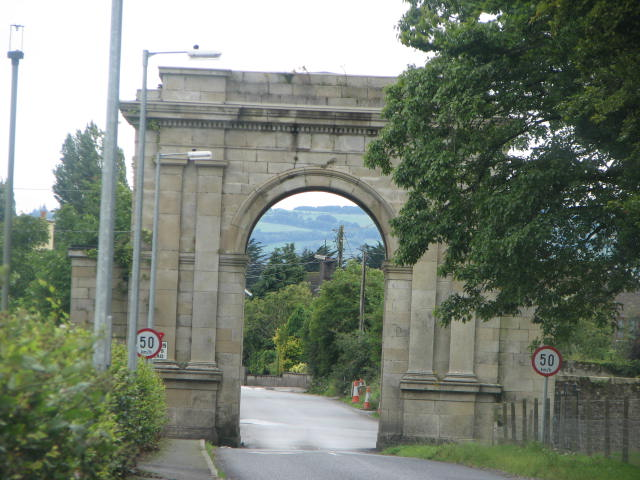
- Granite ionic entrance arch leading to the house.

- Location within Ireland
- Former names: Painestown

General information
- Type: House
- Architectural style: Greek Revival; Georgian
- Location: Oak Park, County Carlow, Carlow, Ireland
- Coordinates: 52.866°N 6.913°W
- Current tenants: Teagasc
- Groundbreaking: 1760 (original Georgian structure)
- Renovated: 1832 (Classical remodelling)
- Owner: Teagasc

Technical details
- Material: granite
- Floor count: 2 over basement
- Grounds: 220 ha (540 acres)

Design and construction
- Architect: William Vitruvius Morrison (Main house remodelling)
- Developer: Henry Bruen (1832 works)

Oak Park is a Georgian house and estate in County Carlow, Ireland, located 3 kilometres (2 mi) north of the town of Carlow.

== History ==
The estate was purchased by Irish MP Henry Bruen in 1775 and was substantially remodelled to its current form by the architect William Vitruvius Morrison in 1832. It remained in the family until 1957, being inhabited by Bruen's son and grandson, both MPs of the Parliament of the United Kingdom of Great Britain and Ireland.

In 1960 the property was sold to the state via the Irish Land Commission, and it ultimately became the headquarters of Teagasc in the 21st century.

== Buildings and structures ==
The site includes several notable buildings and structures including Oak Park House. What was originally an extensive Georgian house dating from around 1760 was remodelled in 1832 to become a five-bay, two-storey house. The redesign was led by William Vitruvius Morrison and Richard Morrison. A granite ionic triumphal arch was also constructed to their design.

The house was later extensively restored following a fire by architect William Mansfield Mitchell in 1902.

Other structures on the estate include:

- A mausoleum (built c. 1841; now ruined), designed by John B. Keane in a Greek Revival style
- Oakpark Graveyard (c. 1700–1750), with remains of a church built c. 1725
- A two-storey stable complex (built c. 1750–1780), renovated in 1985
- A single-arch cast-iron bridge (built c. 1815), designed by George Papworth

== Other facilities ==
120 acres (49 ha) of the site are now operated by the Carlow Tourist Office as Oak Park Forest Park. The admission-free park, which features 4 kilometres (2.5 mi) of nature trails, won a Royal Dublin Society Irish Forestry Award in 2013.

Oak Park also hosts a 590-acre (239 ha) "national centre for tillage and bio-energy crops research", operated by Teagasc.

== Gallery ==
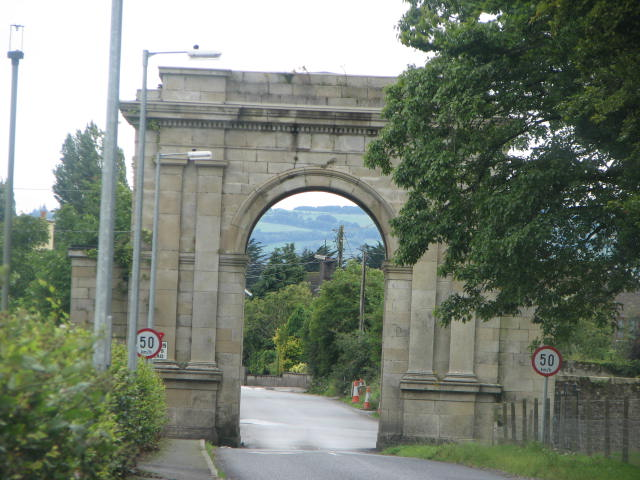
Triumphal arch on the Oak Park estate

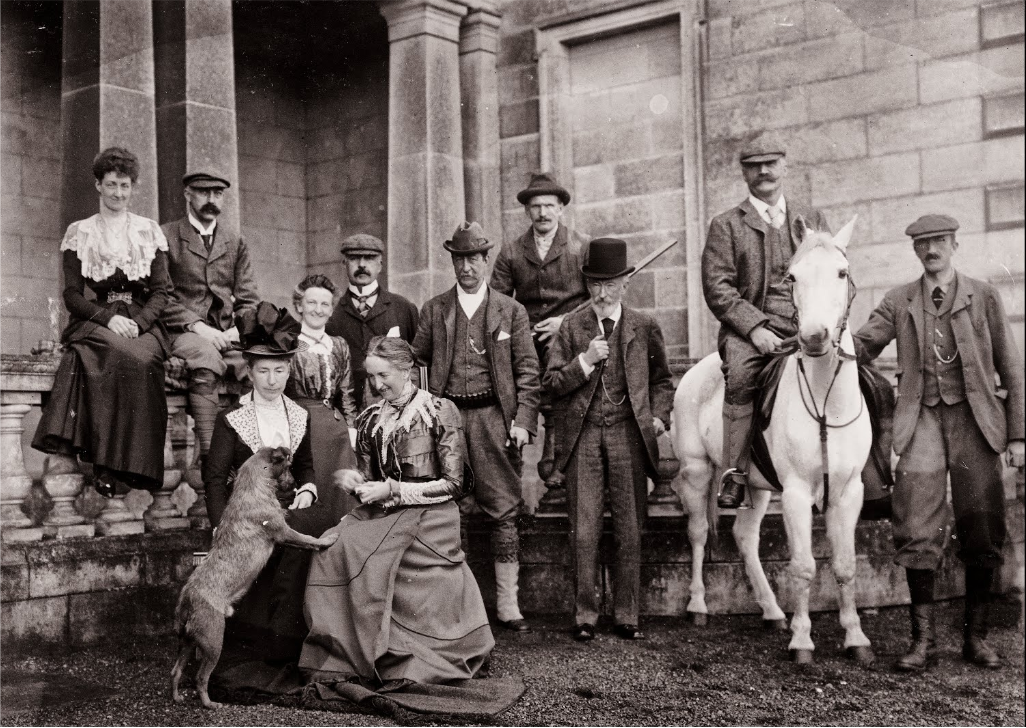
A house party at Oak Park, 1901

== See also ==
- Carlow County Museum
- Duckett's Grove
- List of country houses in County Carlow
