= John Ball (naturalist) =

British politician, naturalist and Alpine traveller. (1818–1889)

- John Ball.

Under-Secretary of State for the Colonies
- In office 8 February 1855 – June 1857
- Monarch: Victoria
- Prime Minister: The Viscount Palmerston
- Preceded by: Frederick Peel
- Succeeded by: Chichester Fortescue

Personal details
- Born: 20 August 1818 Dublin, Ireland
- Died: 21 October 1889 (aged 71) London, England
- Party: Whig
- Education: Christ's College, Cambridge

John Ball (20 August 1818 – 21 October 1889) was an Irish politician, naturalist and Alpine traveller.

== Background and education ==
Ball was born in Dublin, the eldest son of Nicholas Ball, judge of the Court of Common Pleas (Ireland) and his wife Jane Sherlock. He was educated at Oscott College near Birmingham, and at Christ's College, Cambridge, where he was 41st Wrangler but as a Roman Catholic could not be admitted to a BA degree. He showed in his early years a taste for natural science, particularly botany; and after leaving Cambridge he travelled in Switzerland and elsewhere in Europe and North Africa, studying his favourite pursuits, and contributing papers on botany and the Swiss glaciers to scientific periodicals.

== Political career ==
In 1846 Ball was made an assistant poor-law commissioner, but resigned in 1847, and in 1848 stood unsuccessfully as a parliamentary candidate for Sligo. In 1849 he was appointed second poor-law commissioner, but resigned in 1852 and successfully contested the County Carlow constituency in the Whig interest. In 1854, while grave doubts were raised in well-informed quarters about entering a war with Russia, the voice of the people found expression in Ball who assured the government that justification of the Crimean war was vast, high and noble: 'the maintenance in civilised society of the principles of right and justice'. In the British House of Commons he attracted Lord Palmerston's attention by his abilities, and in 1855 was made Under-Secretary of State for the Colonies, a post which he held for two years.

At the colonial office he had great influence in furthering the cause of natural science, particularly in connection with equipment of the Palliser Expedition in Canada (for his efforts, the Ball Range in the Canadian Rockies was named after him), and with William Jackson Hooker's efforts to obtain a systematic knowledge of the colonial floras.

== Alpinist ==
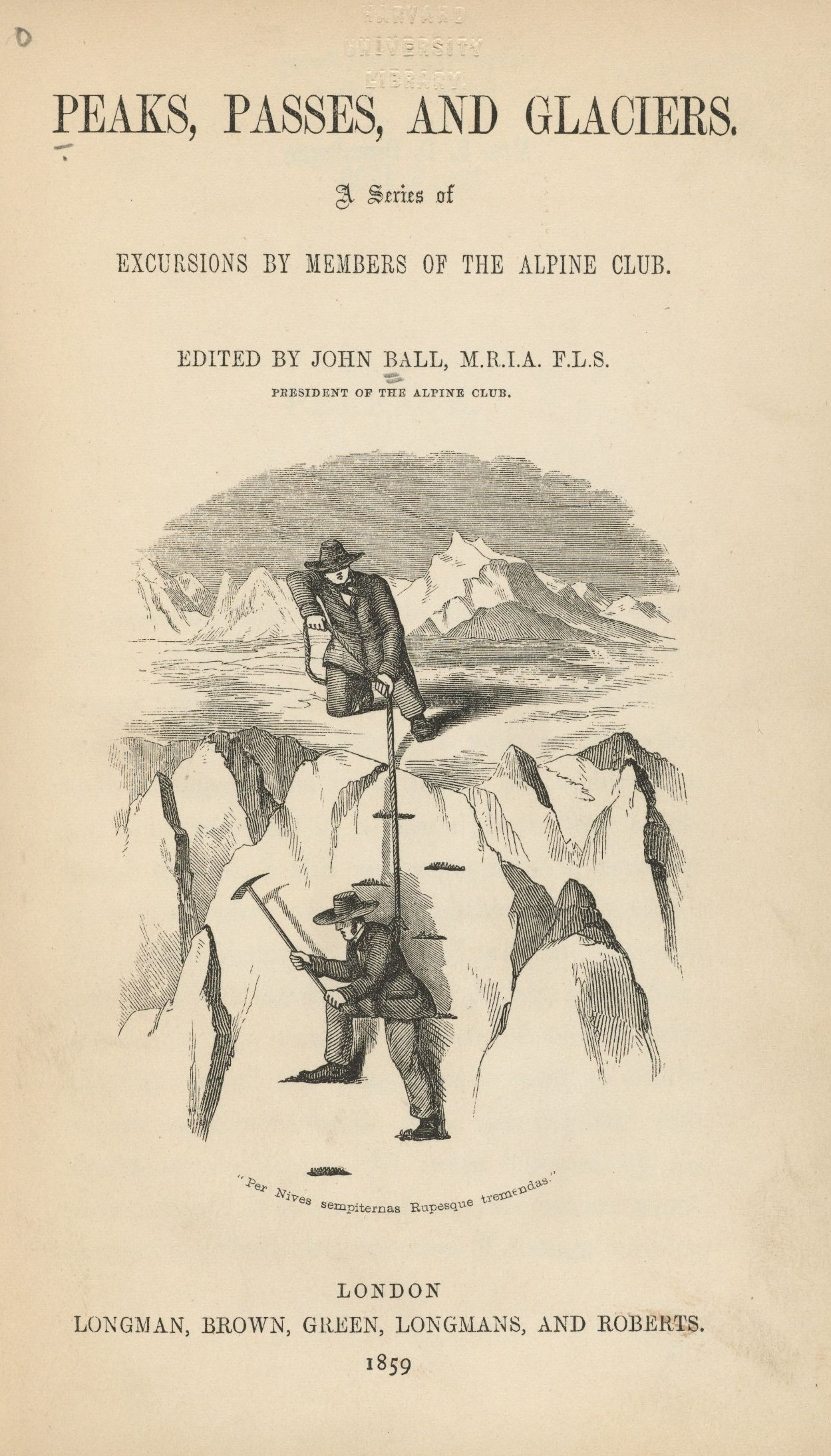
Title page from Peaks, Passes, and Glaciers, 1859, edited by John Ball while president of the Alpine Club

In 1858 Ball stood for County Limerick, but was defeated, and he then gave up politics and devoted himself to natural history. He was the first president of the Alpine Club (founded 1857), and it is for his work as an alpinist that he is chiefly remembered. His well-known Alpine Guide (London, 1863–1868) was the result of innumerable climbs and journeys and of careful observation recorded in a clear and often entertaining style. Among his accomplishments, he was the first to climb a major Dolomites peak (Monte Pelmo in 1857). He is the namesake of Cima di Ball in the Dolomites. He also travelled in Morocco (1871) and South America (1882), and recorded his observations in books which were recognised as having scientific value.

== Personal life ==
His wife was Elisa Parolini, daughter of the Italian naturalist Alberto Parolini. Ball died in London in October 1889, aged 71.

== Notes ==
Parliament of the United Kingdom
Preceded by William McClintock-Bunbury; Henry Bruen	Member of Parliament for County Carlow; 1852 – 1857; With: Henry Bruen 1852–1853; William McClintock-Bunbury 1853–1857	Succeeded by William McClintock-Bunbury; Henry Bruen
Political offices
Preceded by Frederick Peel	Under-Secretary of State for the Colonies; 1855–1857	Succeeded by Chichester Fortescue
