= Henry Bruen (1741–1795) =

Irish politician

- Born: 1741
- Died: 14 December 1795 (aged 53–54)
- Occupation: politician
- Years active: 1783–1795
- Known for: Member of Parliament (MP)
- Spouse: Dorothea Henrietta Knox (m. 1787)
- Children: 3 sons, 3 daughters, including Henry, Francis
- Father: Moses Bruen

Henry Bruen (1741 – 14 December 1795) was an Irish politician. In the pre-Act of Union Parliament of Ireland, he was Member of Parliament (MP) for Jamestown from 1783 to 1790, and then for County Carlow from 1790 until his death in 1795.

== Family ==
Henry was the second son of Moses Bruen (died 1757), from Boyle, County Roscommon. He married Dorothea Henrietta Knox, daughter of Francis Knox, in 1787. They had three sons and three daughters: their eldest son Henry (1789–1852), was an MP for County Carlow for most of the period from 1812 to 1852, and their youngest child Francis was MP for the borough of Carlow in the 1830s. Henry's son Henry Bruen (1828–1912), was MP for County Carlow from 1857 to 1880.

From 1775 until 1957, the family lived in Oak Park estate, near Carlow town.

Parliament of Ireland
Preceded by Richard Martin; John Hall	Member of Parliament for Jamestown; 1783–1790; With: Sir Francis Hutchinson	Succeeded by Henry Wood; Arthur Wolfe
Preceded by Sir Richard Butler, 7th Bt; William Henry Burton	Member of Parliament for County Carlow; 1790–1795; With: William Henry Burton	Succeeded by Sir Richard Butler, 7th Bt; William Henry Burton
