= Harriet Kavanagh =

Irish artist

Lady Harriet Kavanagh
- Born: Harriet Margaret Le Poer Trench; 13 October 1799
- Died: 14 July 1885 (aged 85); Ballyragget Lodge, County Kilkenny
- Resting place: St Mullin's Abbey, Borris, County Carlow
- Known for: travelling and Egyptology collections
- Spouse: Thomas Kavanagh (m. 1825)
- Parents: Richard Le Poer Trench (father); Henrietta Margaret Staples (mother)

Lady Harriet Kavanagh (13 October 1799 – 14 July 1885) was an Irish artist, traveller, and antiquarian, described as a "woman of high culture and of unusual artistic power." She is thought to be the first Irish female traveller to Egypt.

== Early life and family ==
Harriet Kavanagh was born Lady Harriet Margaret Le Poer Trench on 13 October 1799. She was the second daughter of Richard Le Poer Trench and Henrietta Margaret Le Poer Trench (née Staples), with three brothers and three sisters. She married Thomas Kavanagh of Borris House, County Carlow on 28 February 1825, as his second wife. The couple had four children, three sons Charles, Thomas, Arthur, and one daughter, Harriet or "Hoddy."

Her third son, Arthur MacMurrough Kavanagh, was born without fully formed limbs. Some attributed the disability to a peasant's curse, whilst others have speculated it was due to Lady Kavanagh taking laudanum during her pregnancy. Kavanagh refused to treat her son differently to his siblings, and with the help of local doctor Francis Boxwell, raised him as a normal child. During his initial education, Kavanagh taught Arthur herself, teaching him to paint and then write by holding brushes and pens in his mouth. With the help of the surgeon Sir Philip Crampton, she has a mechanical wheelchair constructed for Arthur, and also encouraged him to ride horses and engage in other outdoor activities. Kavanagh's husband died after 12 years of marriage, in 1837.

== Travelling ==
In 1846, Kavanagh took her children to learn French in Saint-Germain-en-Laye, later travelling to Rome. As an antiquarian, Kavanagh also wanted to visit Egypt and the Holy Land, setting off on the long journey from Marseille in October 1846. Accompanying her were her daughter, Harriet, her two sons, Thomas and Arthur, their tutor, the Rev. David Wood and a maid, Miss Hudson. In Cairo, she hired two feluccas with Arab crews, and visited archaeological sites along the Nile, such as Thebes, Karnak, and the Nubia region. From there, Kavanagh visited sites of biblical interest, including Tyre, Sidon, and Rhoda Island. She negotiated with Bedouin chiefs in Aqaba, hiring camels and Bedouin guides to travel to Hebron. She visited harems and a slave market and recorded the journey's incidents in her diary, including her son Arthur's accidental near drowning when he fell off their boat whilst fishing.

Whilst in Cairo, Kavanagh became acquainted with a number of fellow Europeans, including Sir Charles Murray, Sophia Lane Poole, and Edward William Lane. Harriet Martineau travelled with the party from Cairo to the Holy Land.

Whilst visiting Jerusalem in Easter 1847, she bore witness to a confrontation over the control of holy places between Roman and Orthodox Catholics priests. She went on to visit Petra, the Sinai Peninsula, Beirut, Smyrna, and Constantinople. The group spent a second winter in Egypt before travelling to the Black Sea before returning to Marseille in April 1848. Much of these journeys were conducted on horse or camel-back, with one desert crossing taking 36 days. Kavanagh later commented on her travels as a woman, stating "quite enough danger to make it a very exciting business."

In 1850 and 1852, Kavanagh travelled to Corfu, returning to Borris with samples of Greek lace. She taught a number of her tenants to copy these designs, which led to the establishment of a local lace-making industry. She was elected to the Kilkenny Archaeological Society in 1851.

== Later life ==
Kavanagh moved to Ballyragget Lodge, County Kilkenny in 1860, dying there on 14 July 1885. She is buried in St Mullin's Abbey, Borris in County Carlow. Kavanagh documented her travels in journals, with drawings and paintings of the sites she visited. These are held by the Kavanagh family, along with an oil portrait and a self-portrait. Her collection of roughly 300 Egyptian antiquities were donated to the Royal Society of Antiquaries of Ireland after her death. These collections were later moved to the National Museum of Ireland, and form a core element of the Museum's Egyptian collection. Copies of two of her watercolours, a self-portrait, and a landscape are on display in the Museum.
