= Arthur MacMurrough Kavanagh =

Irish politician

Arthur MacMurrough Kavanagh (25 March 1831 – 25 December 1889) was an Irish politician. His middle name is spelt MacMorrough in some contemporaneous sources.

== Biography ==
Arthur MacMurrough Kavanagh was born on 25 March 1831 at Borris House in County Carlow, the son of Thomas Kavanagh MP and artist Lady Harriet Margaret Le Poer Trench, daughter of the second Earl of Clancarty. His father traced his lineage to the medieval Kings of Leinster through Art MacMurrough-Kavanagh and furthermore being an 8th generation descendant of Cahir mac Art Kavanagh, 1st Baron of Ballyane. He had two older brothers, Charles and Thomas, and one sister, Harriet or "Hoddy." Arthur Kavanagh was born with only the rudiments of arms and legs, though the cause of this birth defect is unknown.

His mother insisted that he be brought up and have opportunities like any other child and placed him in the care of the doctor Francis Boxwell, who believed that an armless and legless child could live a productive life. Kavanagh learnt to ride horses at the age of three by being strapped to a special saddle and managing the horse with the stumps of his arms. With the help of the surgeon Sir Philip Crampton, Lady Harriet had a mechanical wheelchair constructed for her son, and encouraged him to ride horses and engage in other outdoor activities. He also went fishing, hunted animals, drew pictures, and wrote stories, with mechanical devices supplementing his physical capacities. His mother taught him how to write and paint holding pens and brushes in his mouth.

In 1846, Lady Harriet took three of her children, Thomas, Harriet and Arthur, travelling to the Middle East for two years. Arthur Kavanagh nearly drowned in the Nile when he fell in whilst fishing and was rescued by a local antiquities salesman who dived in to pull him out.

In 1849, Kavanagh's mother discovered that he had been having affairs with girls on the family estate, so she sent him into exile to Uppsala, and then to Moscow with his brother and a clergyman, whom he came to hate. He travelled extensively in Egypt, Anatolia, Persia, and India between 1846 and 1853; in India, his letter of credit from his mother was cancelled when she discovered that he had spent two weeks in a harem, so he persuaded the East India Company to hire him as a despatch rider. Other sources say that this was due to the death of his eldest brother Charles of consumption in December 1851, which left him with only 30 shillings.

In 1851, Kavanagh succeeded to the family estates and the title of The MacMurrough following the death of his older brother Thomas. He served as High Sheriff of County Kilkenny for 1856 and High Sheriff of Carlow for 1857. A Conservative and a Protestant, he sat in Parliament for County Wexford from 1866 to 1868, and for County Carlow from 1868 to 1880. On being elected, he had to be placed on the Tory benches by his manservant; the Speaker, Evelyn Denison, gave a special dispensation to allow the manservant to stay in the chamber during sittings. Kavanagh was opposed to the disestablishment of the (Anglican) Church of Ireland, but supported the Landlord and Tenant (Ireland) Act 1870. On losing his seat in 1880, William Ewart Gladstone appointed him to the Bessborough Commission, but he disagreed with its conclusions and published his own dissenting report. In 1886, he was made a member of the Privy Council of Ireland.

Kavanagh died of pneumonia on 25 December (Christmas Day) 1889 in London aged 58, and was buried in Ballicopagan cemetery. He was succeeded in the title of the MacMurrough by his son, Walter MacMurrough Kavanagh, who also served as MP for County Carlow from 1908 to 1910. The 1901 novel The History of Sir Richard Calmady, written by Lucas Malet (pseudonym of Mary St Leger Kingsley), is based on his life.

== Family ==
Kavanagh married his cousin, Mary Frances Forde-Leathley, in 1855. Assisted by his wife, he was a philanthropic landlord, active county magistrate, and chairman of the board of guardians. Together, they had seven children:

- Eva (died 1896)
- May (died 1949)
- Agnes (died 1932)
- Walter (died 1922)
- Arthur (died 1882)
- Charles (died 1950)
- Osborne (died 1897)

Parliament of the United Kingdom
Preceded by Sir James Power; John George	Member of Parliament for County Wexford; 1866–1868; With: Sir James Power, Bt	Succeeded by John Talbot Power; Matthew Peter D'Arcy
Preceded by Henry Bruen; Denis Pack-Beresford	Member of Parliament for County Carlow; 1868–1880; With: Henry Bruen	Succeeded by Edmund Dwyer Gray; Donald Horne Macfarlane
Honorary titles
Preceded by The Earl of Bessborough	Lord Lieutenant of Carlow; 1880–1889	Succeeded by The Lord Rathdonnell
