= Walter Blackney =

Irish politician (1775–1842)

Walter Blackney (1 August 1775 – 14 September 1842) was an Irish politician who served as Member of Parliament for County Carlow.

== Early life ==
Blackney was born on 1 August 1775 as the eldest son of James Blackney of Ballycormack and Ballyellin and his wife Gertrude, née Galwey. The Blackney family had inherited Ballycormack almost a century previously in the 1680s, and were a Catholic family. Blackney's father died on 28 March 1796 and thus inherited the estates, which included leasehold properties in Ballyellin and Clonmoney.

== Political career ==
Blackney did not take much part in politics until 1829 when he chaired a meeting in support of the Repeal Association. He assisted County Carlow's independent candidates in the 1830 general election and was a candidate himself in the 1831 election, and was elected unopposed. He was re-elected in 1832 and retired in 1834.

== Death ==
Blackney died on 14 September 1842, complaining of "violent oppression about his heart" and was succeeded by his son, Hugh.
