= County Carlow (UK Parliament constituency) =

UK parliamentary constituency in Ireland, 1801–1922

- Former county constituency for the House of Commons
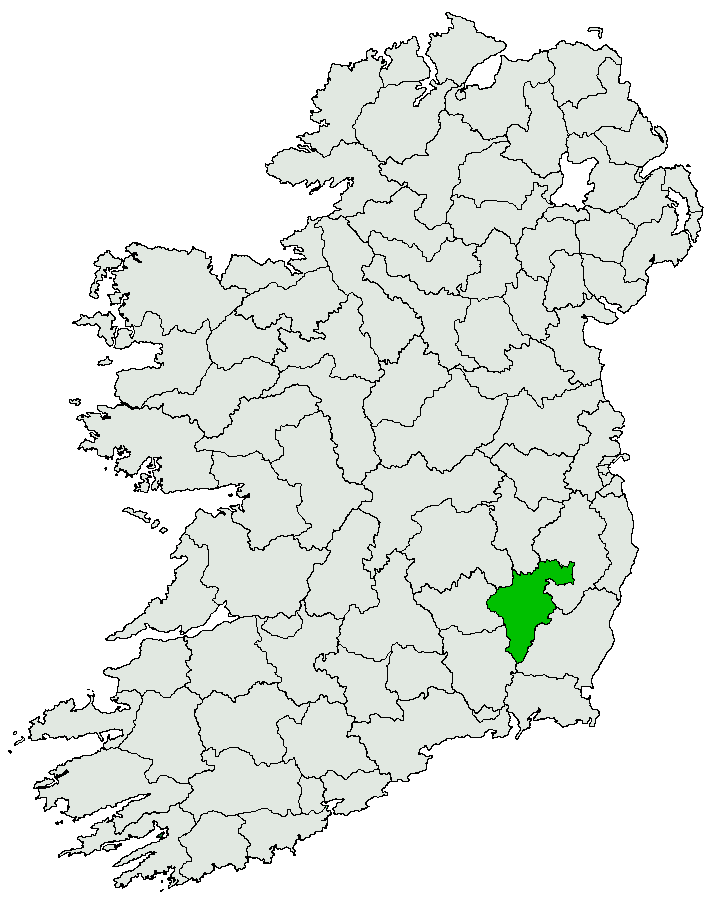
- County: County Carlow

1801–1922
- Seats: 2 (1801–1885); 1 (1885–1922)
- Created from: County Carlow (IHC)
- Replaced by: Carlow–Kilkenny

County Carlow was a parliamentary constituency in Ireland represented in the House of Commons of the United Kingdom from 1801 to 1922. It returned two Members of Parliament (MPs) from 1801 to 1885 and one MP from 1885 to 1922.

== History and representation ==
County Carlow had been represented by two seats in the Irish House of Commons. Under the Acts of Union 1800, it continued to be represented by two MPs, now in the United Kingdom House of Commons, sitting at the Palace of Westminster. It comprised the whole of County Carlow, except for the borough of Carlow, which was separately represented from 1801 to 1885. The borough of Old Leighlin was disfranchised under the Acts of Union 1800.

Under the Redistribution of Seats Act 1885, the borough of Carlow was disfranchised and the county was reduced to one seat. It was the only Irish county not divided in the 1885 redistribution. It was thus the only Irish county constituency to exist at every general election from the union with Great Britain to the establishment of the Irish Free State.

It was not affected by the Redistribution of Seats (Ireland) Act 1918. The 1918 general election was used by Sinn Féin as the first election to Dáil Éireann. James Lennon sat as a member of the First Dáil, abstaining from Westminster.

Under the Government of Ireland Act 1920, it was combined with the constituencies of North Kilkenny and South Kilkenny to form Carlow–Kilkenny as a 4-seat constituency for the new Southern Ireland House of Commons and a one-seat constituency at Westminster. Sinn Féin treated the 1921 election for the Southern Ireland House of Commons, in which all seats were uncontested, as part of the election to the Second Dáil. James Lennon was one of four returned to represent Carlow–Kilkenny for Sinn Féin.

The Anglo-Irish Treaty, signed 6 December 1921, provided for the establishment of the Irish Free State. Under the Irish Free State (Agreement) Act 1922, no writ was to be issued "for a constituency in Ireland other than a constituency in Northern Ireland". Therefore, following a dissolution on 26 October 1922, no vote was held in Carlow–Kilkenny at the 1922 United Kingdom general election on 15 November 1922. The Irish Free State left the United Kingdom on 6 December 1922.

== Members of Parliament ==
Notable MPs for County Carlow included Nicholas Aylward Vigors, a zoologist, John Ball, a naturalist and Under-Secretary of State for the Colonies, Arthur MacMurrough Kavanagh, and James Patrick Mahon.

=== MPs 1801–1885 ===
| Election | 1st Member | 1st Party | 2nd Member | 2nd Party |
|---|---|---|---|---|
| 1801 | William Henry Burton | | Sir Richard Butler, Bt | |
| Jul. 1802 | David Latouche | Whig | Walter Bagenal | Whig |
| Oct. 1812 | David Latouche | Whig | Henry Bruen | Tory |
| 18 Apr 1816 | Robert Anthony Latouche | Whig | Henry Bruen | Tory |
| Jun 1818 | Sir Ulysses Burgh | Tory | Henry Bruen | Tory |
| Jun 1826 | Thomas Kavanagh | Tory | Henry Bruen | Tory |
| May 1831 | Walter Blackney | Whig | Sir John Milley Doyle | Whig |
| Dec 1832 | Walter Blackney | Repeal Association | Thomas Wallace | Whig |
| Jan. 1835 | Henry Bruen | Conservative | Thomas Kavanagh | Conservative |
| 15 Jun 1835 | Nicholas Aylward Vigors | Repeal Association (Note: Vigors was a supporter of the Whig/Repealer pact, 1835–1841, and who in 1832–1835 had been MP for the borough of Carlow as a member of the Repeal Association.) | Alexander Raphael | Whig |
| 19 Aug 1835 | Henry Bruen | Conservative | Thomas Kavanagh | Conservative |
| 18 Feb 1837 | Henry Bruen | Conservative | Nicholas Aylward Vigors | Whig |
| Aug 1837 | John Ashton Yates | Whig | Nicholas Aylward Vigors | Whig |
| 5 Dec 1840 | John Ashton Yates | Whig | Henry Bruen | Conservative |
| Jul 1841 | Thomas Bunbury | Conservative | Henry Bruen | Conservative |
| 1 Jul 1846 | William McClintock-Bunbury | Conservative | Henry Bruen | Conservative |
| Jul 1852 | John Ball | Independent Irish Party | Henry Bruen | Conservative |
| 25 Apr 1853 | John Ball | Independent Irish Party | William McClintock-Bunbury | Conservative |
| Apr 1857 | Henry Bruen (younger) | Conservative | William McClintock-Bunbury | Conservative |
| 7 Aug 1862 | Henry Bruen (younger) | Conservative | Denis Pack-Beresford | Conservative |
| Nov 1868 | Henry Bruen (younger) | Conservative | Arthur MacMurrough Kavanagh | Conservative |
| Apr 1880 | Edmund Dwyer Gray | Home Rule League | Donald Horne Macfarlane | Home Rule League |
| 1885 | representation reduced to one member | | | |

=== MPs 1885–1922 ===
| From | To | Name | Party |
|---|---|---|---|
| 1885 | 1886 | Edmund Dwyer Gray | Nationalist |
| 1886 | 1887 | John Aloysius Blake | Nationalist |
| 1887 | 1891 | James Patrick Mahon | Nationalist |
| 1891 | 1892 | John Hammond | Nationalist |
| 1892 | 1900 | John Hammond | Irish National Federation |
| 1900 | 1908 | John Hammond | Nationalist |
| 1908 | 1910 | Walter MacMurrough Kavanagh | Nationalist |
| 1910 | 1918 | Michael Molloy | Nationalist |
| 1918 | 1922 | James Lennon | Sinn Féin |

== Elections ==
=== Elections in the 1830s ===
General election 1830: Carlow (2 seats)
| Party | Candidate | Votes | % |
|---|---|---|---|
| Tory | Henry Bruen | 242 | 38.3 |
| Tory | Thomas Kavanagh | 216 | 34.2 |
| Whig | Horace William Noel Rochfort | 174 | 27.5 |
| Majority | | 42 | 6.7 |
| Turnout | | 371 | 70.0 |
| Registered electors | | 530 | |
| Tory hold | | | |
| Tory hold | | | |

General election 1831: Carlow (2 seats)
| Party | Candidate | Votes | % |
|---|---|---|---|
| Whig | Walter Blackney | Unopposed | |
| Whig | John Milley Doyle | Unopposed | |
| Registered electors | | 530 | |
| Whig gain from Tory | | | |
| Whig gain from Tory | | | |

General election 1832: Carlow (2 seats)
| Party | Candidate | Votes | % |
|---|---|---|---|
| Repeal | Walter Blackney | 657 | 29.0 |
| Whig | Thomas Wallace | 657 | 29.0 |
| Tory | Henry Bruen | 483 | 21.3 |
| Tory | Thomas Kavanagh | 470 | 20.7 |
| Majority | | 174 | 7.7 |
| Turnout | | 1,160 | 93.1 |
| Registered electors | | 1,246 | |
| Repeal gain from Whig | | | |
| Whig hold | | | |

General election 1835: Carlow (2 seats)
| Party | Candidate | Votes | % | ±% |
|---|---|---|---|---|
| Conservative | Henry Bruen | 588 | 25.8 | +4.5 |
| Conservative | Thomas Kavanagh | 587 | 25.7 | +5.0 |
| Repeal (Whig) | Maurice O'Connell | 554 | 24.3 | −4.7 |
| Repeal (Whig) | Michael Cahill | 553 | 24.2 | −4.8 |
| Majority | | 33 | 1.4 | N/A |
| Turnout | | 1,144 | 90.1 | −3.0 |
| Registered electors | | 1,269 | | |
| Conservative gain from Repeal | | Swing | +4.6 | |
| Conservative gain from Whig | | Swing | +4.9 | |

On petition, Bruen and Kavanagh were unseated and a by-election was called.

By-election, 15 June 1835: Carlow (2 seats)
| Party | Candidate | Votes | % | ±% |
|---|---|---|---|---|
| Repeal (Whig) | Nicholas Aylward Vigors | 627 | 26.2 | +1.9 |
| Whig | Alexander Raphael | 626 | 26.1 | +1.9 |
| Conservative | Thomas Kavanagh | 572 | 23.9 | −1.8 |
| Conservative | Henry Bruen | 571 | 23.8 | −2.0 |
| Majority | | 54 | 2.2 | N/A |
| Turnout | | c. 1,198 | c. 94.4 | c. +4.3 |
| Registered electors | | 1,269 | | |
| Repeal gain from Conservative | | Swing | +1.9 | |
| Whig gain from Conservative | | Swing | +1.9 | |

After a further petition, the poll was amended and 105 votes for Vigors and Raphael were struck off. Kavanagh and Bruen were declared elected.

Kavanagh's death caused a by-election.

By-election, 18 February 1837: Carlow
| Party | Candidate | Votes | % | ±% |
|---|---|---|---|---|
| Repeal (Whig) | Nicholas Aylward Vigors | 669 | 51.4 | +2.8 |
| Conservative | Thomas Bunbury | 633 | 48.6 | −2.9 |
| Majority | | 36 | 2.8 | N/A |
| Turnout | | 1,302 | 75.8 | −14.3 |
| Registered electors | | 1,718 | | |
| Repeal gain from Conservative | | Swing | +2.9 | |

General election 1837: Carlow (2 seats)
| Party | Candidate | Votes | % | ±% |
|---|---|---|---|---|
| Repeal (Whig) | Nicholas Aylward Vigors | 730 | 26.6 | +2.3 |
| Whig | John Ashton Yates | 730 | 26.6 | +2.4 |
| Conservative | Henry Bruen | 643 | 23.4 | −2.4 |
| Conservative | Thomas Bunbury | 643 | 23.4 | −2.3 |
| Majority | | 87 | 3.2 | N/A |
| Turnout | | 1,373 | 77.2 | −12.9 |
| Registered electors | | 1,779 | | |
| Repeal gain from Conservative | | Swing | +2.3 | |
| Whig gain from Conservative | | Swing | +2.4 | |

=== Elections in the 1840s ===
Vigors' death caused a by-election.

By-election, 5 December 1840: Carlow
| Party | Candidate | Votes | % | ±% |
|---|---|---|---|---|
| Irish Conservative | Henry Bruen | 722 | 56.5 | +9.7 |
| Whig | Frederick Ponsonby | 555 | 43.5 | −9.7 |
| Majority | | 167 | 13.0 | N/A |
| Turnout | | 1,277 (est) | 72.6 (est) | c. −4.6 |
| Registered electors | | 1,759 | | |
| Conservative gain from Whig | | Swing | +9.7 | |

General election 1841: Carlow (2 seats)
| Party | Candidate | Votes | % | ±% |
|---|---|---|---|---|
| Irish Conservative | Henry Bruen | 705 | 25.2 | +1.8 |
| Irish Conservative | Thomas Bunbury | 704 | 25.1 | +1.7 |
| Whig | John Ashton Yates | 697 | 24.9 | −1.7 |
| Repeal | Daniel O'Connell | 696 | 24.8 | −1.8 |
| Majority | | 7 | 0.2 | N/A |
| Turnout | | 1,401 (est) | 79.6 (est) | c. +2.4 |
| Registered electors | | 1,759 | | |
| Conservative gain from Whig | | Swing | +1.8 | |
| Conservative gain from Whig | | Swing | +1.7 | |

Bunbury's death caused a by-election.

By-election, 1 July 1846: Carlow
| Party | Candidate | Votes | % | ±% |
|---|---|---|---|---|
| Irish Conservative | William McClintock | Unopposed | | |
| Conservative hold | | | | |

General election 1847: Carlow
| Party | Candidate | Votes | % | ±% |
|---|---|---|---|---|
| Irish Conservative | William McClintock-Bunbury | Unopposed | | |
| Irish Conservative | Henry Bruen | Unopposed | | |
| Registered electors | | 1,984 | | |
| Conservative hold | | | | |
| Conservative hold | | | | |

=== Elections in the 1850s ===
General election 1852: Carlow (2 seats)
| Party | Candidate | Votes | % | ±% |
|---|---|---|---|---|
| Independent Irish | John Ball | 895 | 25.2 | New |
| Irish Conservative | Henry Bruen | 893 | 25.2 | N/A |
| Irish Conservative | William McClintock-Bunbury | 880 | 24.8 | N/A |
| Whig | John Henry Keogh | 877 | 24.7 | New |
| Turnout | | 1,773 (est) | 84.8 (est) | N/A |
| Registered electors | | 2,090 | | |
| Majority | | 15 | 0.4 | N/A |
| Independent Irish gain from Conservative | | Swing | N/A | |
| Majority | | 16 | 0.4 | N/A |
| Conservative hold | | Swing | N/A | |

Bruen's death caused a by-election.

By-election, 25 April 1853: Carlow (1 seat)
| Party | Candidate | Votes | % | ±% |
|---|---|---|---|---|
| Irish Conservative | William McClintock-Bunbury | Unopposed | | |
| Registered electors | | 2,039 | | |
| Conservative hold | | | | |

General election 1857: Carlow (2 seats)
| Party | Candidate | Votes | % | ±% |
|---|---|---|---|---|
| Irish Conservative | Henry Bruen | Unopposed | | |
| Irish Conservative | William McClintock-Bunbury | Unopposed | | |
| Registered electors | | 2,381 | | |
| Conservative hold | | | | |
| Conservative gain from Independent Irish | | | | |

General election 1859: Carlow (2 seats)
| Party | Candidate | Votes | % | ±% |
|---|---|---|---|---|
| Irish Conservative | Henry Bruen | Unopposed | | |
| Irish Conservative | William McClintock-Bunbury | Unopposed | | |
| Registered electors | | 2,418 | | |
| Conservative hold | | | | |
| Conservative hold | | | | |

=== Elections in the 1860s ===
McClintock Bunbury resigned, causing a by-election.

By-election, 7 August 1862: Carlow (1 seat)
| Party | Candidate | Votes | % | ±% |
|---|---|---|---|---|
| Irish Conservative | Denis Pack-Beresford | Unopposed | | |
| Registered electors | | 2,520 | | |
| Conservative hold | | | | |

General election 1865: Carlow (2 seats)
| Party | Candidate | Votes | % | ±% |
|---|---|---|---|---|
| Irish Conservative | Henry Bruen | Unopposed | | |
| Irish Conservative | Denis Pack-Beresford | Unopposed | | |
| Registered electors | | 2,449 | | |
| Conservative hold | | | | |
| Conservative hold | | | | |

General election 1868: Carlow (2 seats)
| Party | Candidate | Votes | % | ±% |
|---|---|---|---|---|
| Irish Conservative | Henry Bruen | Unopposed | | |
| Irish Conservative | Arthur MacMurrough Kavanagh | Unopposed | | |
| Registered electors | | 2,309 | | |
| Conservative hold | | | | |
| Conservative hold | | | | |

=== Elections in the 1870s ===
General election 1874: Carlow (2 seats)
| Party | Candidate | Votes | % | ±% |
|---|---|---|---|---|
| Irish Conservative | Arthur MacMurrough Kavanagh | Unopposed | | |
| Irish Conservative | Henry Bruen | Unopposed | | |
| Registered electors | | 2,180 | | |
| Conservative hold | | | | |
| Conservative hold | | | | |

=== Elections in the 1880s ===
General election 1880: County Carlow (2 seats)
| Party | Candidate | Votes | % | ±% |
|---|---|---|---|---|
| Home Rule | Edmund Dwyer Gray | 1,224 | 33.0 | New |
| Home Rule | Donald Horne Macfarlane | 1,143 | 30.8 | New |
| Irish Conservative | Arthur MacMurrough Kavanagh | 714 | 19.2 | N/A |
| Irish Conservative | Henry Bruen | 633 | 17.0 | N/A |
| Majority | | 429 | 11.6 | N/A |
| Turnout | | 1,857 (est) | 84.0 (est) | N/A |
| Registered electors | | 2,212 | | |
| Home Rule gain from Irish Conservative | | Swing | N/A | |
| Home Rule gain from Irish Conservative | | Swing | N/A | |

General election 3 December 1885: Carlow
| Party | Candidate | Votes | % | ±% |
|---|---|---|---|---|
| Irish Parliamentary | Edmund Dwyer Gray | 4,801 | 86.5 | +22.7 |
| Irish Conservative | Thomas Pierce Butler | 751 | 13.5 | −22.7 |
| Majority | | 4,050 | 73.0 | +45.4 |
| Turnout | | 5,552 | 80.6 | −3.4 |
| Registered electors | | 6,891 | | |
| Irish Parliamentary hold | | Swing | +22.8 | |

- Gray elects to sit for Dublin St Stephen's Green

By-election 29 January 1886: Carlow
| Party | Candidate | Votes | % | ±% |
|---|---|---|---|---|
| Irish Parliamentary | John Aloysius Blake | Unopposed | | |
| Registered electors | | 6,891 | | |
| Irish Parliamentary hold | | | | |

General election 3 July 1886: Carlow
| Party | Candidate | Votes | % | ±% |
|---|---|---|---|---|
| Irish Parliamentary | John Aloysius Blake | Unopposed | | |
| Registered electors | | 6,891 | | |
| Irish Parliamentary hold | | | | |

- Death of Blake

By-election 24 August 1887: Carlow
| Party | Candidate | Votes | % | ±% |
|---|---|---|---|---|
| Irish Parliamentary | James Patrick Mahon | Unopposed | | |
| Registered electors | | 7,643 | | |
| Irish Parliamentary hold | | | | |

=== Elections in the 1890s ===
- Death of the O’Gorman Mahon

By-election 7 July 1891: Carlow
| Party | Candidate | Votes | % | ±% |
|---|---|---|---|---|
| Irish National Federation | John Hammond | 3,755 | 70.9 | N/A |
| Irish National League | Andrew Kettle | 1,539 | 29.1 | N/A |
| Majority | | 2,216 | 41.8 | N/A |
| Turnout | | 5,294 | 75.5 | N/A |
| Registered electors | | 7,016 | | |
| Irish National Federation gain from Irish Parliamentary | | Swing | N/A | |

General election 12 July 1892: Carlow
| Party | Candidate | Votes | % | ±% |
|---|---|---|---|---|
| Irish National Federation | John Hammond | 3,738 | 82.1 | N/A |
| Liberal Unionist | Robert More McMahon | 813 | 17.9 | New |
| Majority | | 2,925 | 64.2 | N/A |
| Turnout | | 4,551 | 66.2 | N/A |
| Registered electors | | 6,874 | | |
| Irish National Federation gain from Irish Parliamentary | | Swing | N/A | |

General election 20 July 1895: Carlow
| Party | Candidate | Votes | % | ±% |
|---|---|---|---|---|
| Irish National Federation | John Hammond | 3,091 | 81.6 | −0.5 |
| Irish Unionist | Steuart James Charles Duckett | 685 | 18.4 | +0.5 |
| Majority | | 2,406 | 63.2 | −1.0 |
| Turnout | | 3,776 | 61.2 | −5.0 |
| Registered electors | | 6,168 | | |
| Irish National Federation hold | | Swing | −0.5 | |

=== Elections in the 1900s ===
General election 3 October 1900: Carlow
| Party | Candidate | Votes | % | ±% |
|---|---|---|---|---|
| Irish Parliamentary | John Hammond | Unopposed | | |
| Registered electors | | 6,454 | | |
| Irish Parliamentary hold | | | | |

General election 17 January 1906: Carlow
| Party | Candidate | Votes | % | ±% |
|---|---|---|---|---|
| Irish Parliamentary | John Hammond | Unopposed | | |
| Registered electors | | 5,831 | | |
| Irish Parliamentary hold | | | | |

Hammond's death causes a by-election.

By-election 3 February 1908: Carlow
| Party | Candidate | Votes | % | ±% |
|---|---|---|---|---|
| Irish Parliamentary | Walter MacMurrough Kavanagh | Unopposed | | |
| Registered electors | | 5,881 | | |
| Irish Parliamentary hold | | | | |

=== Elections in the 1910s ===
General election 20 January 1910: Carlow
| Party | Candidate | Votes | % | ±% |
|---|---|---|---|---|
| Irish Parliamentary | Michael Molloy | Unopposed | | |
| Registered electors | | 5,905 | | |
| Irish Parliamentary hold | | | | |

General election 9 December 1910: Carlow
| Party | Candidate | Votes | % | ±% |
|---|---|---|---|---|
| Irish Parliamentary | Michael Molloy | Unopposed | | |
| Registered electors | | 5,905 | | |
| Irish Parliamentary hold | | | | |

General Election 14 December 1918: Carlow
| Party | Candidate | Votes | % | ±% |
|---|---|---|---|---|
| Sinn Féin | James Lennon | Unopposed | | |
| Registered electors | | 16,133 | | |
| Sinn Féin gain from Irish Parliamentary | | | | |

== See also ==
- List of United Kingdom Parliament constituencies in Ireland and Northern Ireland
- Historic Dáil constituencies
