= Thomas Kavanagh (politician) =

Irish landowner and politician

Thomas Kavanagh, The MacMorrough (10 March 1767 – 20 January 1837) was an Irish landowner.

== Biography ==
He was the fourth son of Thomas Kavanagh of Borris, County Carlow by his wife Lady Susanna, daughter of Walter Butler, 16th Earl of Ormonde. He succeeded his elder brother Walter in the family estates in 1813.

He sat in the House of Commons of Ireland for Kilkenny from 1797 to 1799 and in the House of Commons of the United Kingdom for County Carlow from 1826 to 1831. He failed to be elected at the 1832 general election but sat for the county again from 1835 until his death.

He married artist Lady Harriet Kavanagh (née Trench) on 28 February 1825. The couple had three sons Charles, Thomas, Arthur, and one daughter, Harriet or "Hoddy." Their youngest son Arthur MacMurrough Kavanagh was born with vestigial limbs and Lady Harriet insisted he be raised with the same opportunities as their other children. Following Thomas' death Lady Harriet took their three youngest children travelling in the Middle East for two years.
