= Val Vousden =

- Born: 29 January 1885; College Street, Carlow, Ireland
- Died: 6 June 1951 (aged 66); Clonskea Hospital, Dublin
- Occupations: Poet, actor, playwright

Val Vousden or Bill MacNevin (29 January 1885 – 6 June 1951) was an Irish actor, poet, and playwright.

== Early life and family ==
Bill MacNevin was born William Francis Maher MacNevin on 29 Jan 1885 on College Street, Carlow, he was later known by his stage name Val Vousden. His mother, Eliza Maher, was a teacher in St Joseph's National School. He debuted on stage in 1891 as Tiny Tim in A Christmas Carol in Carlow Town Hall, going on appear in small productions under the guidance of Julia Kelly. He was schooled in the local Christian Brothers National School and Mungret College, Limerick, before joining the Royal Engineers as a clerk in 1904. He left the Engineers in 1905, being discharged on medical grounds, going on to join a drama troupe which toured Ireland and England, performing under the name Bartley Hynes. He returned to Carlow in 1910 to appear in the Deighton Hall on Burrin Street in Penny Readings. He later produced a sketch, Art and Laughter, in the Town Hall. He left again to tour with Carrickford Repertory Company until 1914. Vousden joined the army in 1914 at the outbreak of World War I, serving in France and rising to the rank of Regimental Sergeant Major of the Welsh Regiment. He married fellow actress, Pearl O'Donnell, touring the country performing together. The couple had three daughters, Sheila, Mona and Patricia.

== Acting career ==
Returning to Ireland, he joined Roberto Lena's company in Newbridge and then acted for a season with the Queens in Dublin, by which time he was using the stage name Val Vousden after 19th century Irish entertainer Valentine Vousden. For the next three years he was with the O'Brien and Ireland Company, working with May Craig and Peadar Kearney. After the advent of radio broadcasting in Ireland, Vousden presented the first light entertainment show, being a regular contributor to Irish radio until his death. He taught elocution lessons in a number of schools and colleges. He wrote a number of plays, sketches, and poems published as a volume entitled Recitations, Monologues, Character Sketches and Plays, and wrote his autobiography, Val Vousden's Caravan. Vousden regularly acted as part of the Abbey Players in the Abbey Theatre. He acted in a number of films, including Irish Destiny (1926), Captain Boycott (1947), Odd Man Out (1947), and Uncle Nick.

== Later life and legacy ==
Vousden died on 6 June 1951 in Clonskea Hospital, Dublin, and was buried in Glasnevin Cemetery. The 50th anniversary of his death was marked 9 June 2004 in the Carlow County Library.
