= Vousden =

Vousden is a surname. Notable people with the surname include:

- Karen Vousden (born 1957), British medical researcher
- Val Vousden (1885–1956), Irish actor, poet, and playwright
- William Vousden (1848–1902), Scottish Victoria Cross recipient and British Indian Army general
