= Hackettstown =

Hackettstown or Hacketstown may refer to:

- Hackettstown, New Jersey, a town in New Jersey, USA
- Hacketstown, a village in County Carlow, Ireland
