= R727 road =

R727 road may refer to:

- R727 road (Ireland)
- R727 road (South Africa)
