= R418 road (Ireland) =

Road in Ireland

R418 road
- Bóthar R418
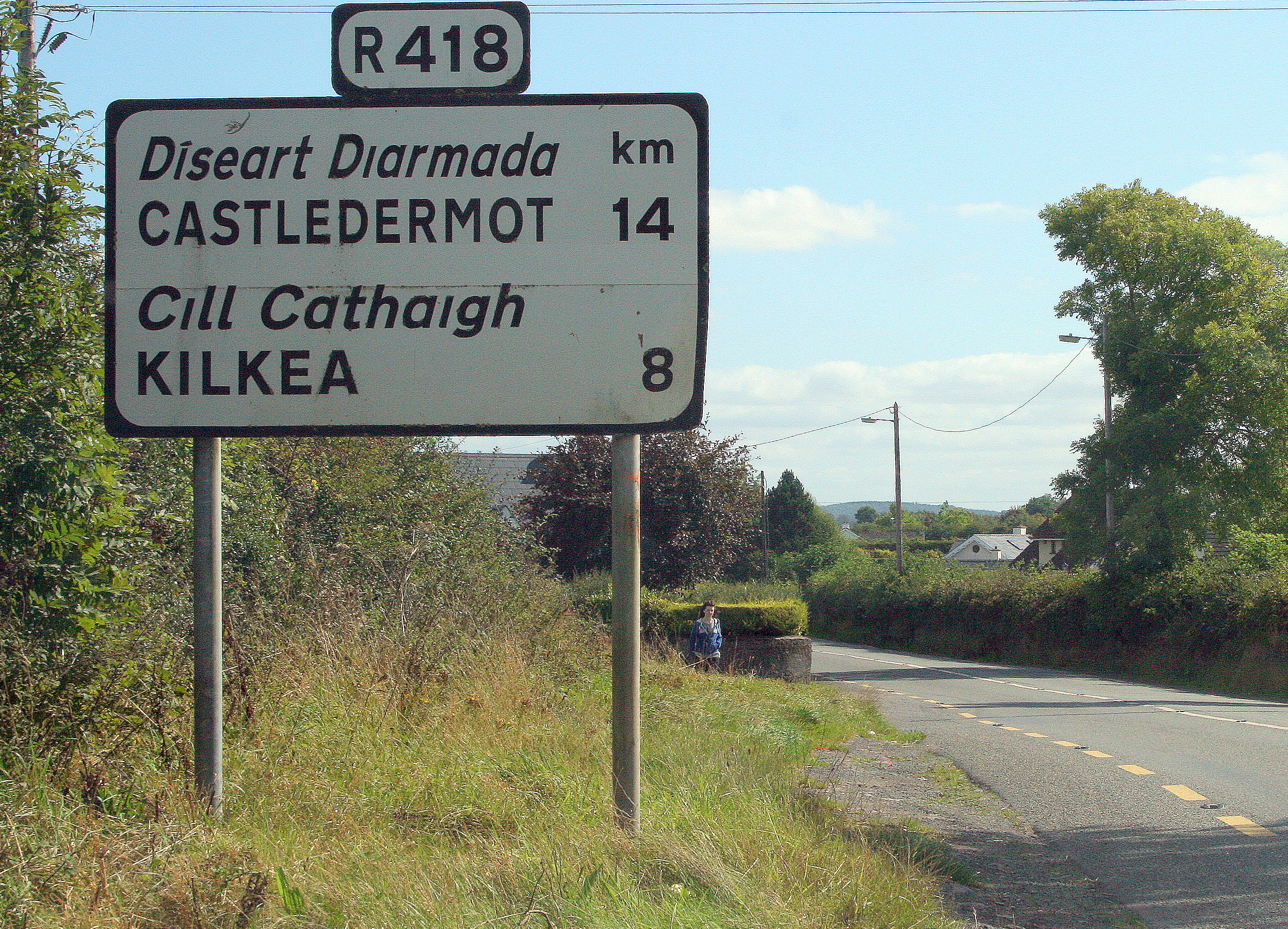

Route information
- Length: 60 km (37 mi)

Location
- Country: Ireland
- Primary destinations: County Kildare; Kilcullen leaves the R448; Athy – Joins/leaves the N78; Kilkea; Passes over the M9; Castledermot – Joins/leaves the R448; Crosses the River Lerr; County Carlow; Crosses the River Aghlona; Killerrig – (R726); Tullow, terminates near the N81 (via R725)

Highway system
- Roads in Ireland; Motorways; Primary; Secondary; Regional

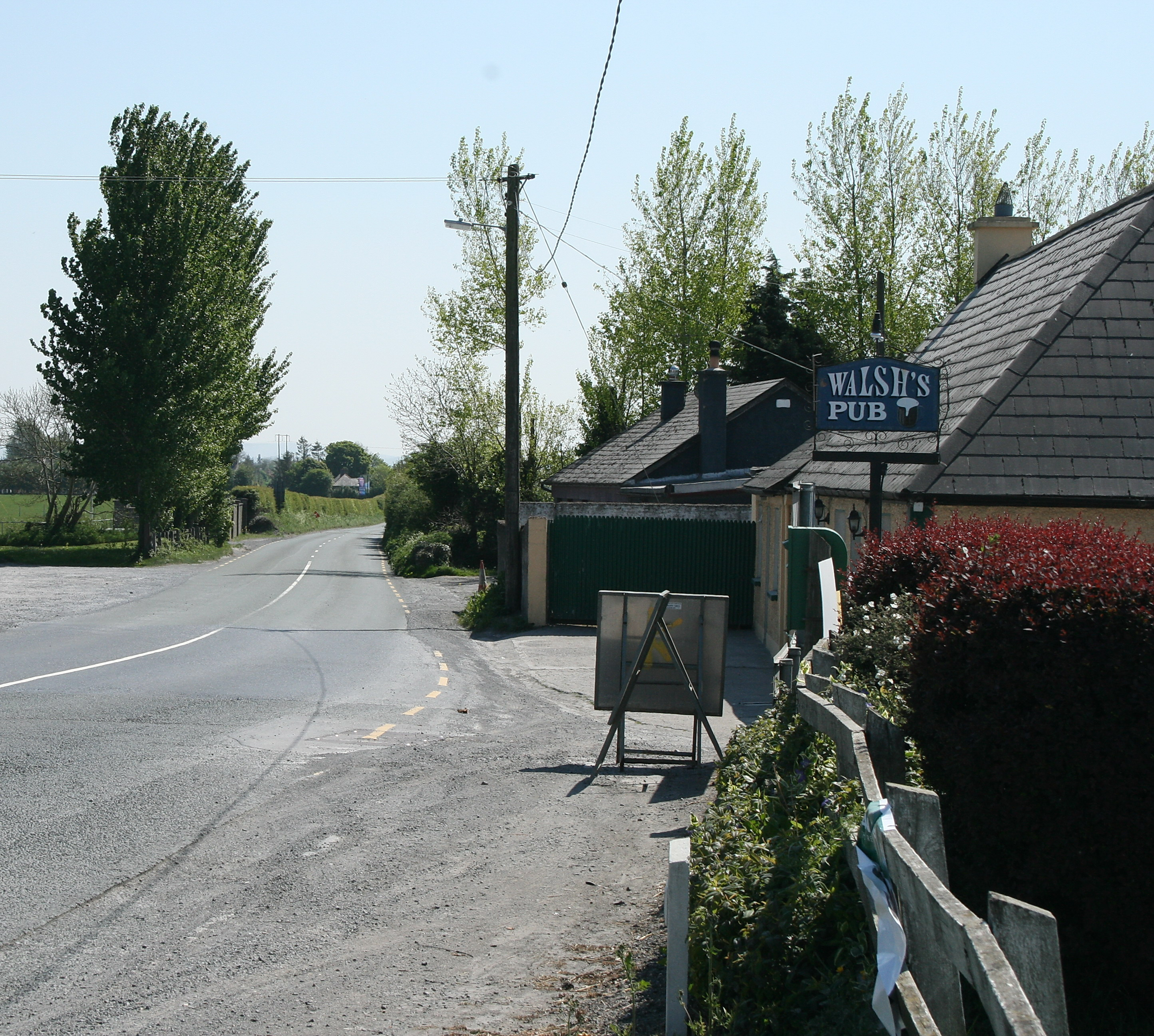
Killerrig Cross Roads

The R418 road is a regional road in Ireland, which runs north-south from the R448 at Kilcullen to Athy, County Kildare, and then to the N81 in Tullow, County Carlow.

En route it meets and shortly later leaves the N78 in the town of Athy, and also crosses R448 in the town of Castledermot. The section between Athy and Kilcullen was formerly part of the N78 until the latter was rerouted to Mullamast as part of the M9 motorway project.

The route is 60 km (37 mi) long.

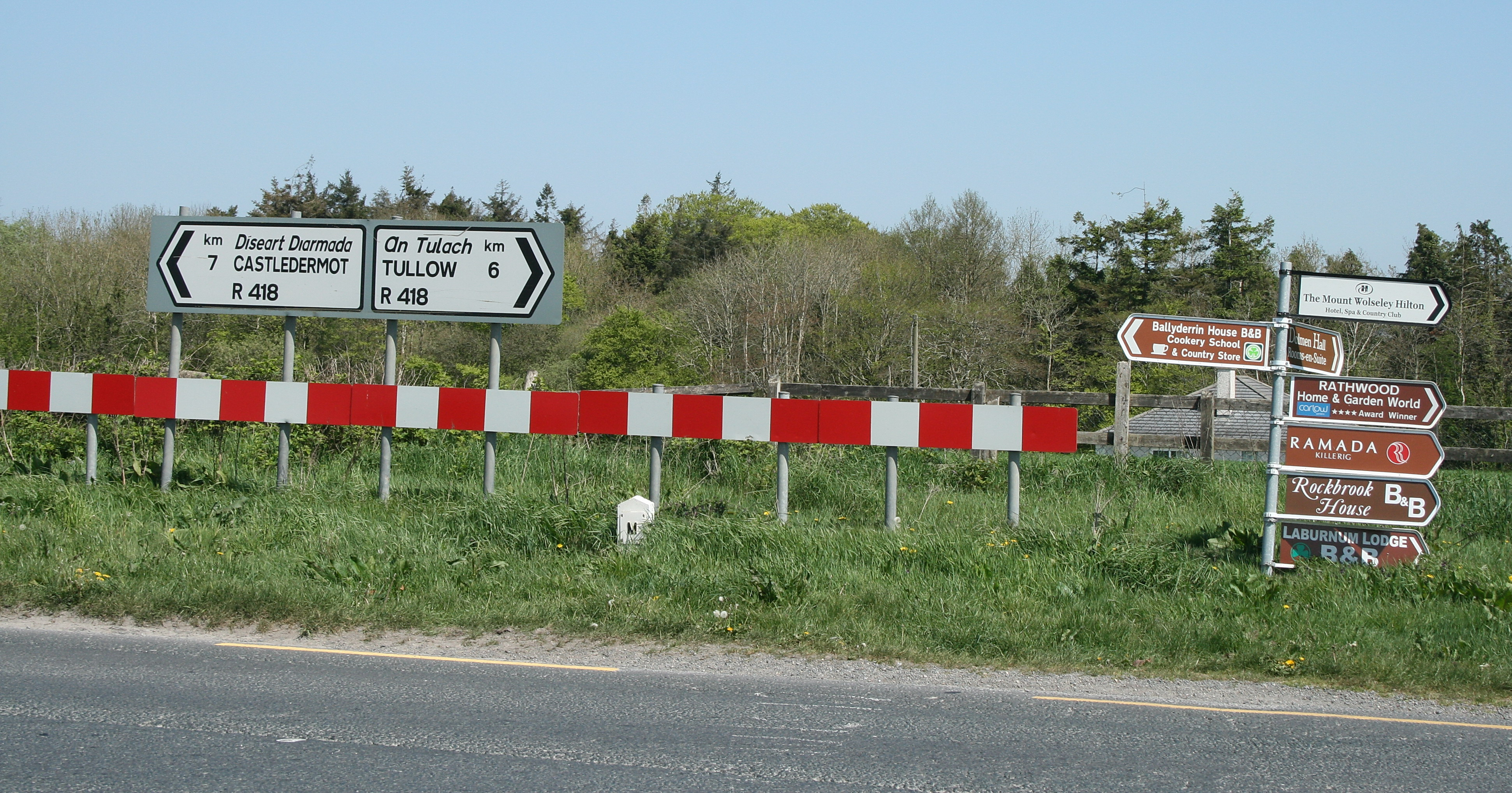
Killerrig Cross Roads

== See also ==
- Roads in Ireland
- National primary road
- National secondary road
