= Brownshill dolmen =

Dolmen in County Carlow, Ireland

Brownshill Dolmen
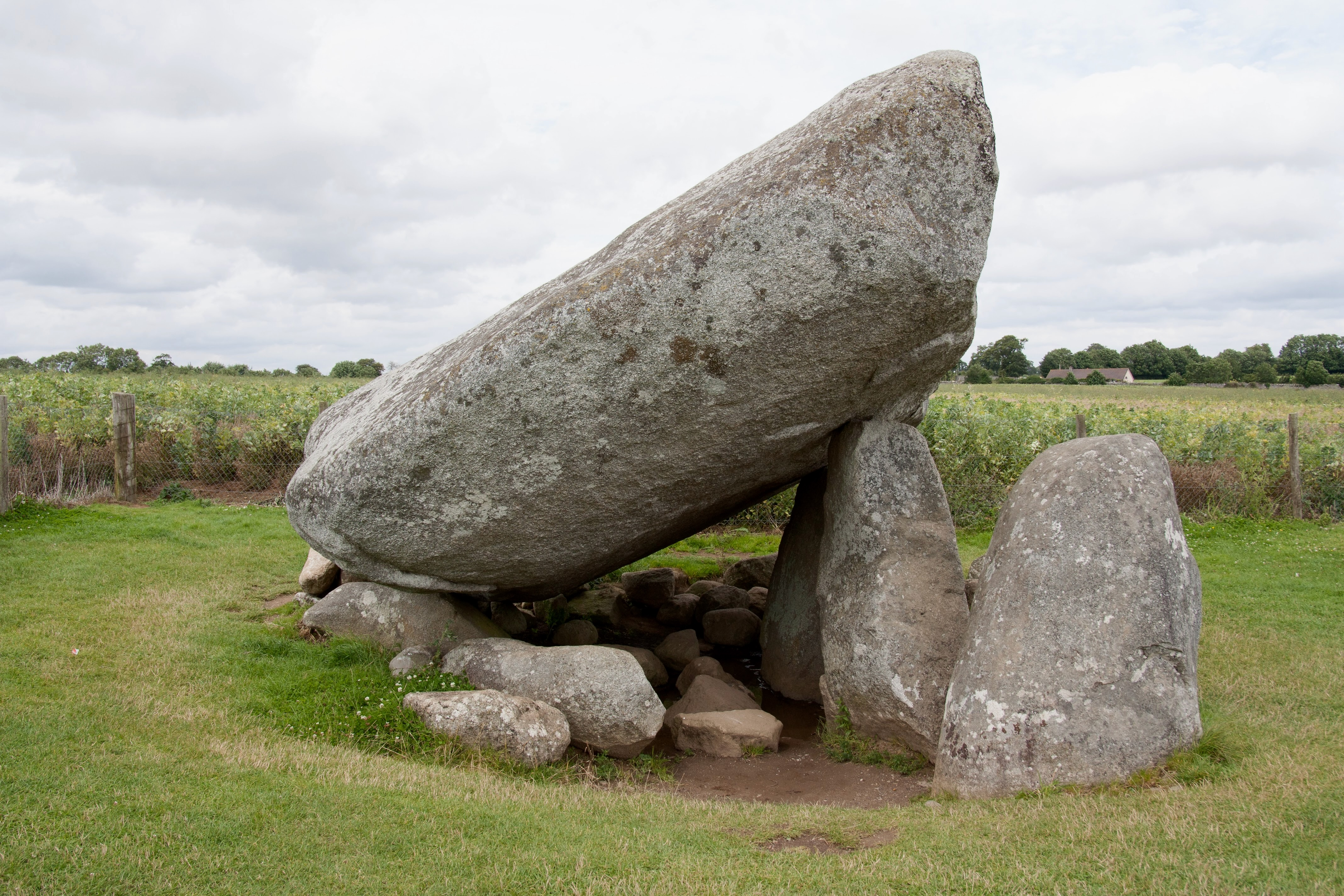
- The tomb in 2015

- Location in Ireland
- 52.837337°N 6.881004°W
- Type: Portal tomb
- Periods: Megalithic
- Location: County Carlow, Ireland

History
- Built: c. 3500 BC

Site notes
- Material: Stone
- Height: 3.5 m (11 ft)
- Length: 6.1 m (20 ft)
- Width: 4.7 m (15 ft)
- Owner: Public

National monument of Ireland
- Official name: Browneshill
- Reference no.: 613

Brownshill Dolmen (Irish: Dolmain Chnoc an Bhrúnaigh) is a very large megalithic portal tomb situated 3 km east of Carlow, in County Carlow, Ireland. Its capstone weighs an estimated 150 metric tons, and is reputed to be the heaviest in Europe. This dolmen has three large uprights and two recumbent stones at the other end. The tomb is listed as a National Monument. Known as the Kernanstown Cromlech, sometimes spelled as Browneshill Dolmen, it is sited on the former estate house of the Browne family from which it takes its name.

It lies just off the R726 road regional road and is clearly visible from the road.

The tomb was built between 4000 and 3000 BC. It is distinguished for the flanking of its burial chamber with two large upright stones (orthostats) supporting the granite capstone (roof) of the chamber. The capstone is thought to have been covered by an earthen mound and a gate stone blocked the entrance. At Brownshill both portal stones and the gate-stone are still in situ; the capstone lies on top of the portals and gate-stone and slopes to the ground away from the entrance.

The dolmen has not been excavated. A nearby fourth upright stone stands close by and might be the remains of a forecourt.

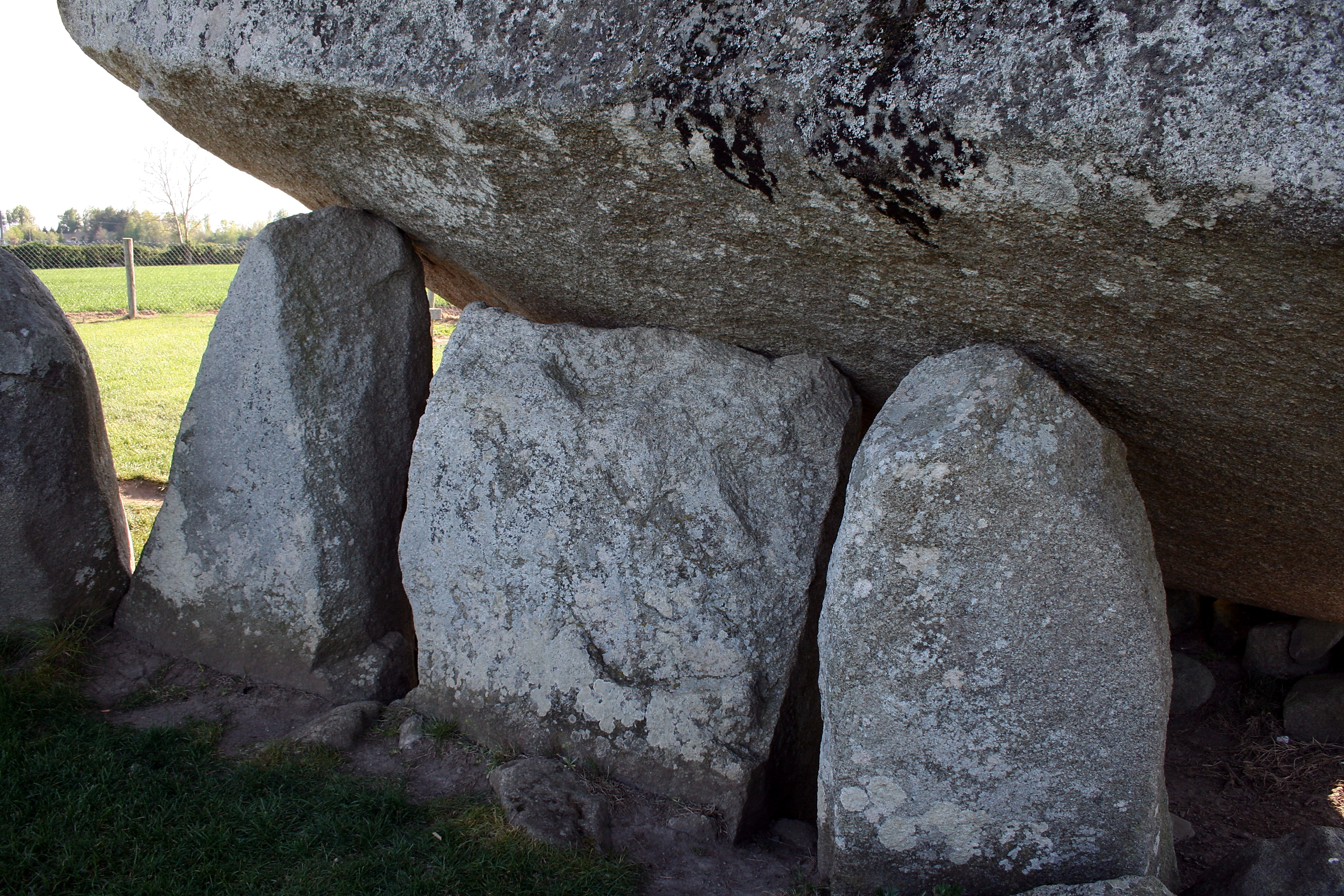
Gate-stone flanked by the two portal stones supporting the capstone

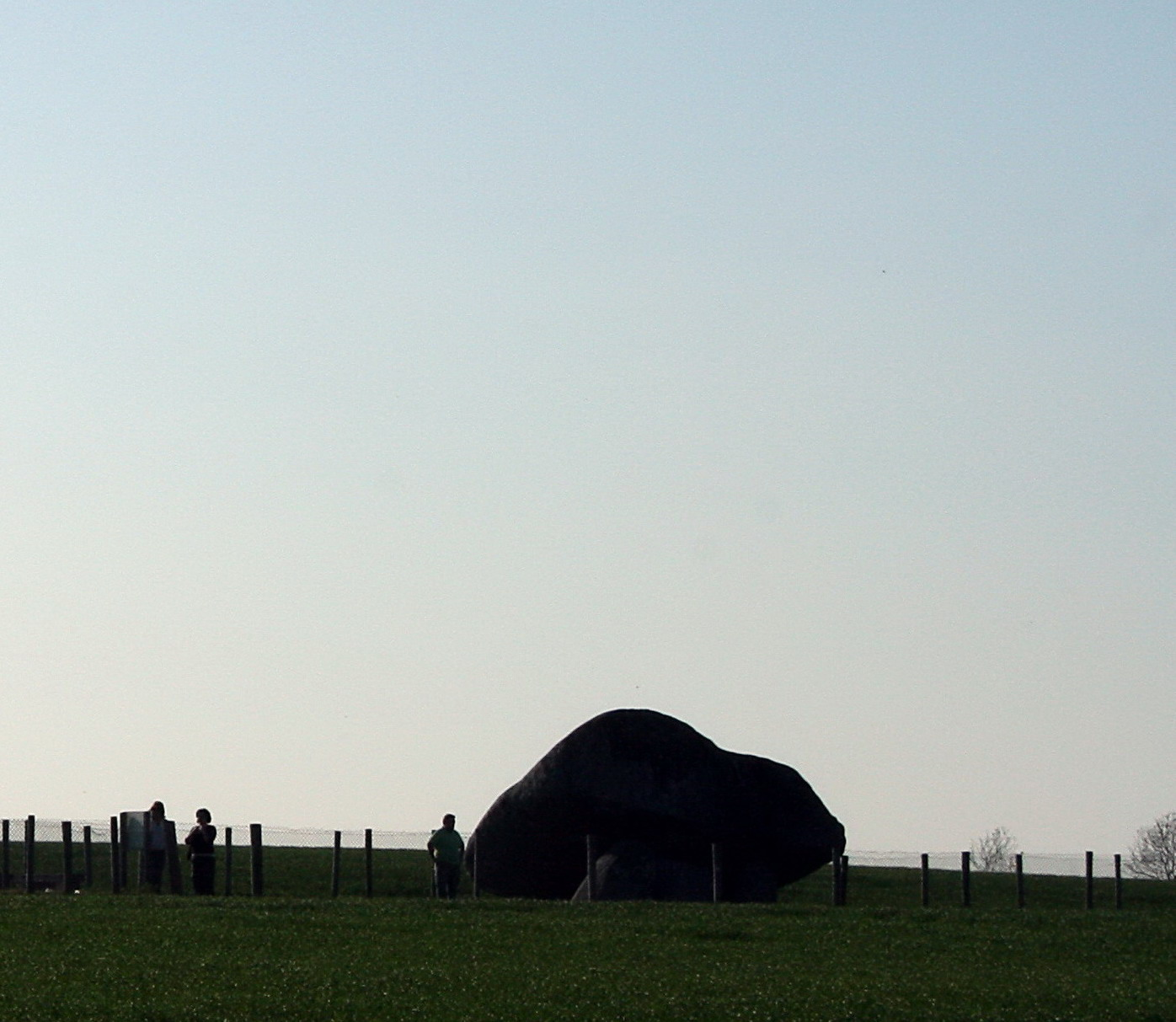
Relative size, as seen from the road
