= Carlow =

Town in County Carlow, Ireland

Carlow Ceatharlach (Irish)
- Town
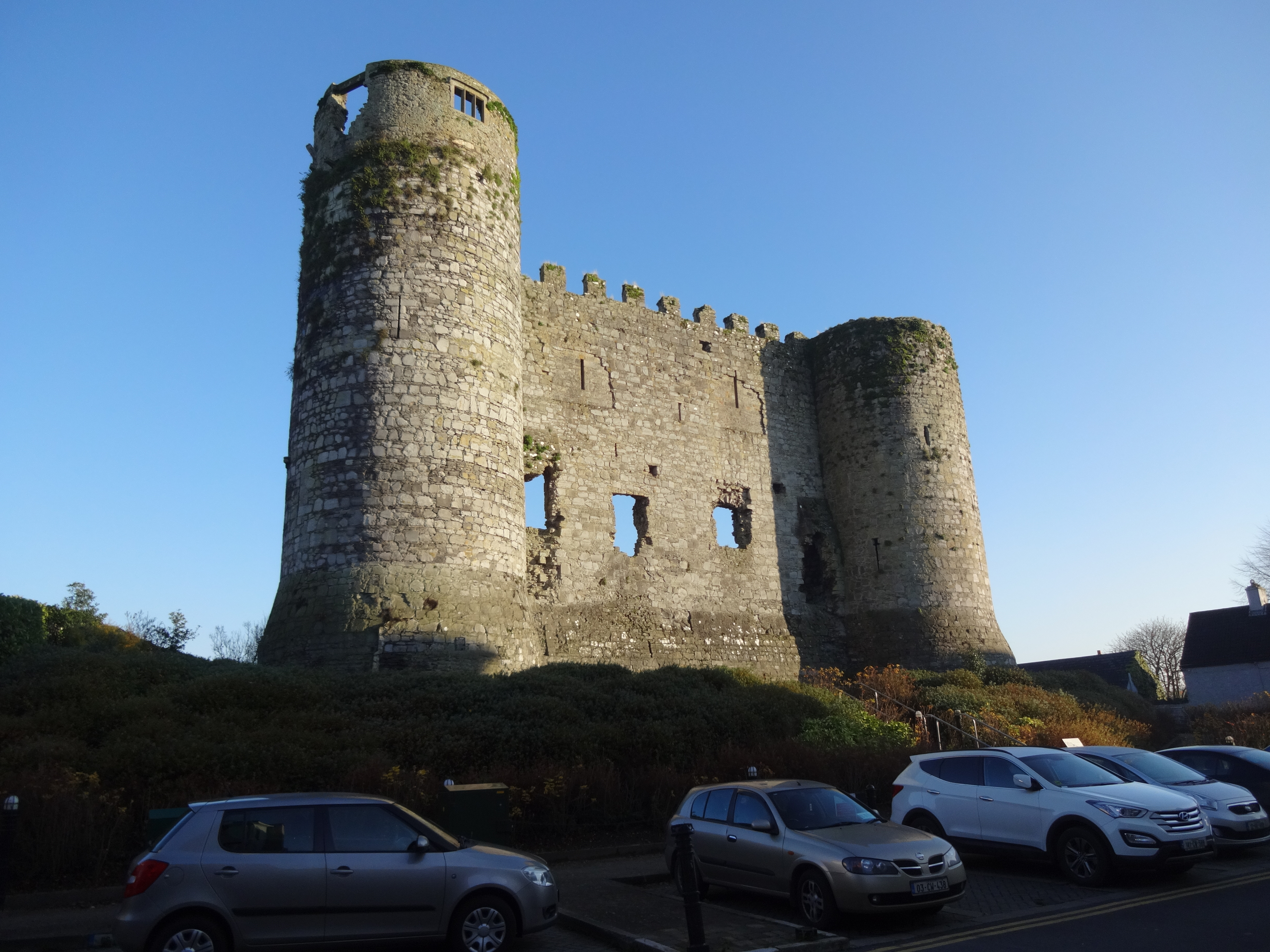
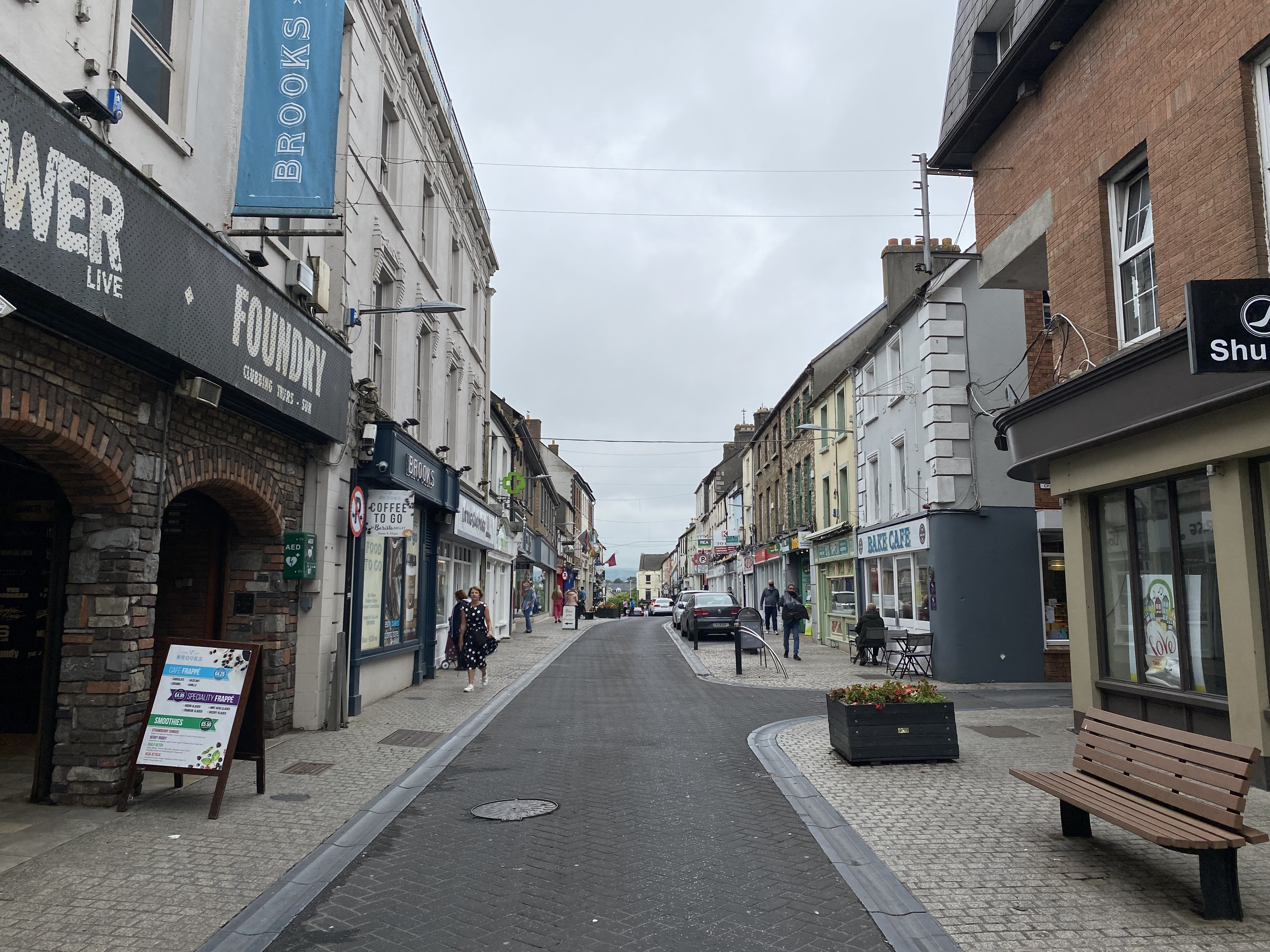
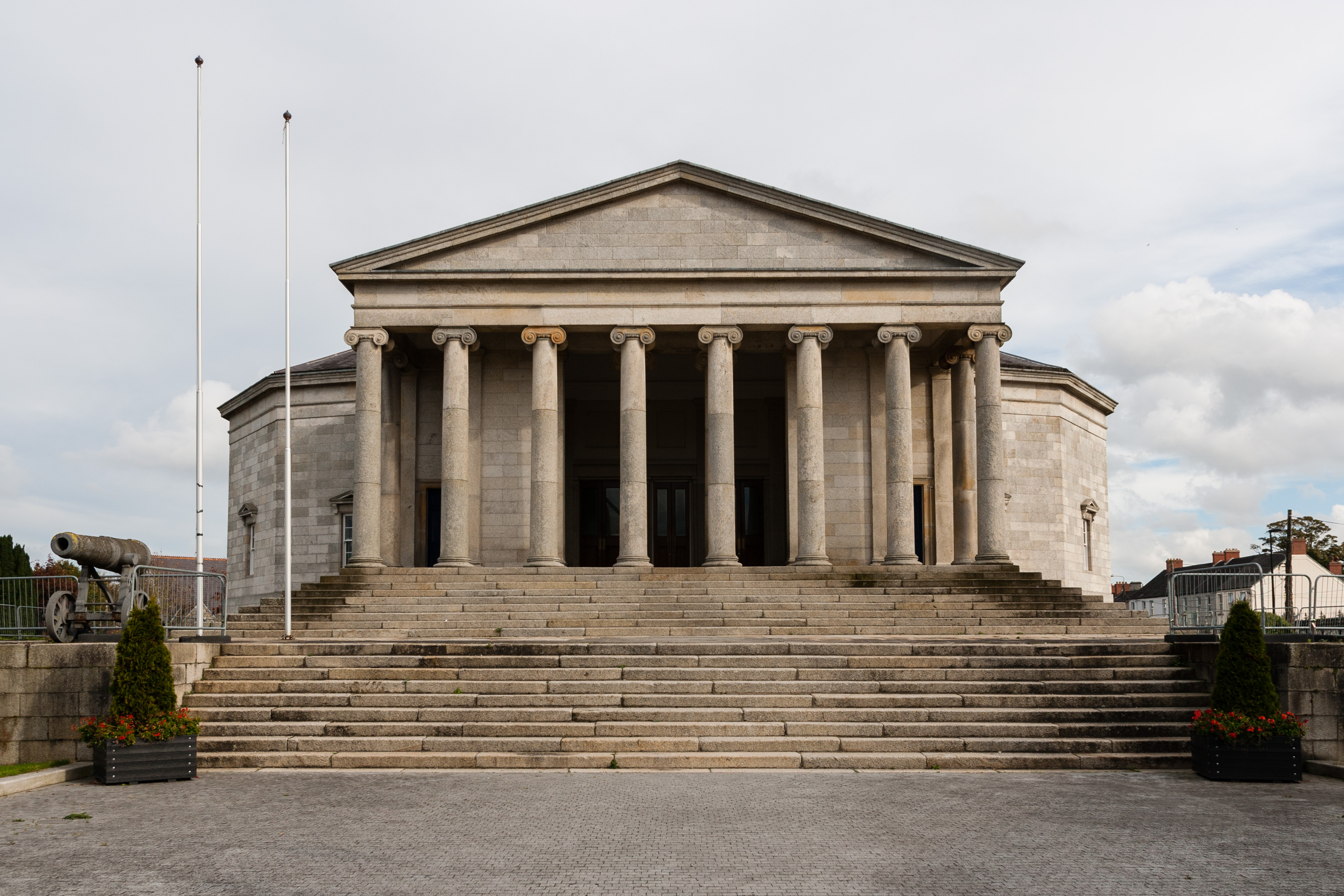
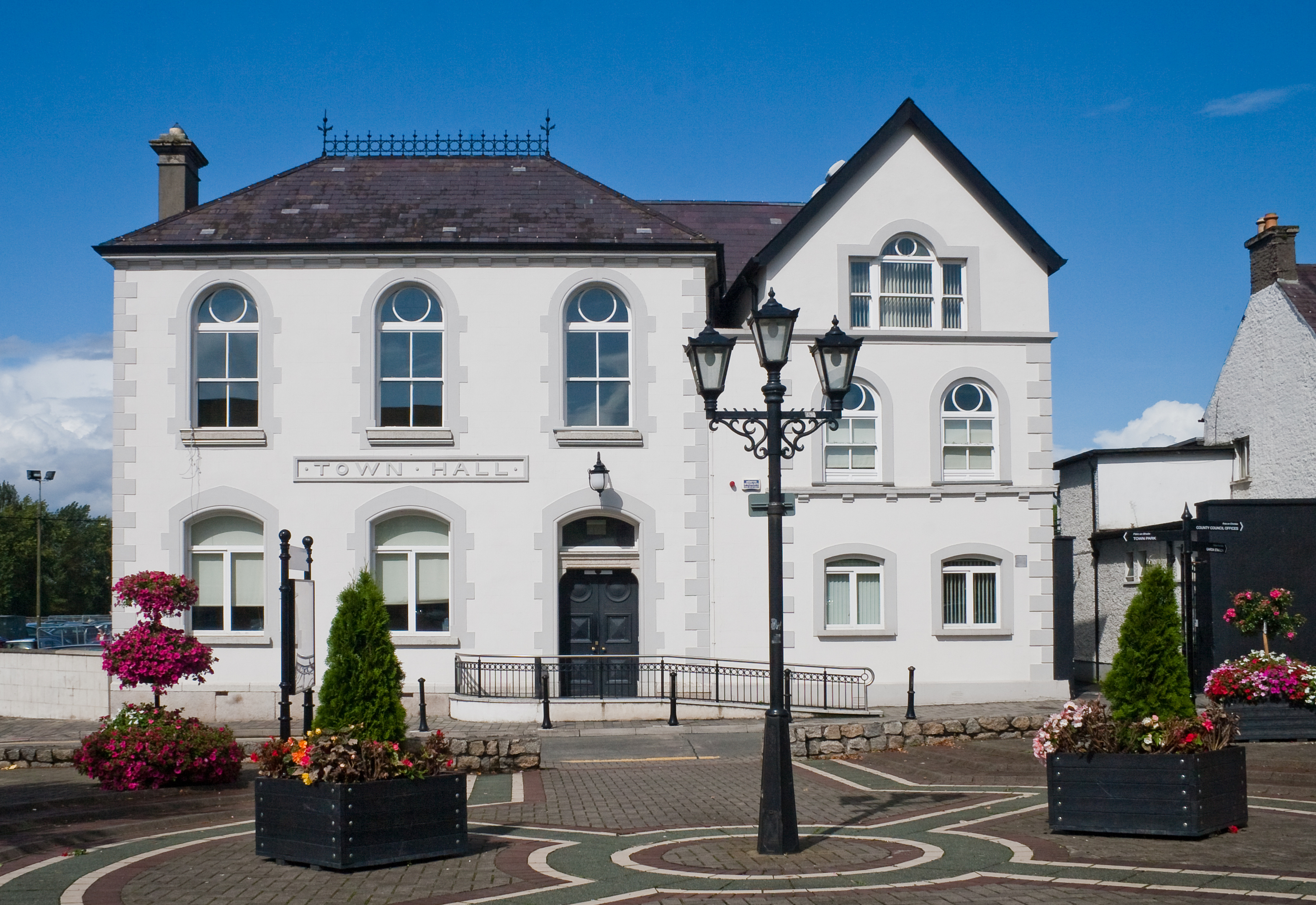
- Carlow Castle Tullow Street Carlow Courthouse Carlow Town Hall

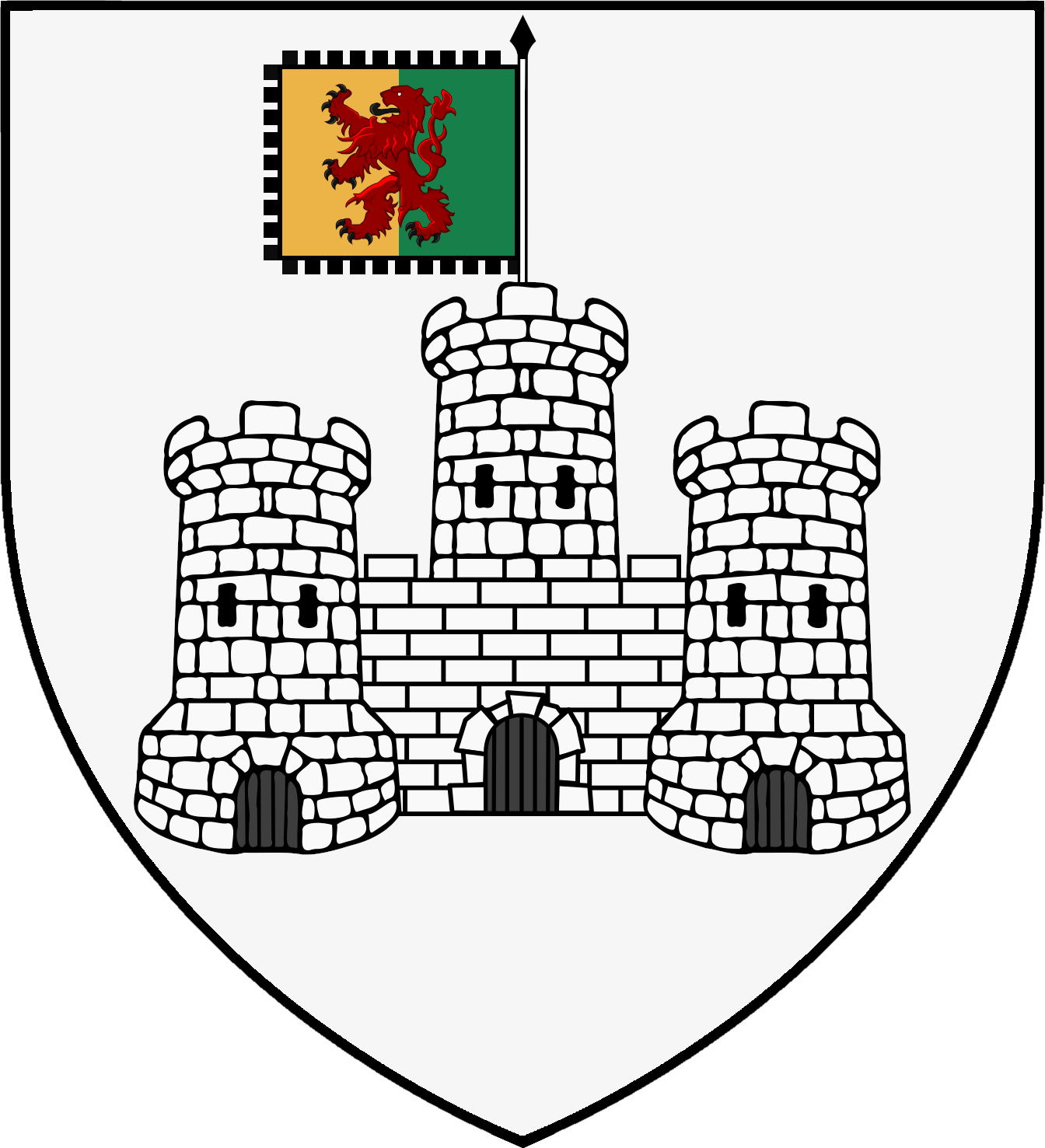
- Coat of arms

- Location in Ireland Carlow (Europe)
- Coordinates: 52.8306°N 6.9317°W
- Country: Ireland
- Province: Leinster
- County: County Carlow

Government
  - Type: Carlow Municipal District
  - Mayor: Fintan Phelan
  - Dáil constituency: Carlow–Kilkenny

Area
  - Total: 11.8 km^{2} (4.6 sq mi)
- Elevation: 57 m (187 ft)

Population (2022)
  - Total: 27,351
  - Rank: 12th
  - Density: 2,320/km^{2} (6,000/sq mi)
- Time zone: UTC±0 (WET)
  - Summer (DST): UTC+1 (IST)
- Eircode routing key: R93
- Telephone area code: +353(0)59
- Irish Grid Reference: S724771
- Website: www.carlow.ie

Carlow (/ˈkɑːrloʊ/ KAR-loh; Irish: Ceatharlach [ˈcahəɾˠl̪ˠəx]) is the county town of County Carlow, in the south-east of Ireland, 84 km (52 mi) from Dublin. At the 2022 census, it had a population of 27,351, the twelfth-largest urban centre in Ireland.

The River Barrow flows through the town and forms the historic boundary between counties Laois and Carlow. However, the Local Government (Ireland) Act 1898 included the town entirely in County Carlow. The settlement of Carlow is thousands of years old and pre-dates written Irish history. The town has played a major role in Irish history, serving as the capital of the country in the 14th century. The town is in a townland and civil parish of the same name.

== Etymology ==
The name is an anglicisation of the Irish Ceatharlach. Historically, it was anglicised as Caherlagh, Caterlagh and Catherlagh, which are closer to the Irish spelling. According to logainm.ie, the first part of the name derives from the Old Irish word cethrae ("animals, cattle, herds, flocks"), which is related to ceathar ("four") and therefore signified "four-legged". The second part of the name is the ending -lach, that makes abstract collective nouns.

Some believe that the name should be Ceatharloch (meaning "quadruple lake"), since ceathar means "four" and loch means "lake". It is directly translated as "Four lakes", although, there is seemingly no evidence to suggest that these lakes ever existed in this area.

== History ==
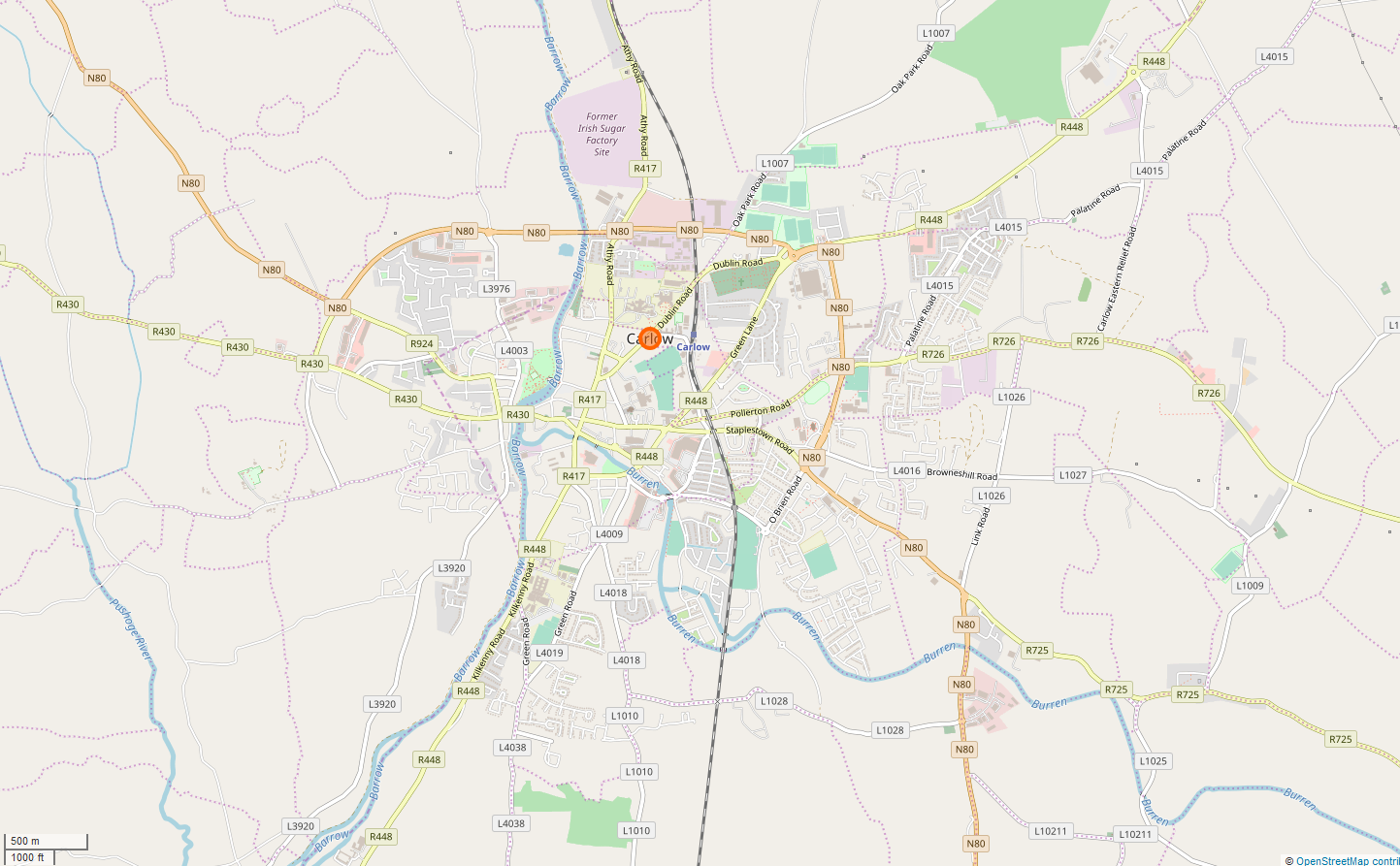
A map of Carlow

Historical population
Year	Pop.	±%
1813	6,146	—
1821	8,035	+30.7%
1831	9,114	+13.4%
1841	10,409	+14.2%
1851	8,690	−16.5%
1861	8,344	−4.0%
1871	7,842	−6.0%
1881	7,185	−8.4%
1891	6,619	−7.9%
1901	6,513	−1.6%
1911	6,619	+1.6%
1926	7,163	+8.2%
1936	7,649	+6.8%
1946	7,466	−2.4%
1951	7,667	+2.7%
1956	8,445	+10.1%
1961	8,920	+5.6%
1966	9,765	+9.5%
1971	10,399	+6.5%
1981	13,164	+26.6%
1986	13,816	+5.0%
1991	14,027	+1.5%
1996	14,979	+6.8%
2002	18,487	+23.4%
2006	20,724	+12.1%
2011	23,030	+11.1%
2016	24,272	+5.4%
2022	27,351	+12.7%

Evidence shows that human occupation in the Carlow county area extends back thousands of years. The most notable and dramatic prehistoric site is the Browneshill Dolmen – a megalithic portal tomb just outside Carlow town.

Now part of the diocese of Kildare and Leighlin, several Early Christian settlements are still in evidence today around the county. St Mullin's monastery is believed to have been established around the 7th century, the ruins of which are still in evidence today. Old Leighlin was the site of one of the largest monastic settlements in Ireland and the location for a church synod in 630 AD which determined the date of Easter. St Comhgall built a monastery in the Carlow area in the 6th century, an old church building and burial ground survive today at Castle Hill known as Mary's Abbey. Carlow was an Irish stronghold for agriculture in the early 1800s which earned the county the nickname of the scallion eaters. Famine later wiped out half of the population.

Carlow Castle was constructed by William Marshal, Earl of Striguil and Lord of Leinster, c. 1207 – c. 1213, to guard the vital river crossing. It was also to serve as the capital of the Lordship of Ireland from 1361 until 1374. This imposing structure survived largely intact until 1814 when it was mostly destroyed in an attempt to turn the building into a lunatic asylum. The present remains now are the West Wall with two of its cylindrical towers.

Carlow was incorporated as a borough in 1296 by Edward I. The parliamentary borough returned two MPs to the Irish House of Commons until 1801 and its successor constituency returned one MP to the United Kingdom House of Commons from 1801 to 1885. The borough corporation was abolished under the Municipal Corporations (Ireland) Act 1840.

The bridge over the River Barrow, Graiguecullen Bridge, is agreed to date to 1569. The original structure was largely replaced and widened in 1815 when it was named Wellington Bridge in celebration of the defeat of Napoleon's army by the Duke of Wellington at the Battle of Waterloo in June of that year. The bridge was built across a small island in the river and a 19th-century house was constructed on the bridge – this was for a time occupied by the Poor Clares, an enclosed religious order who still have a convent in Graiguecullen.

Another convent belonging to the Presentation Order of nuns now houses the County Library and the Carlow County Museum. The cathedral, designed by Thomas Cobden, was the first Catholic cathedral to be built in Ireland after Catholic emancipation in 1829. Its construction cost £9,000 and was completed in 1833.

Saint Patrick's College, located beside the cathedral, dates from 1793. The college was established in 1782 to teach the humanities to both lay students and those studying for the priesthood. The Carlow Courthouse was constructed in the 19th century. There are still many old estates and houses in the surrounding areas, among them Ducketts Grove and Dunleckney Manor. St Mullin's today houses a heritage centre.

In 1703, the Irish House of Commons appointed a committee to bring in a bill to make the River Barrow navigable; by 1800 the River Barrow Track was completed between St. Mullin's and Athy, establishing a link to the Grand Canal which runs between Dublin and the Shannon.

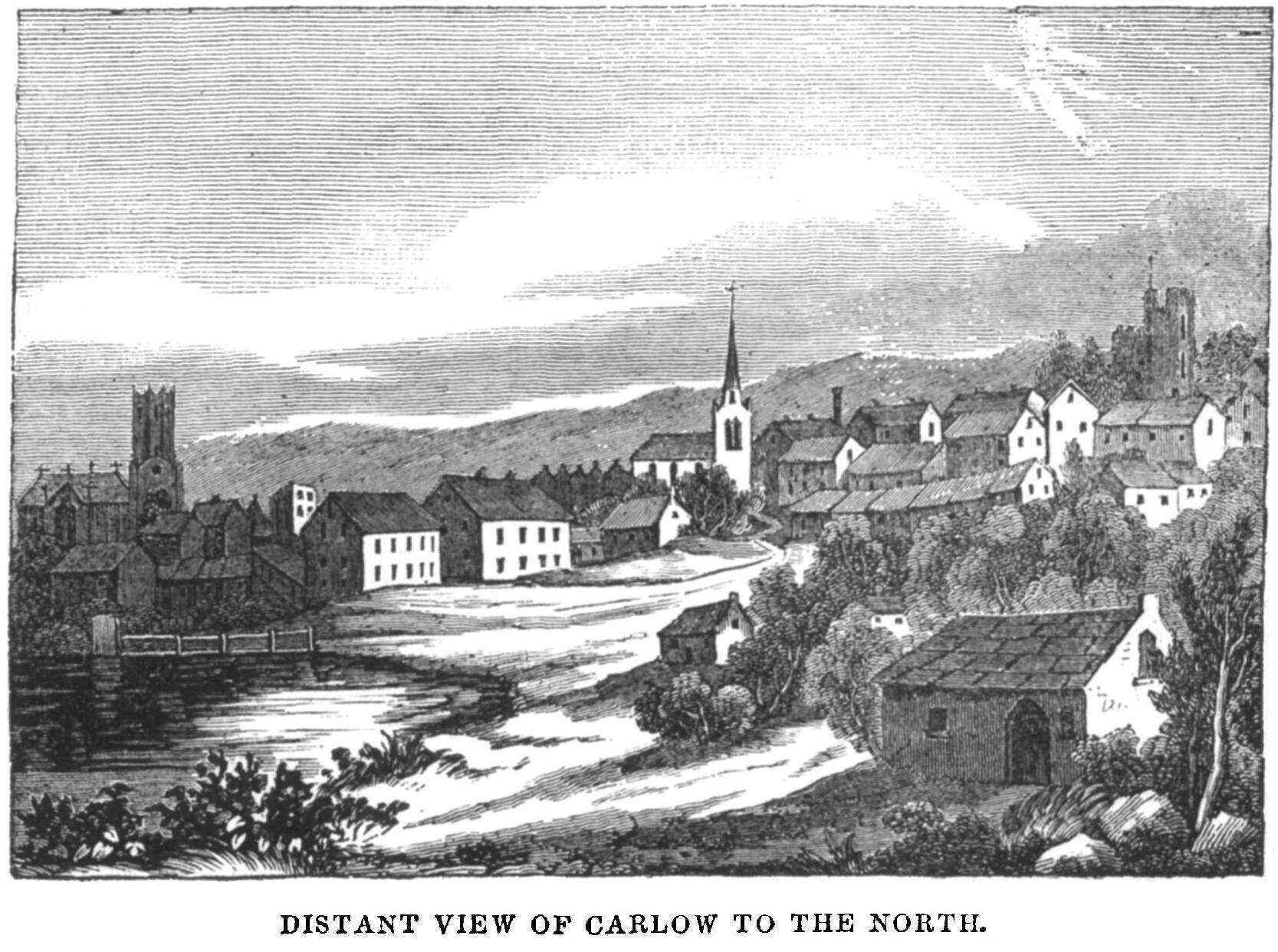
Distant view of Carlow to the north, Dublin Penny Journal, 1834

By 1845, 88,000 tons of goods were being transported on the River Barrow Navigation. Carlow was also one of the earliest towns to be connected by train.

The Great Southern and Western Railway had opened its mainline as far as Carlow in 1846, and this was extended further to Cork in 1849. The chief engineer, William Dargan, originally hailed from Killeshin, just outside Carlow. At the peak of rail transport in Ireland, Carlow county was also served by a line to Tullow.

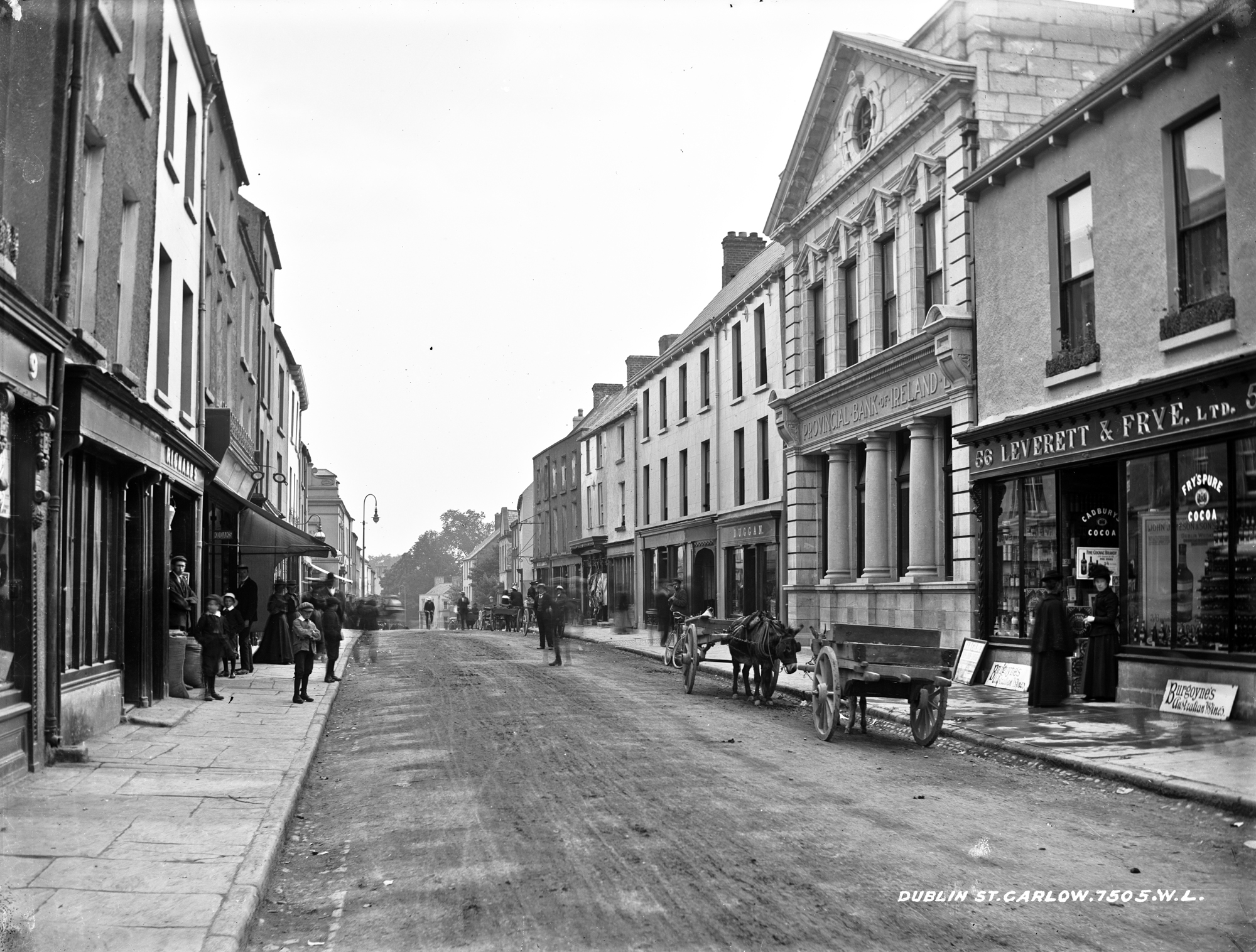
Dublin Street, Carlow circa 1900

Public supply of electricity in Carlow was first provided from Milford Mills, approximately 8 km south of Carlow, in 1891. Milford Mills still generates electricity feeding into the national grid. Following independence in the early 1920s, the new government of the Irish Free State decided to establish a sugar-processing plant in Leinster. Carlow was chosen as the location due to its transport links and large agricultural hinterland, favourable for growing sugar beet.

The town is recalled in the famous Irish folk song,"Follow Me Up to Carlow", written in the 19th century about the Battle of Glenmalure, part of the Desmond Rebellions of the late 16th century. In 1650, during the Cromwellian conquest of Ireland, Carlow was besieged and taken by English Parliamentarian forces, hastening the end of the Siege of Waterford and the capitulation of that city.

During the 1798 rebellion, Carlow was the scene of a massacre of 600 rebels and civilians following an unsuccessful attack on the town by the United Irishmen, known as the Battle of Carlow. The Liberty Tree sculpture in Carlow, designed by John Behan, commemorates the events of 1798. The rebels slain in Carlow town are buried in the 'Croppies Grave', in '98 Street, Graiguecullen.

On 1 June 2025, Evan Fitzgerald fired shots in the Tesco at Fairgreen Shopping Centre in the town, which resulted in his death and the injury to a young girl while fleeing the shots. The sounds of shots were captured on a nearby barber's CCTV. Armed local police responded as well as bomb disposal units. This event is notable as it is one of the first known active shooter-style events in Ireland.

== Irish language ==
Until the early-19th century, Irish was spoken in all twelve counties of the province of Leinster, of which County Carlow forms part. According to Celtic scholar Nicholas Williams, the Irish spoken in County Carlow seems to have belonged to a central dialect stretching from west Connacht eastwards to the Liffey estuary. It had characteristics which survive today only in Connacht Irish.

It preserved the stress pattern of Old Irish in which the first syllable of a word receives strong stress. Evidence from place names suggests that Old Irish cn- had become "cr-" in parts of Carlow, like all Gaelic speech outside of Munster and Ossory. An example from Carlow is "Crukeen" (Cnoicín). West Carlow seems to have pronounced "slender R" as "slender Z" (like the "s" in "treasure" or "pleasure") which is also a well-attested feature of the (now extinct) traditional dialects of Kilkenny and South Laois.

Efforts are now being made to increase the use of Irish in Carlow under the aegis of the organisation Glór Cheatharlach. Carlow has two schools which teach through Irish: a Gaelscoil (primary) founded in 1982 and a Gaelcholáiste (secondary) founded in 1990. Both schools are at full capacity and supplemented by an Irish-speaking pre-school or Naíonra. There is also an intensive Irish-language summer course for students from English-speaking schools. It has been claimed by Bride de Roiste of Glór Cheatharlach that there is more Irish spoken in Carlow than in certain Gaeltacht districts.

== Places of interest ==
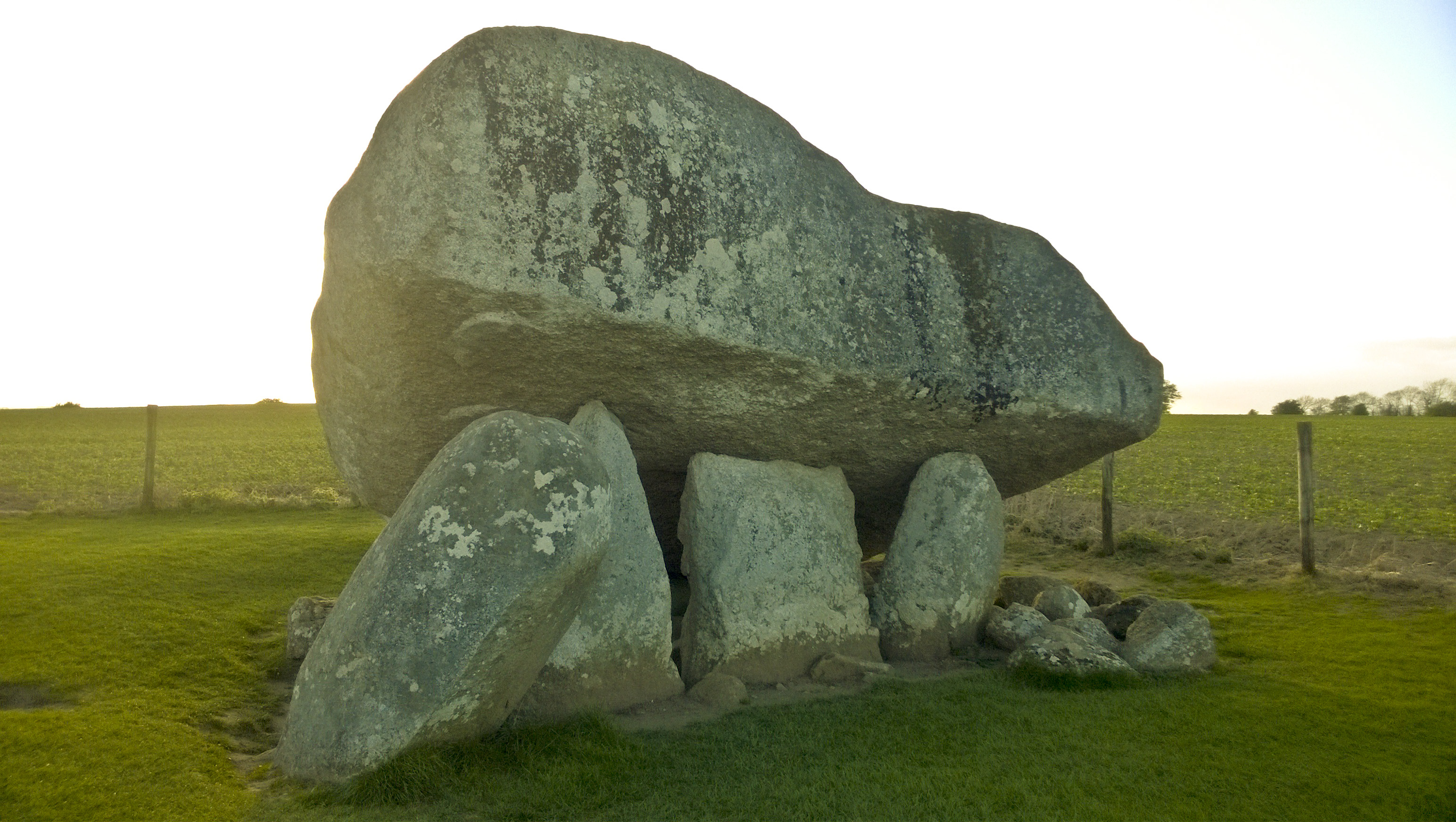
The Brownshill Dolmen

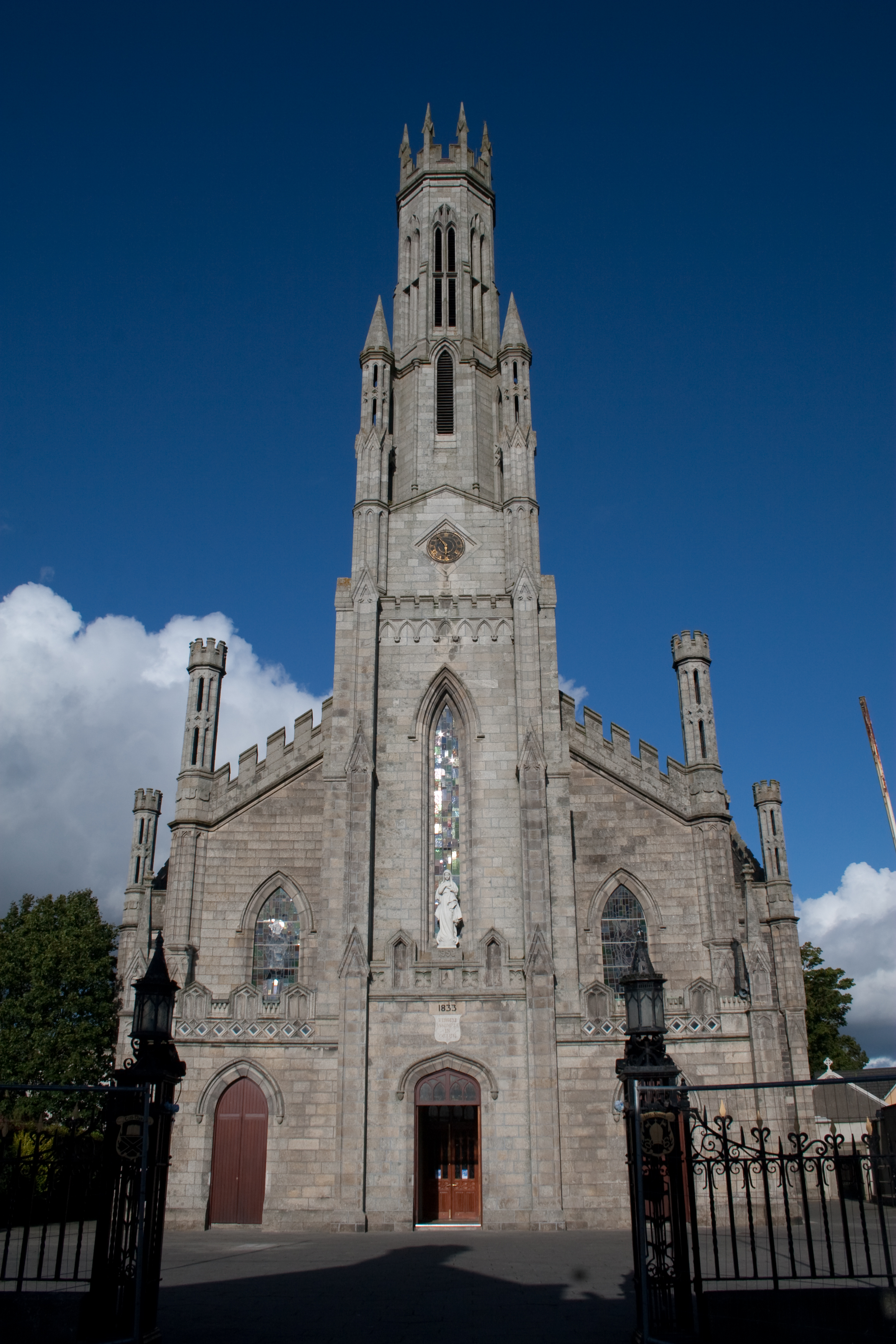
Carlow Cathedral

One of Carlow's most notable landmarks is the Brownshill Dolmen, situated on the Hacketstown Road (R726) approximately 5 km from Carlow town centre. The capstone of this dolmen is reputed to be the heaviest in Europe.

Milford is a green area on the River Barrow approximately 5 miles outside of Carlow town. It is notable as its home to Milford Mill, which was the first inland hydro-electrical plant in Ireland. It began supplying Carlow town with power in 1891.

The estate at Oak Park is located 3 kilometres (1.9 mi) north of Carlow.

Carlow Town Hall was completed in March 1886.

== Economy ==
Carlow industry has come a long way since the early 20th century when the town became the centre of Ireland's slow process of industrialisation with the creation of the Irish Sugar Company. Then at the cutting edge of industry in Ireland, the sugar factory opened in 1926 as a private enterprise and was eventually nationalised before reverting to private ownership. It closed on 11 March 2005 as the management of the parent company Greencore decided that it was no longer economical to run the factory nor was it viable to upgrade the facility. The country's last remaining sugar plant at Mallow, County Cork closed in 2006.

One of the traditional, principal employers in Carlow was OralB Braun, which had a large factory producing mostly hairdryers and electric toothbrushes; however, this closed in 2010. Burnside is also a large employer in the area; it produces hydraulic cylinders. The South East Technological University is also a significant employer in the town. Since opening its doors in October 2003 Fairgreen Shopping Centre has also played a large part in employment in the area; Tesco, Heatons, Next, New Look and River Island are the main tenants. Nonetheless, the town shares problems associated with other provincial towns in Ireland – the inability to attract significant new industry. Pharmaceutical giant Merck & Co. employs more than 500 people at its manufacturing campus in Carlow and is expanding with a new facility focused on oncology biologics.

== Climate ==
Carlow is in a maritime temperate oceanic region according to Köppen climate classification. It experiences cool winters, mild humid summers, and a lack of temperature extremes. Met Éireann records climate data for Carlow from their station at Oak Park, situated at 61 m (200 ft) above sea level. The coldest month is February, with an average minimum temperature of 2.1 °C (36 °F), and the hottest month is July, with an average maximum temperature of 21.3 °C (70 °F). The driest months are April and May, with 45 mm (2 in) and 50 mm (2 in) of rain respectively. The wettest month is November, with 98 mm (4 in) of rain on average. Humidity is high year-round and rainfall is evenly distributed throughout the year.

Climate data for Oak Park (3km north of Carlow), elevation: 61 m or 200 ft, 2004-2020 normals
Month	Jan	Feb	Mar	Apr	May	Jun	Jul	Aug	Sep	Oct	Nov	Dec	Year
Mean daily maximum °C (°F)	8.3 (46.9)	8.6 (47.5)	10.5 (50.9)	13.3 (55.9)	16.1 (61.0)	19.0 (66.2)	21.3 (70.3)	20.7 (69.3)	18.0 (64.4)	14.3 (57.7)	10.4 (50.7)	8.5 (47.3)	14.1 (57.3)
Mean daily minimum °C (°F)	2.3 (36.1)	2.1 (35.8)	2.6 (36.7)	4.4 (39.9)	6.9 (44.4)	9.6 (49.3)	11.5 (52.7)	11.2 (52.2)	9.3 (48.7)	7.0 (44.6)	4.0 (39.2)	2.5 (36.5)	6.1 (43.0)
Average precipitation mm (inches)	78.8 (3.10)	64.8 (2.55)	63.1 (2.48)	45.4 (1.79)	49.6 (1.95)	63.3 (2.49)	69.6 (2.74)	79.2 (3.12)	66.2 (2.61)	89.9 (3.54)	98.1 (3.86)	95.4 (3.76)	863.4 (33.99)
Average precipitation days (≥ 1 mm)	13	12	11	9	11	9	11	10	9	12	12	13	132
Source: Met Éireann

== Transport ==
The N9 road from Dublin to Waterford passed directly through the town until May 2008 when a bypass, part of the M9 motorway, was opened, greatly reducing traffic through the town. The N80 National secondary road skirts the edge of the town. The town is also connected to the national rail network. These transport links have helped Carlow to become a successful satellite town of Dublin in recent years.

Carlow railway station opened on 4 August 1846 and was closed for goods traffic on 9 June 1976; it remains open for public travel.

Carlow has a town bus service operated by Bus Éireann, consisting of two routes: the CW1 and CW2.

== Education ==
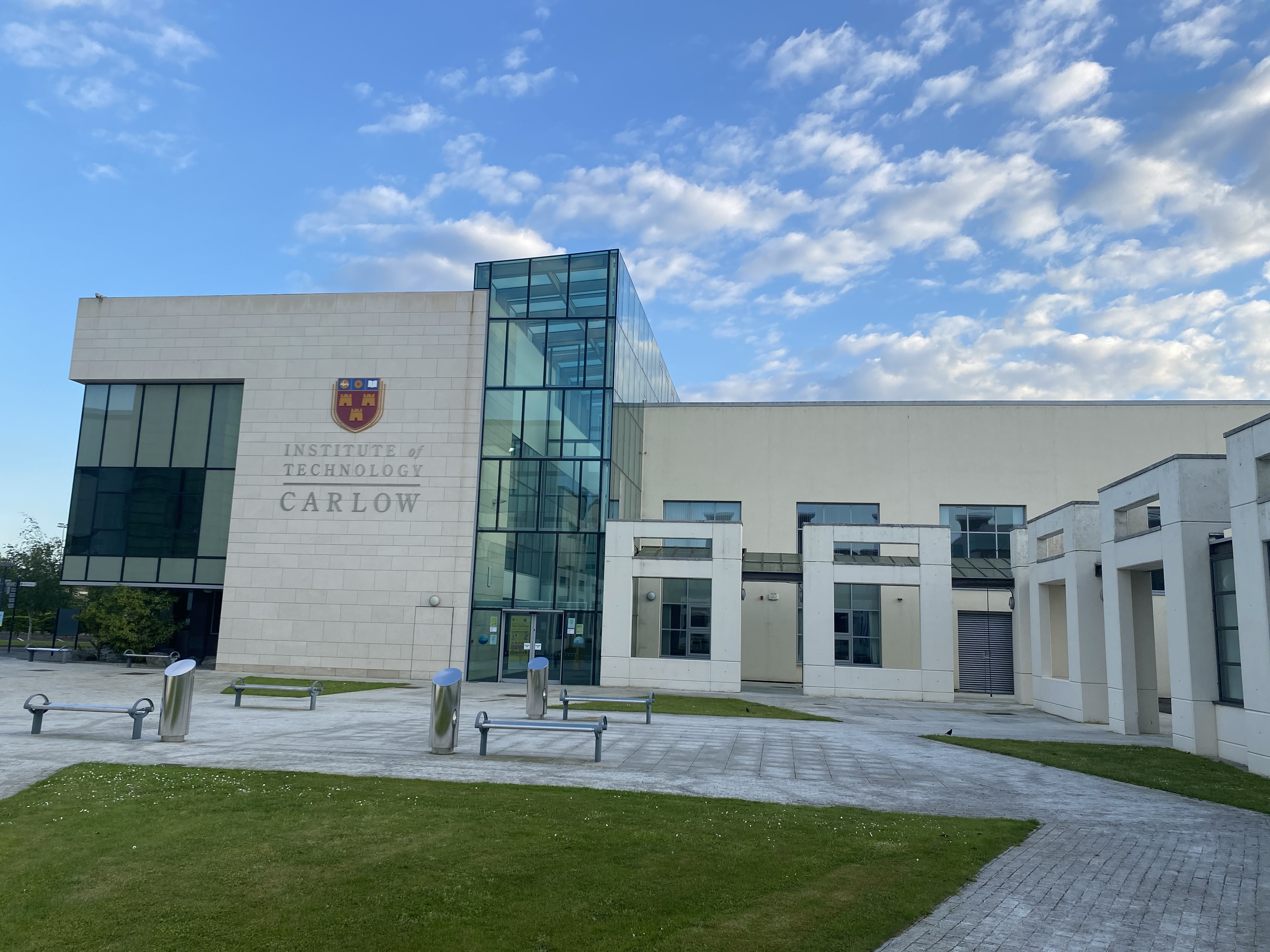
IT Carlow, Carlow campus

Secondary schools serving the area include Gaelcholáiste Cheatharlach, Tyndall College (including the former Carlow Vocational School), Tullow Community School, St. Mary's Academy CBS (Often regarded by locals as just CBS Carlow or The CBS), St Leo's College, and St Mary's Knockbeg College. There is also the post-leaving certificate Carlow Institute of Further Education.

Within the general vicinity of the town also lies Presentation College (often shortened to Pres) but is often considered by the local populace as not part of Carlow Town.

Third-level institutions include the South East Technological University, formerly the Institute of Technology, Carlow, and Carlow College.

The establishment of the South East Technological University has also helped drive growth in the area and encouraged many school leavers to remain in the town.

== Religion ==
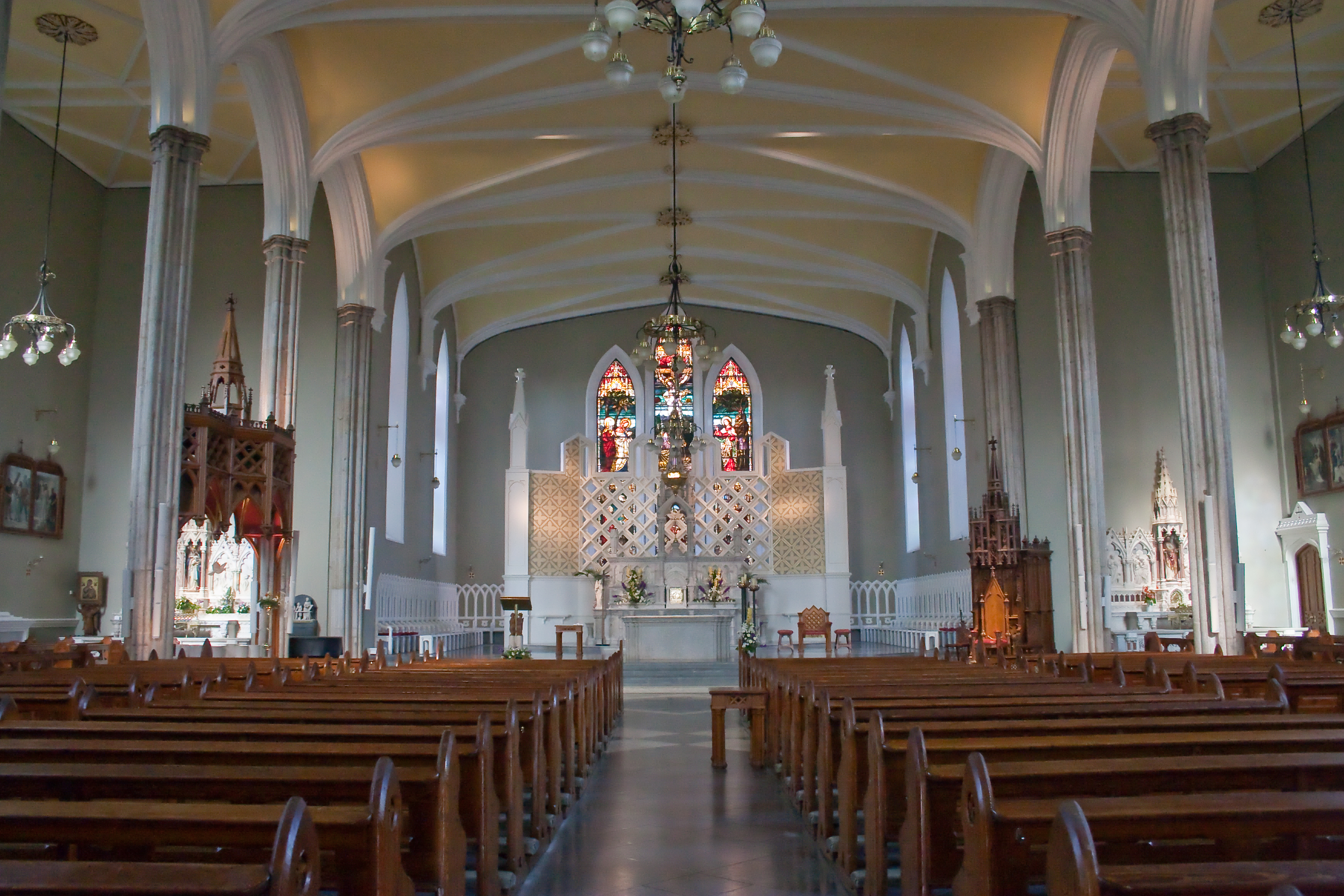
The nave of Carlow Cathedral

Carlow Cathedral, dedicated to Our Lady of Assumption, was started in 1828 and completed in 1833, in Gothic style. A sculpture by John Hogan is a memorial to the bishop and was finished in 1839.

An unidentified baby was left here on 22 January 2010.

== Media ==
The Nationalist is a newspaper which was established in 1883. The Carlow People is a free weekly newspaper.

Independent regional radio station KCLR 96FM (FM 96.9 MHz) serves the town.

== Sport ==
=== Motor racing ===
On 2 July 1903, the Gordon Bennett Cup ran through Carlow. It was the first international motor race to be held in Great Britain or Ireland. The Automobile Club of Great Britain and Ireland wanted the race to be hosted in the British Isles, Ireland was suggested as the venue because racing was illegal on British public roads. After some lobbying and changes to local laws, Kildare was chosen, partly because the straightness of its roads would be a safety benefit

As a compliment to Ireland, the British team chose to race in Shamrock green (Note: According to Leinster Leader, Saturday, 11 April 1903 Archived 10 March 2011 at the Wayback Machine, Britain had to choose a different colour to its usual national colours of red, white and blue, as these had already been taken by Italy, Germany and France respectively. It also stated red as the color for American cars in the 1903 Gordon Bennett Cup.) which thus became known as British racing green. The route consisted of several laps of a circuit passed-through Kilcullen, Kildare, Monasterevin, Stradbally, Athy, Castledermot and Carlow. The 328 miles (528 km) race was won by the Belgian racer Camille Jenatzy, driving a Mercedes.

=== Racquetball ===
The Carlow Racquetball club was set up in 1978. The club is one of only seven in the southeastern region and is the largest of these.

=== Clubs ===
GAA clubs in the area include Asca, Carlow Town, Éire Óg, Graiguecullen, O'Hanrahans & Setanta. Historically gaelic football has been stronger than hurling in the town. The Carlow Senior Football Championship has been won by clubs from the county town 62 times with Éire Óg winning half of them with 31 while O'Hanrahans and Graiguecullen have won 18 and 13 respectively. In 1926 Graiguecullen were expelled from Carlow GAA championships following an incident in that year's Carlow SFC final. The year after in 1927 they were invited to play in Laois GAA championships, Graiguecullen accepted the invitation and later that year they won the first of their 13 Laois Senior Football Championships. Carlow Town have won 10 Carlow Senior Hurling Championships.

County Carlow Football Club is the local rugby union club, while F.C. Carlow is a local association football club.

Carlow also has boxing clubs, an athletics club (St Laurence O'Toole Athletics Club), a karate club, a golf club, a rowing club, a tennis club, a hockey club and the Carlow Jaguar Scooter Club. Founded in 1979, the latter is one of the longest-running scooter clubs in Ireland or England.

== Notable people ==
- Pádraig Amond – Irish professional footballer who plays for Newport County
- Yvonne Barr – virologist, co-discoverer of the Epstein–Barr virus
- Sir John Bere (died 1617) – crown official, Burgess of Carlow and MP for Carlow 1613–15
- John Brettan (fl. 1358–1382) – baron of the Court of Exchequer
- Michael Farrell (1899–1962) – writer and broadcaster, remembered for his posthumous novel Thy Tears Might Cease
- John Gibbons – record producer, DJ
- Arthur MacMurrough Kavanagh (1831–1889) – politician
- John Lyons (1824–1867) – recipient of the Victoria Cross
- Seán O'Brien - Irish international rugby player
- John Augustine Sheppard (1849–1925) – monsignor, vicar general of the Roman Catholic Archdiocese of Newark
- Kathryn Thomas – television presenter for RTÉ
- Eoghan Ó Tuairisc (1919–1982) – composer of Irish poetry in the Irish language; born at Ballinasloe, County Galway, but lived his later years at Carlow with his second wife.

== Twin towns ==
Carlow is twinned with the following places:

- Northwich, in Cheshire, England.
- Dole, Jura, France
- Davenport, Iowa, United States
- Tempe, Arizona, United States.

== See also ==
- List of towns and villages in Ireland
- High Sheriff of Carlow
- Lyster – English occupational surname, mentioned in histories as transplanted to Carlow in Ireland.
