= Irish Destiny =

1926 film

- Poster
- Directed by: George Dewhurst
- Written by: Isaac Eppel
- Starring: Paddy Dunne Cullinan; Frances Macnamarra
- Production company: Eppels Films Ltd.
- Release date: 24 March 1926
- Running time: 73 minutes (5 reels)
- Country: Ireland
- Languages: Silent film English intertitles

Irish Destiny is a 1926 Irish film directed by George Dewhurst and written by Isaac Eppel produced in the Irish Free State period to mark the tenth anniversary of the Easter Rising. A cut version was released in Britain, entitled An Irish Mother.

The film was considered lost for many years until in 1991 a single surviving nitrate print was located by the Irish Film Institute in the United States' Library of Congress. The institute's archive had the film transferred to safety stock and restored. The institute then commissioned Mícheál Ó Súilleabháin to write a new score for the film.

Irish Destiny is the first fiction film that deals with the Irish War of Independence, and the first and only film written and produced by Isaac (Jack) Eppel, a Jewish Dublin GP and pharmacist who also enjoyed a career as theater impresario and cinema owner.

== Cast ==
- Paddy Dunne Cullinan as Denis O'Hara
- Frances Macnamarra as Moira Barry, a schoolteacher and Denis' fiancée
- Daisy Campbell as Mrs. O'Hara, Denis' mother
- Clifford Pembroke as Mr. O'Hara, Denis' father
- Brian Magowan as Gilbert Beecher, a gang leader of the poteen-makers
- Cathal MacGarvey as Shanahan, a jarvey
- Evelyn Henchey as Kitty Shanahan's daughter
- Kit O'Malley as Captain Kelly, commandant, Clonmore Battalion, IRA
- Val Vousden as Priest
- Tom Flood as Intelligence Officer, IRA headquarters
- Derek Eppel as Schoolboy
- Simon Eppel as man with cigar at Vaughan's Hotel
