= Carlow Vocational School =

- Scoil Naomh Odhran
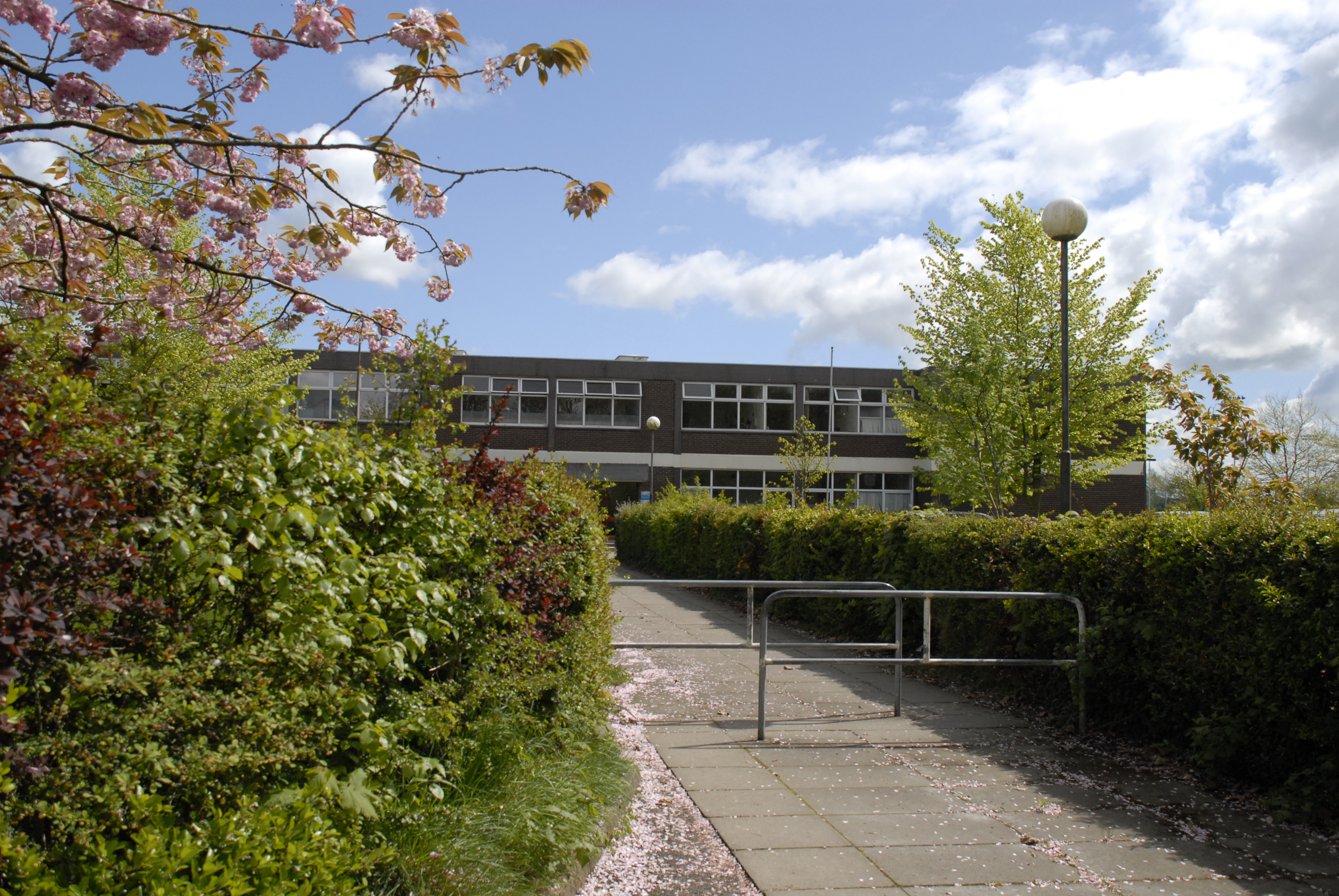

Location
- Carlow; Ireland
- Coordinates: 52.8277°N 6.9358°W

Information
- Staff: 75 full time, 25 part time
- Years offered: 1st-6th
- Gender: co-educational
- Enrollment: 1100
- Colours: blue and yellow

Carlow Vocational School was a second-level educational establishment in Carlow, Ireland. The school closed in May 2017, with students transferring to Tyndall College, Carlow.

== History ==
The school could trace its origins to the nineteenth century when classes commenced at various locations in the town under the Technical Instruction Act 1889 (52 & 53 Vict. c. 76). Some years later, in 1918, the playwright George Bernard Shaw donated the Assembly Rooms to the people of Carlow for the promotion of technical education. Classes were centralised in these Assembly Rooms on Dublin Street from 1923 onwards.

It was formally established under the Vocational Education Act 1930 and continued to be located in the Assembly Rooms. The remodelled and refurbished school premises in Dublin Street was opened on 26 January 1936 by the Minister of Education Mr. Tom Derrig T.D. By the 1960s the school was spread over eight different locations and was providing both a second level educational programme preparing students for the Day Vocational Certificate, the Intermediate Certificate and Leaving Certificate examinations and also education and training for apprentices and technicians.

In 1968, the Department of Education gave sanction for the erection of two purpose built structures on the Kilkenny Road to cater for the expanding vocational school population. One building, opened in 1970, was called Carlow Regional Technical College which later became the Institute of Technology, Carlow. This was assigned for the education and training of apprentices and technicians. In 1972 the second building, designed to accommodate 450 second level students, opened and was called Carlow Vocational School.
