= John Lyons (VC) =

Irish recipient of the Victoria Cross

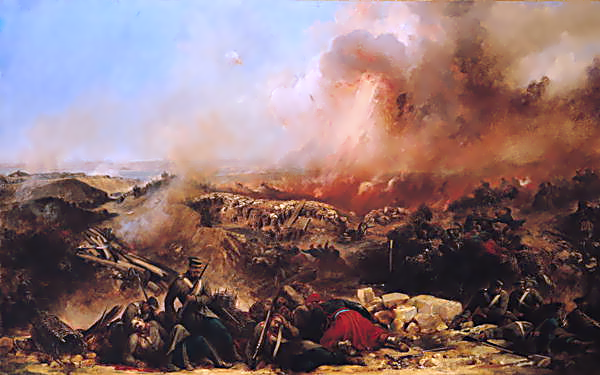
- Depiction of the Siege of Sebastopol
- Born: c. 1824; Carlow, County Carlow
- Died: 20 April 1867 (aged 42–43); Naas, County Kildare
- Military career
- Allegiance: United Kingdom
- Branch: British Army
- Rank: Corporal
- Units: 19th Regiment of Foot
- Conflicts: Crimean War; Indian Mutiny
- Awards: Victoria Cross

John Lyons VC (c. 1824 – 20 April 1867) was born in County Carlow, Ireland and was an Irish recipient of the Victoria Cross, the highest and most prestigious award for gallantry in the face of the enemy that can be awarded to British and Commonwealth forces.

== Career ==
He was approximately 32 years old, and a private in the 19th Regiment of Foot (later The Yorkshire Regiment - Alexandra, Princess of Wales's Own), British Army, during the Crimean War when the following deed took place for which he was awarded the VC.

On 10 June 1855 at Sebastopol, in the Crimean Peninsula, Private Lyons picked up a live shell which had fallen among the guard of the trenches, and threw it over the parapet, thus saving many lives.

== Later life ==
He later served in the Indian Mutiny and achieved the rank of Corporal. He died in Naas, County Kildare on 20 April 1867.

== Awards ==
His Victoria Cross is displayed at the Green Howards Museum (Richmond, Yorkshire, England).
