= John Augustine Sheppard =

Irish-American clergyman

John Augustine Sheppard (September 28, 1849 – 1925) was an Irish-American clergyman. Born in Carlow, Ireland, he was the son of James and Mary (Curran) Sheppard. He was a Monsignor, Vicar general of the Roman Catholic Archdiocese of Newark, and Prothonotary and Domestic Prelate of the Papal Court. He was the first priest in the United States to receive the distinction of Monsignor by Pope Pius X. He was also honored with the designation Prothonotary Apostle.

== Early years ==
He was three years old when his parents brought him to Paterson, New Jersey. He received his primary education in the city's public schools and at St. John's Parochial School. While he studied in St. John's Parish, the Civil War was raging. He was employed for a time as a clerk in a couple of the Paterson stores until he decided to devote himself to the priesthood. At seventeen, he entered St. Charles College, and from there, he became a student in Seton Hall College. In September, 1872, he was enrolled among the first year theologians in the Seminary of the Immaculate Conception at South Orange and graduated from there on June 10, 1876.

== Career ==
Immediately after his ordination, Sheppard became assistant to Monsignor Doane, rector of St. Patrick's Cathedral in Newark; and while serving as curate there, he distinguished himself in church circles by founding and promoting the success of the "Sacred Heart Union," a quarterly established for the purpose of raising funds for the support of the Catholic Protectory. He made many tours to parishes to enlist the sympathy and co-operation of the pastors in behalf of the wayward and homeward boys for whom the Protectory was established, and the receipts from its sales formed a large part of the fund that maintained its establishment.

He was still in that service when John McGranigan, a parishioner who had observed his zeal in church work, bequeathed his house and lot worth about $6,000 and cash to the amount of $14,000 to him. The money was distributed between St. Michael's Hospital, St. Mary's Academy and other religious institutions. The house was turned over to St. Vincent de Paul Society to erect a home for working boys, the foundation of the NewsBoys Lodging House which was merged into the Catholic Protectory. Monsignor Sheppard was afterwards assigned to the parish at Dover, New Jersey but Bishop Winand Wigger, within a year, put him in charge of St. Nicholas' Church in Passaic. The parish was not a promising field at the time; but soon, in place of the dilapidated frame building in which the services had been held, there arose a stone church of Gothic architecture, a commodious brick school, and a stone rectory. His energies spread to the field around him, and St. Mary's Hospital and the Church of Corpus Christi on Hasbrouck Heights are other monuments to his credit. St. Nicholas's Parish which, when he went there, was tottering under a debt of $15,000, had, when he left, property worth above all incumbrances more than $150,000.

The next charge assigned to Father Sheppard was that as rector of St. Michael's Church in Jersey City. There, he was faced by a debt of $127,000 on property in a run-down condition. He put his energy into changing its conditions; and in 1909, County Register James C. Clarke, of Hudson, New Jersey canceled the church mortgage for $100,000 which had been made in 1906 to the Mutual Benefit Life Insurance Company of Newark. In 1902, Sheppard was made Vicar General of the Diocese; and, a year following, he was the first priest in the United States to receive the distinction of Monsignor at the hands of Pope Pius X. The still further mark of distinction, that of Prothonotary Apostle, came to him in 1903. Among the greater achievements of Sheppard's latter years was the formation of the Diocesan Union of Holy Name Societies that were already existing, independently, in the various parishes. Sheppard was also one of the influential members of the Bishops Committee that framed what is known as "The Bishops Law" for the regulation of the liquor traffic in the state of New Jersey with a special view to a better observance of the Sunday law and for the suppression of the back rooms some of the drinking places maintained; and he also originated the movement that resulted in the passage of the act prohibiting Justices of the Peace from performing marriage ceremonies.
