= R726 road (Ireland) =

Road in Ireland

R726 road
- Bóthar R726
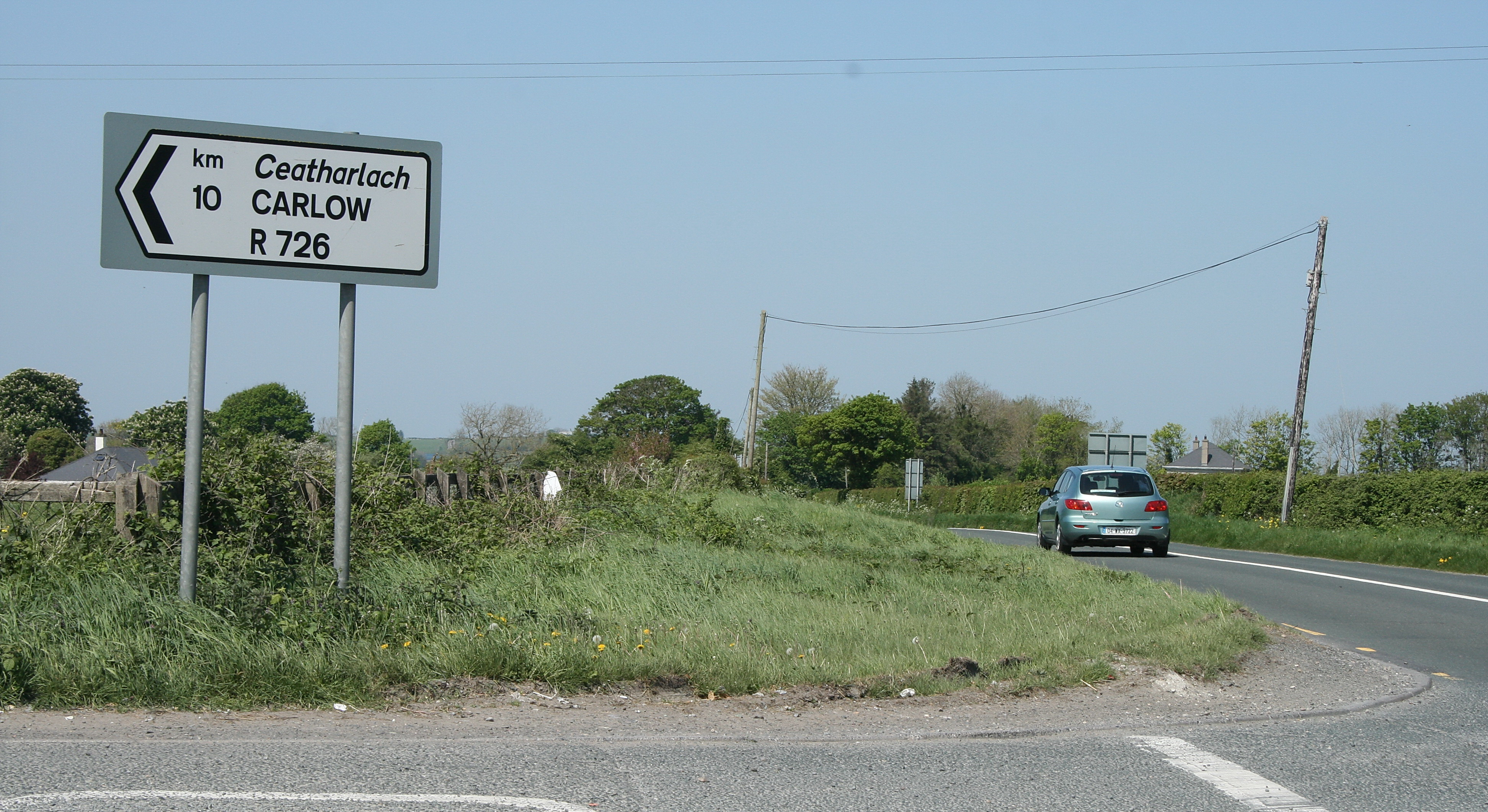
- R726 at Killerrig Cross Roads junction with the R418

Route information
- Length: 19 km (12 mi)

Location
- Country: Ireland
- Primary destinations: County Carlow; Carlow leave R417 in Town Centre; (N80); Brownshill Dolmen; Killerrig Cross Roads – R418; (R727); Ballyhacket Cross Roads; Terminates at the N81 near Rathvilly

Highway system
- Roads in Ireland; Motorways; Primary; Secondary; Regional

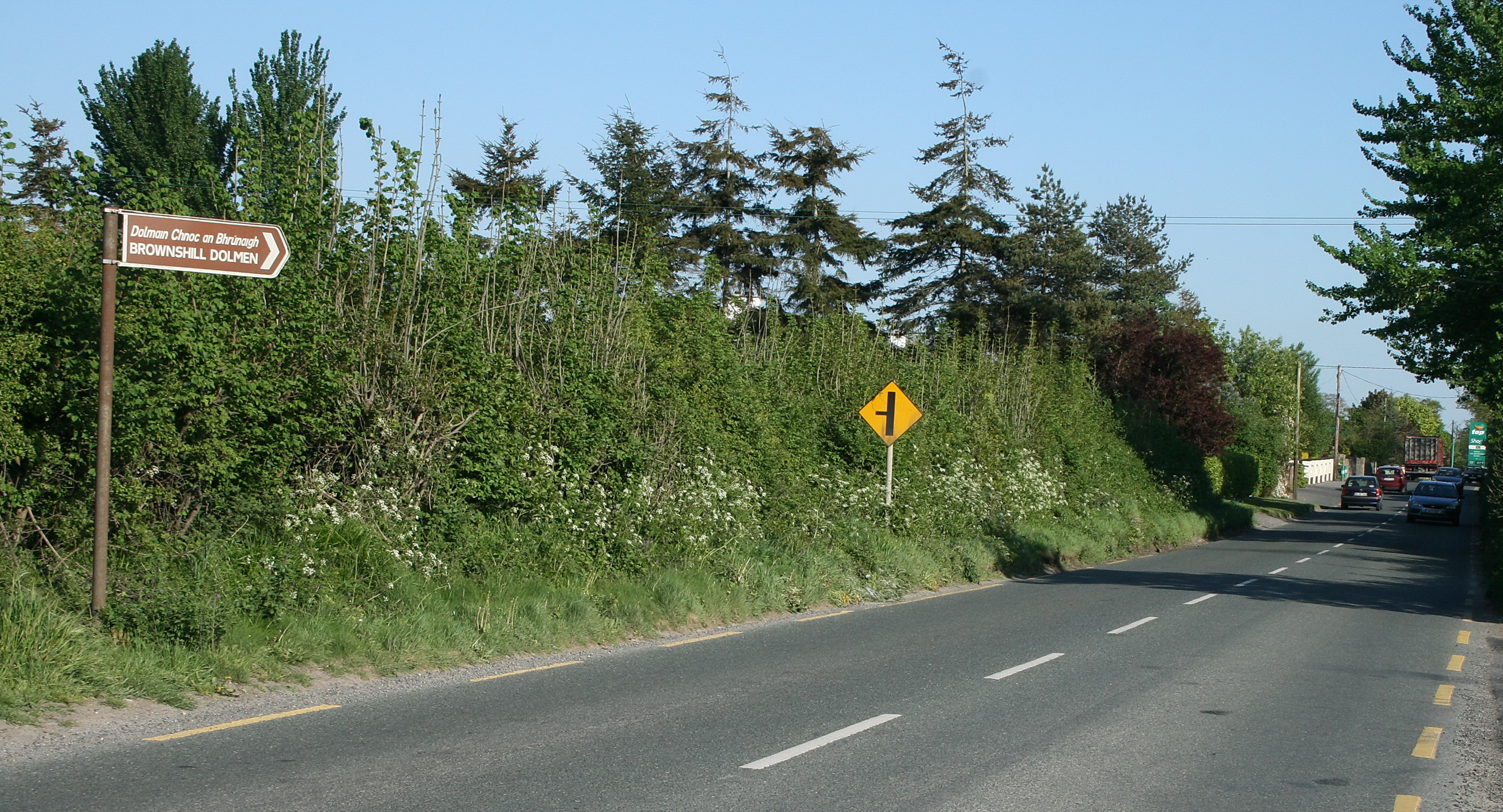
R726 at Brownshill Dolmen

The R726 road is a regional road in Ireland which runs west-east from the R417 in Carlow, County Carlow to the N81 near Rathvilly, County Carlow. The route is 19 km (12 mi) long.

The Brownshill Dolmen is visible from the R726 just outside Carlow Town.

== See also ==
- Roads in Ireland
- National primary road
- National secondary road
