= R727 road (Ireland) =

Road in Ireland

Coordinates: 52.844620°N 6.691373°W

R727 road
- Bóthar R727
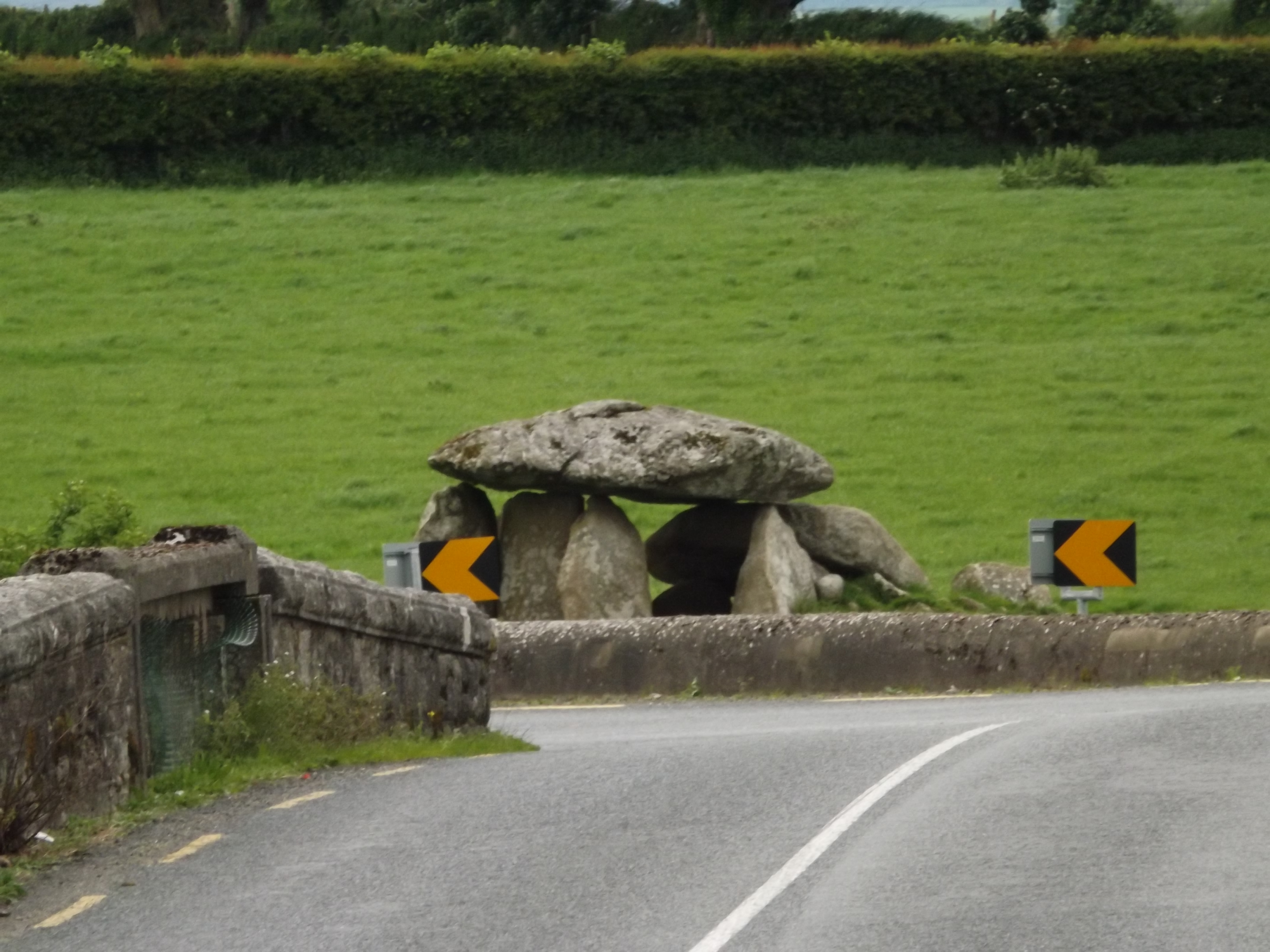
- Haroldstown Dolmen, on the R727

Route information
- Length: 15.2 km (9.4 mi)

Major junctions
- From: R726 Straboe
- Crosses River Slaney (Moatabower Bridge); N81 Kilmagarvoge (McGrath's Crossroads); Crosses River Derreen
- To: R747 Hacketstown

Location
- Country: Ireland

Highway system
- Roads in Ireland; Motorways; Primary; Secondary; Regional

The R727 road is a regional road in Ireland, located in County Carlow, running between the R726 in Straboe and the R747 at Hacketstown.
