= Carlow Town Hall =

Municipal building in Carlow, County Carlow, Ireland

- Halla an Bhaile Ceatharlach
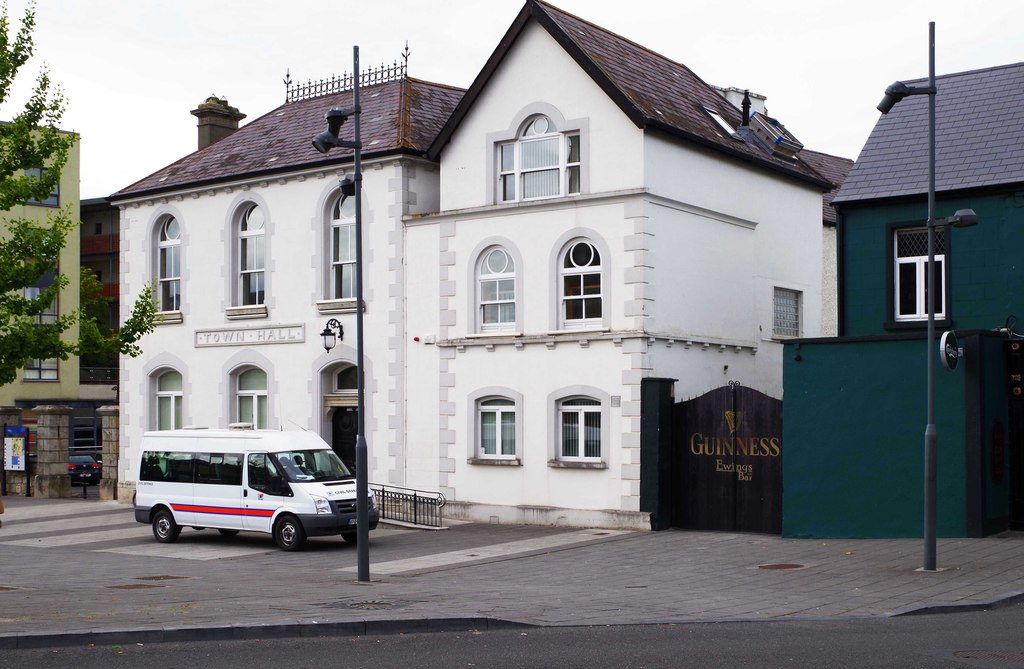
- Carlow Town Hall

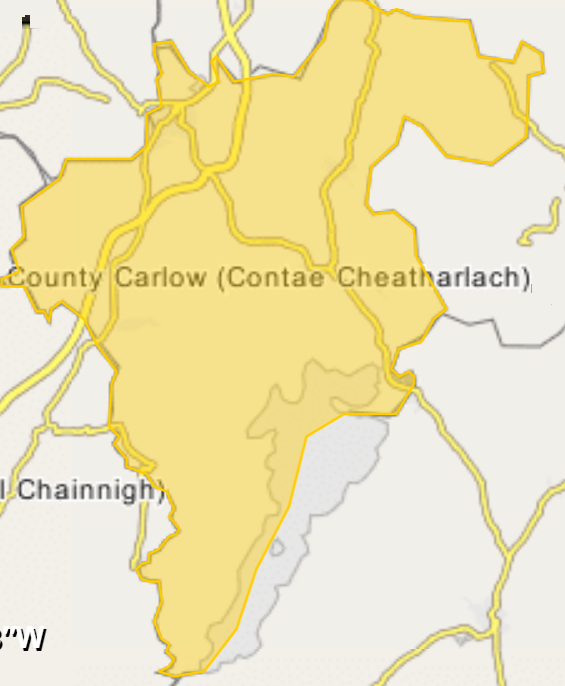
- Location within County Carlow

General information
- Architectural style: Victorian style
- Location: Centaur Street, Carlow, Ireland
- Coordinates: 52.8376°N 6.9331°W
- Completed: 1886

Design and construction
- Architect: William Hague

Carlow Town Hall (Irish: Halla an Bhaile Ceatharlach) is a municipal building in Centaur Street, Carlow, County Carlow, Ireland. The building accommodated the offices of Carlow Town Council until 2014 but is now used as a community events venue.

== History ==
In the early 1880s, the town commissioners decided to commission a town hall for Carlow. The site they selected had been occupied by an old brewery, which was converted into a workhouse by the local board of guardians during the Great Famine. The new building was designed by William Hague in the Victorian style, built by Connolly & Son in brick with a cement render finish at a cost of £3,800 and was officially opened by the chairman of the town commissioners, John Hammond, on 30 March 1886.

The design involved an asymmetrical main frontage of five bays facing onto Centaur Street. The left-hand section of three bays featured a segmental headed doorway with a fanlight in the right hand bay and was fenestrated by segmental headed windows on the ground floor, and by round headed windows on the first floor, with a modillioned cornice, a hipped roof and iron cresting above. The right-hand section of two bays was fenestrated by smaller segmental headed windows on the ground floor, and by smaller round headed windows on the first floor. There was also an attic level, which was slightly recessed and fenestrated by a Venetian window, with a gable above. Internally, the principal rooms were the main assembly hall, which was 71 feet (22 m) long and 30.5 feet (9.3 m) wide, and the board room, which was 36 feet (11 m) long and 19 feet (5.8 m) wide, both on the first floor.

The town hall was used for public events from an early stage and a ball was held in the assembly room, at which guests included Sir Clement James Wolseley, 7th Baronet and Lady Wolseley, whose seat was at Mount Wolseley House near Tullow, on 10 August 1886. An old gas lamp above the doorway became one of the first in the United Kingdom to be converted for electrical use in 1891.

The organist at Carlow Cathedral, Jan Baptist van Craen, gave a public concert in the town hall on 13 February 1893. The building became the offices and meeting place of Carlow Urban District Council when it was formed in 1900. The former Rector of Carlow College, Father Patrick Doyle, gave a lecture of John Mitchel's Jail Journal in 1913, and the Minister for Agriculture, Art O'Connor, convened a conference in the town hall, intending to resolve issues between the Irish Transport and General Workers' Union and the Irish Farmers' Union, on 10 August 1920.

The building continued to be used as the offices of the urban district council until 2002, and then as the offices of the successor town council. An extensive programme of refurbishment works, which included repairs to the old lamp above the doorway, was completed in 2006. The Carlow County Museum which had been based in the town hall since 1979, moved to the former Presentation Convent in College Street in April 2012. The building ceased to be the local seat of government in 2014, when the council was dissolved and administration of the town was amalgamated with Carlow County Council in accordance with the Local Government Reform Act 2014.
