= Hacketstown =

Town in County Carlow, Ireland

Hacketstown Baile Haicéid
- Town
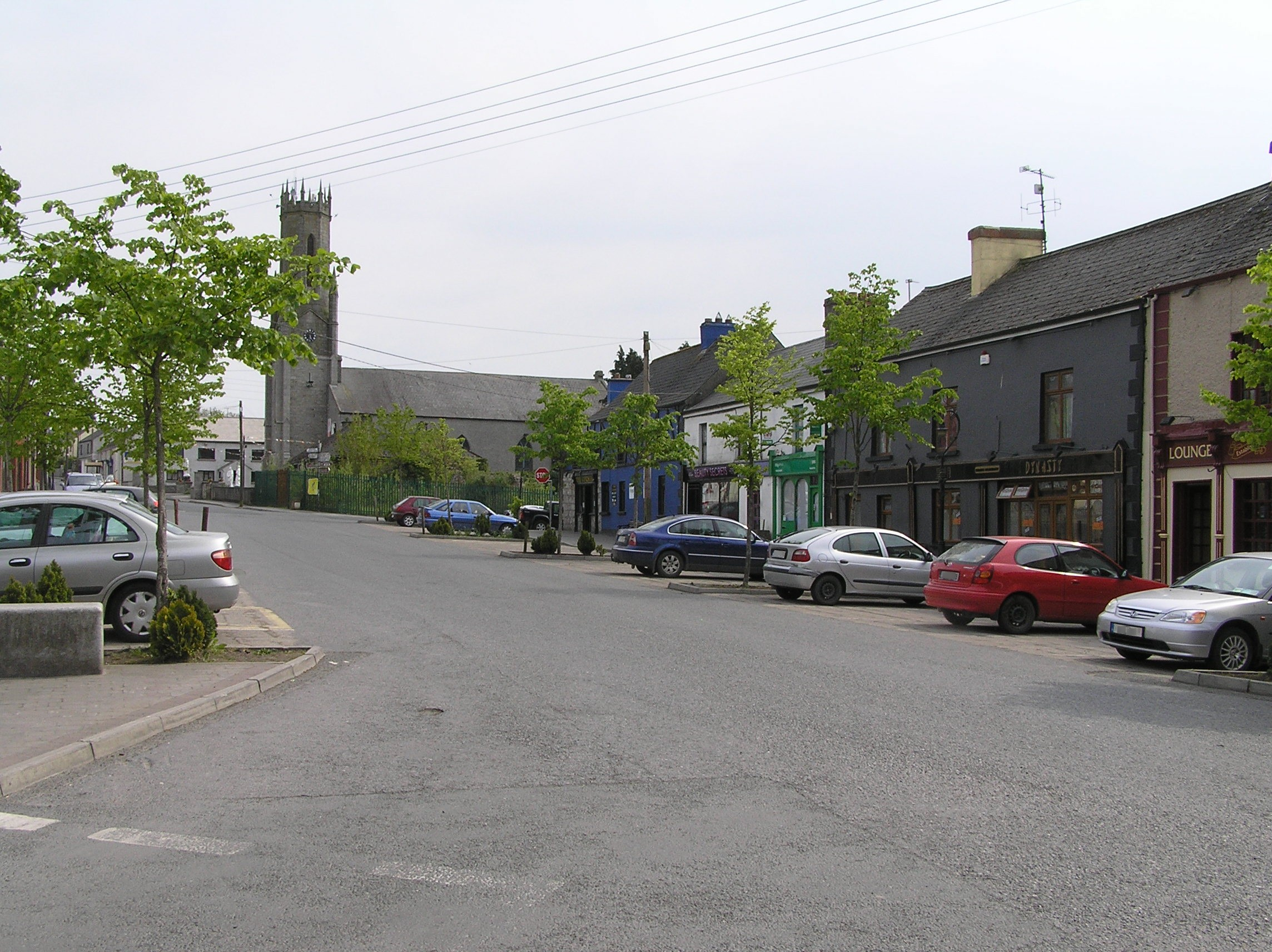
- Main Street

- Location in Ireland
- Coordinates: 52°51′50″N 6°33′25″W
- Country: Ireland
- Province: Leinster
- County: County Carlow
- Elevation: 166 m (545 ft)

Population (2022)
  - Total: 653
- Time zone: UTC+0 (WET)
  - Summer (DST): UTC-1 (IST (WEST))
- Irish Grid Reference: S972801
- Website: www.hacketstown.ie

Hacketstown (Irish: Baile Haicéid, IPA: [ˈbˠalʲə ˈhaceːdʲ]), historically known as Ballydrohid (Irish: Baile an Droichead), is a small town and civil parish in County Carlow, Ireland, near the border with County Wicklow. The civil parish extends into County Wicklow.

It is located on the R747 road at its junction with the R727. The River Derreen flows westwards just north of the town and the River Derry rises just south of the town.

== History ==
In the early thirteenth century, an Anglo-Norman castle was built on the site where St Brigid's Church sits now.

In the seventeenth century the wealthy Chetham family from New Moston, Lancashire, England acquired lands here. Although they lived mainly in England, a Chetham daughter married into the powerful Irish Loftus family.

Hacketstown was the scene of two battles during the 1798 rebellion. On 25 May 1798, there were several skirmishes in the town. Later, on 25 June, several thousand rebels including Michael Dwyer and his followers, tried to capture the military barracks to take the firearms and ammunition. The fighting lasted for the better course of a day. Most of the houses in the village were destroyed and several hundred rebels were killed during the fighting. The military evacuated the barracks and retreated to Tullow, a nearby town.

Hacketstown has a national school and secondary school, Coláiste Eoin. There is a Roman Catholic church, St Bridget's, and a Church of Ireland chapel, St John's.

William Presley, an ancestor of Elvis Presley, was a resident of the town before emigrating to America over 200 years ago.

In 2011, the US town of Hackettstown, New Jersey, declared a sister city relationship with Hacketstown.

== See also ==
- Category:People from Hacketstown
- List of towns and villages in the Republic of Ireland
