= Mary de Lourdes Gogan =

Personal life
- Born: 21 December 1908 Dunshaughlin, County Meath
- Died: 8 May 2000 (aged 91) Áras Mhuire Nursing Home, Drogheda, County Louth

Religious life
- Religion: Roman Catholic
- Order: Medical Missionaries of Mary

Sister Mary de Lourdes Gogan (21 December 1908 – 8 May 2000) was an Irish Medical Missionaries of Mary nun and missionary nurse in Nigeria.

== Early life and education ==
Sister Mary de Lourdes Gogan was born Christina Gogan, also known as Chrissie, in Dunshaughlin, County Meath on 21 December 1908. Her parents were John, licensed vintner and general merchant, and Bridget Gogan (née Caul). She was the second of eight siblings. She attended the local primary school and then the Mercy Convent, Arklow. She then entered the Mater Misericordiae Hospital, Dublin to train as a nurse, being awarded her RGN in 1932.

== Career ==
She was a staff nurse in Pembroke Nursing Home, Dublin until 1936, and was a private nurse until 1940 until she entered the Medical Missionaries of Mary on 11 February 1940, the feast day of Our Lady of Lourdes. Gogan recounted the story that she joined the Medical Missionaries of Mary having met the foundress Mother Mary Martin when she was driving through Dunshaughlin and her car tyre punctured. While that was being fixed, Martin was invited into the Gogan home for a cup of tea. She professed on 8 September 1942, joining the staff of Our Lady of Lourdes Hospital, Drogheda, studying midwifery in 1944.

On 5 April 1945, Gogan along with Sr M. Aloysius Connolly, and Sr M. Philomena Doyle arrived in Ogoja, Nigeria to establish a medical service to eliminate the leprosy that was endemic in the region. Here they worked with Dr Joseph Barnes. She had responsibility for the treatment administration, which was injections of chaulmoogra oil, which was not a cure for the disease but a treatment for some of the symptoms. For her first few days there she taught basic nursing skills to the small group of boys who spoke English and they became her staff. Her fellow sisters were in charge of the practical day-to-day life. By the end of 1945, a routine service was established in the region and wider region. After this the sisters planned to open a similar service at Abakaliki, and a second unit at Obudu, near the Cameroun mountains. Gogan and Sr M. Brigid Kavanagh were assigned to Abakaliki.

In the new region, the local language was Igbo, with a different culture of markets and farming. She was supported by the local missionary priests to introduce her and Sr Kavanagh to the local people. Their leprosy settlement was 4 miles from Abakaliki town with the only transport being by bicycle, despite this the leprosy service was successful. The first resident doctor was Dr Denis Freeman from Dublin. Dapsone tablets, an effective cure for leprosy, became the routine treatment by 1950. More medical services were being established in the diocese, when she returned from her first visit home to Ireland, Gogan was appointed the sister in charge at Ogoja as well as the regional superior at Obudu and the general and maternity hospital at Afikpo. Other sisters who joined the mission in Nigeria included Eileen Morris. In the following years, she was involved in the foundations of a number of general and maternity hospitals at Obudu, Ikom, Nkalagu and nDubia. She had been due to return home to Ireland for leave at the outbreak of the Nigerian civil war on 6 July 1967, but she chose to stay with her sisters until the battle front moved on from Ogoja diocese and the medical services were restored. She continued this work until 1969, when she was not physically fit enough to continue with missionary work.

Gogan returned to Ireland in June 1969, where she became sister superior at Airmount Maternity Hospital, Waterford for five years.

== Death ==
She lived at the Beechgrove convent and then the Áras Mhuire Nursing Home, Drogheda for her final 6 years, where she died on 8 May 2000. She is buried in Drogheda.
