= Joseph Barnes (Irish doctor) =

Irish physician in West Africa

- Born: 14 November 1914; Belfast, Ireland
- Died: 6 May 2017 (aged 102); Dublin, Ireland
- Occupations: Physician, medical missionary

Joseph Barnes (14 November 1914 – 4 May 2017) was an Irish physician and medical missionary who worked in leper colonies in West Africa in the 1940s. There he worked with sisters from the Medical Missionaries of Mary including Sr Mary de Lourdes Gogan. Most notably, he co-founded International Community for the Relief of Suffering and Starvation (ICROSS) with Michael Elmore-Meegan.

Born in Belfast, Barnes was educated at Synge Street CBS and University College, Dublin. He lectured in tropical medicine at the Royal College of Surgeons in Ireland. He became a centenarian in November 2014, and died in 2017, aged 102.
