= Thomas Stock =

Thomas or Tom Stock may refer to:

- Thomas Stock (founder), established the first Sunday school in the United Kingdom
- Thomas Stock (Canadian politician), member of the Ontario Provincial Parliament
- Thomas Stock (MP), Irish Liberal politician
- Tom Stock (swimmer), American backstroke swimmer
- Tom Stock (weightlifter), American weightlifter
