= Eileen Morris =

Irish nun and missionary nurse (1919–1993)

Personal life
- Born: 25 September 1919 Powerstown, Clonmel, County Tipperary, Ireland
- Died: 4 December 1993 (aged 74) Áras Mhuire Nursing Home, Drogheda, County Louth

Religious life
- Religion: Roman Catholic
- Order: Medical Missionaries of Mary

Sister Mary Francis or Eileen Morris (25 September 1919 – 4 December 1993) was an Irish Medical Missionaries of Mary nun and missionary nurse in Nigeria.

== Early life ==
Eileen Morris was born at Powerstown, Clonmel, County Tipperary on 25 September 1919 with her twin sister, Peggy. Her parents were Margaret (née O'Neill) and Thomas A. Morris, merchant. She also had another sister and a brother. Morris attended the local primary school and then Our Lady's Bower, Athlone from 1933 to 1936. She trained in shorthand and typing, and from 1939 to 1943 she worked in the Irish Council of Churches offices. She trained with the Red Cross during the period of World War II, and became interested in becoming a nurse. From 1943 to 1946, she trained as a nurse at St Vincent's Hospital, Dublin. During this time she met a member of the new religious congregation, the Medical Missionaries of Mary.

== Missionary work ==
Morris entered the order as Sister Mary Francis on 15 September 1947 and a professed member of the Medical Missionaries of Mary on 8 September 1950. In November 1950 she travelled to Ogoja diocese, Nigeria. She joined a community of fellow nuns, including Mary de Lourdes Gogan, who had been treating those effected by leprosy in the region. She spent her first 6 months at the general hospital before being appointed to the central leprosy hospital at Ogoja. This hospital treated patients of all ages and stages of disease. She served as matron at a number of hospitals until her retirement in 1979: Ikom (1954 to 1959, 1962 to 1964), Nkalagu (1964 to 1967), and Obudu (1959 to 1962, 1968 to 1979). Despite her retirement from the position of matron, Morris continued her work with leprosy and tuberculosis patients at Obudu.

An encounter with a blind patient in Obudu, who had formerly been a teacher before contracting filaria, inspired Morris to found a school for the blind in the region. The modest school was opened in 1974 with very limited accommodation for those pupils who lived too far away to walk home. The school catered for those with other disabilities, teaching them suitable skills. The Obudu area was visited annually by a Dutch ophthalmologist, who performed sight-restoring surgery and administered other treatments. At the time there was no provision for ophthalmology outside of Lagos. With the support of the German Mission for the Blind Society the school grew and developed, and celebrated its silver jubilee in 1997. Owing to Morris' fundraising, Obudu hospital had a ward for blind patients and a fully equipped theatre.

Due to declining health, Morris retired completely in 1988 and returned to Ireland in 1990. She lived near her family for a time at Rosedale, Kilmacow. She died at the order's nursing home in Drogheda on 4 December 1993.
