= Henry Owen Lewis =

Irish Home Rule politician

Henry Lewis MP

Member of Parliament for Carlow
- In office 31 January 1874 – 31 March 1880
- Preceded by: William Fagan
- Succeeded by: Charles Dawson

Personal details
- Born: Henry Owen Lewis; 26 September 1842
- Died: 5 August 1913 (aged 70)
- Party: Home Rule League
- Spouse: Francis Sophia Elsegood (m. 1866)

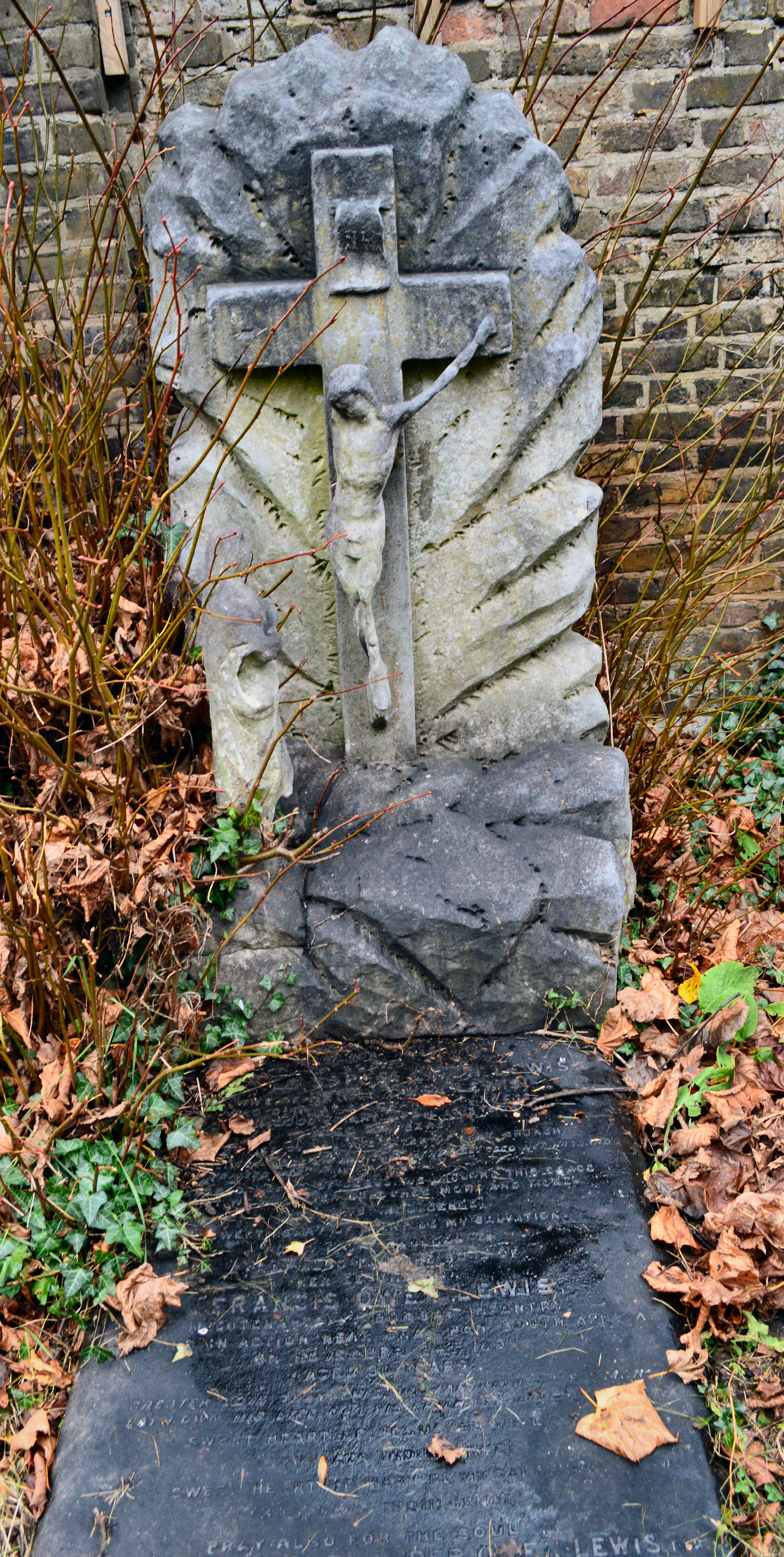
Grave, St Mary Magdalen, Mortlake

Henry Owen Lewis (26 September 1842 - 5 August 1913) was an Irish Home Rule politician. He was MP for Carlow from 1874 to 1880. His daughter Frances (1873–1959) married colonial governor Cornelius Alfred Moloney and in widowhood co-founded the Missionary Sisters of St. Columban.

He was High Sheriff of Monaghan in 1885. He died 4 August 1913 at Manresa House, Roehampton, and was buried at St Mary Magdalen Roman Catholic Church, Mortlake.
