= William Fagan =

William Fagan may refer to:

- Willie Fagan (1917–1992), footballer who played for Liverpool
- William Trant Fagan (1801–1859), Irish writer and Member of Parliament from Cork
- William Fagan (MP) (1832–1890), Member of the UK Parliament for Carlow Borough
- Bill Fagan (1869–1930), baseball player
