= Frances Moloney =

Irish socialite

- Born: Frances Owen-Lewis; 18 April 1873; Marylebone, London, U.K.
- Died: 15 August 1959 (aged 86); Cahiracon, County Clare, Ireland
- Other names: Sister Mary Patrick, Mother Mary Patrick
- Occupations: Socialite, religious sister, Catholic missionary
- Spouse: Cornelius Alfred Moloney
- Father: Henry Owen Lewis

Lady Frances Isabella Sophia Mary Moloney (née Lewis; 18 April 1873 – 15 August 1959) was an Irish socialite who in widowhood co-founded the Missionary Sisters of St. Columban and became a nun, taking the religious name Sister Mary Patrick.

== Early life and education ==
Moloney was born in Marylebone, London, the daughter of Henry Owen Lewis, a Catholic landowner and MP. She attended the Sacred Heart Convent school in Hove. She married Cornelius Alfred Moloney, a colonial governor in the British West Indies. When he retired she worked on the society page of London magazines.

== Religious life and mission work in China ==
After her husband's 1913 death in Italy, Moloney had an audience with the Pope, and contemplated religious life. In 1914 she worked in Dublin with Belgian refugees of World War I. In 1918 Father John Blowick persuaded her to help the priests of the Maynooth Mission to China (later the Missionary Society of St. Columban). In 1922 with Blowick and Mary Martin, she co-founded the Missionary Sisters of St. Columban, a female auxiliary to the priests, with a noviciate in Cahiracon (Cathair Dhá Chon), County Clare.

Moloney trained in midwifery, tropical medicine, and nursing to prepare for her missionary calling. She served in China from 1926 to 1936. She was based in Hanyang and Sientaochen, providing preventive care including vaccinations and public health services during epidemics, and treating survivors after the disastrous 1931 floods along the Yangtze River. Later, she was recalled to Ireland, where she headed promotional work for the order's work in China, as superior general until 1946 and as vicar general until 1952. She was also editor of the congregation's magazine for several years.

== Death and legacy ==
Moloney died in 1959, at the age of 86, at Cahiracon. A biography of Frances Moloney was published in 1999. Her story was recalled when the Missionary Sisters of St. Columban marked their 100th anniversary in 2024.
