= Brownlow Layard =

Member of Parliament for Carlow Borough
- In office 5 July 1841 – 5 August 1847
- Preceded by: Thomas Gisborne
- Succeeded by: John Sadleir

Personal details
- Born: 14 July 1804
- Died: 27 December 1853 (aged 49)
- Party: Whig

Brownlow Villiers Layard (14 July 1804 – 27 December 1853) was an Irish Whig politician.

Layard was elected Whig MP for Carlow Borough at the 1841 general election and held the seat until 1847, when he was defeated.

Parliament of the United Kingdom
Preceded by Thomas Gisborne	Member of Parliament for Carlow Borough; 1841–1847	Succeeded by John Sadleir
