= Solar water disinfection =

Portable water purification powered by sunlight

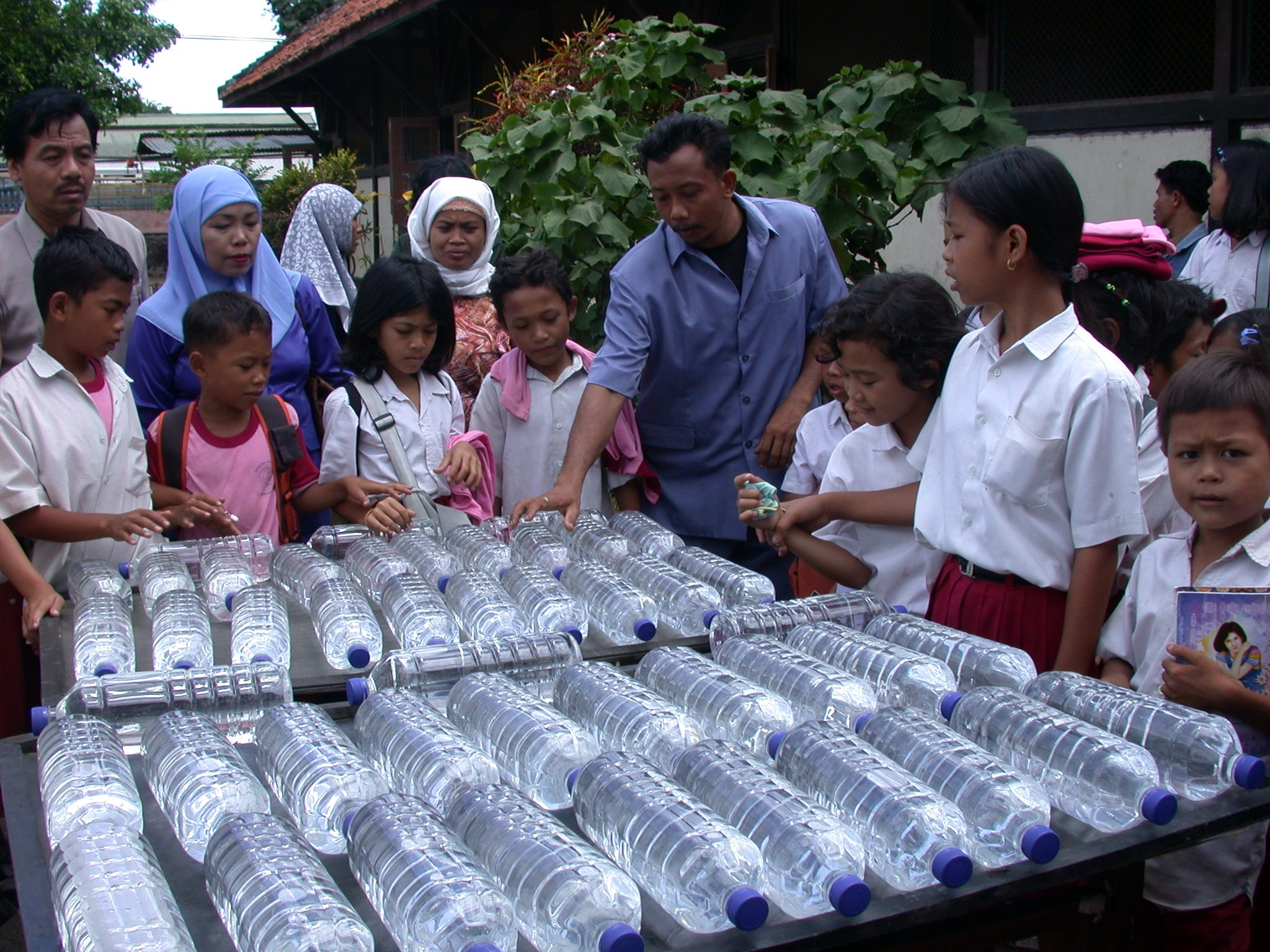
Solar water disinfection (SODIS) application in Indonesia using clear polyethylene terephthalate (PET) plastic beverage bottles

Solar water disinfection, in short SODIS, is a type of portable water purification that uses solar energy to make biologically contaminated (e.g. bacteria, viruses, protozoa and worms) water safe to drink. Water contaminated with non-biological agents such as toxic chemicals or heavy metals require additional steps to make the water safe to drink.

Solar water disinfection is usually accomplished using some mix of electricity generated by photovoltaics panels (solar PV), heat (solar thermal), and solar ultraviolet light collection.

Solar disinfection using the effects of electricity generated by photovoltaics typically uses an electric current to deliver electrolytic processes which disinfect water, for example by generating oxidative free radicals which kill pathogens by damaging their chemical structure. A second approach uses stored solar electricity from a battery, and operates at night or at low light levels to power an ultraviolet lamp to perform secondary solar ultraviolet water disinfection.

Solar thermal water disinfection uses heat from the sun to heat water to 70–100 °C for a short period of time. A number of approaches exist. Solar heat collectors can have lenses in front of them, or use reflectors. They may also use varying levels of insulation or glazing. In addition, some solar thermal water disinfection processes are batch-based, while others (through-flow solar thermal disinfection) operate almost continuously while the sun shines. Water heated to temperatures below 100 °C is generally referred to as pasteurized water.

The ultraviolet part of sunlight can also kill pathogens in water. The SODIS method uses a combination of UV light and increased temperature (solar thermal) for disinfecting water using only sunlight and repurposed PET plastic bottles. SODIS is a free and effective method for decentralized water treatment, usually applied at the household level and is recommended by the World Health Organization as a viable method for household water treatment and safe storage. SODIS is already applied in numerous developing countries. Educational pamphlets on the method are available in many languages, each equivalent to the English-language version.

== Process for household application ==
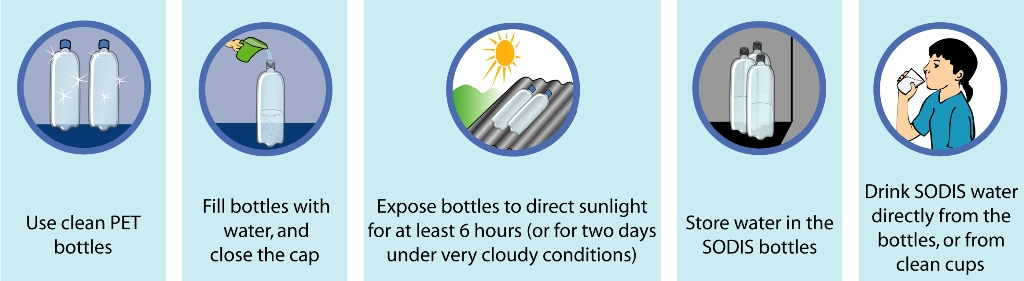
SODIS instructions for using solar water disinfection

Guides for the household use of SODIS describe the process.

Colourless, transparent PET water or soda bottles of 2-litre or smaller size with few surface scratches are selected for use. Glass bottles are also suitable. Any labels are removed and the bottles are washed before the first use. Water from possibly contaminated sources is filled into the bottles, using the clearest water possible. Where the turbidity is higher than 30 NTU it is necessary to filter or precipitate out particulates prior to exposure to the sunlight. Filters are locally made from cloth stretched over inverted bottles with the bottoms cut off. In order to improve oxygen saturation, the guides recommend that bottles be filled three-quarters, shaken for 20 seconds (with the cap on), then filled completely, recapped, and checked for clarity.

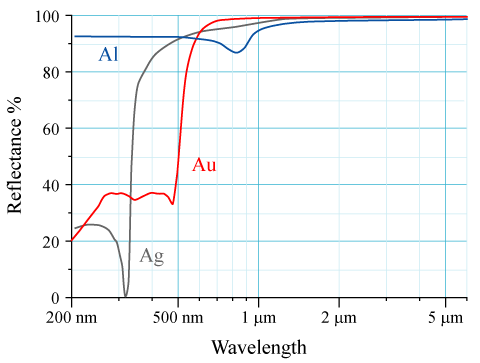
Aluminum reflects ultraviolet well

The filled bottles are then exposed to the fullest sunlight possible. Bottles will heat faster and hotter if they are placed on a sloped sun-facing reflective metal surface. A corrugated metal roof (as compared to a thatched roof) or a slightly curved sheet of aluminum foil increases the light inside the bottle. Overhanging structures or plants that shade the bottles must be avoided, as they reduce both illumination and heating. After sufficient time, the treated water can be consumed directly from the bottle or poured into clean drinking cups. The risk of re-contamination is minimized if the water is stored in the bottles. Refilling and storage in other containers increases the risk of contamination.

Suggested treatment schedule
Weather conditions	Minimum treatment duration
Sunny (less than 50% cloud cover)	6 hours
Cloudy (50–100% cloudy, little to no rain)	2 days
Continuous rainfall	Unsatisfactory performance; use rainwater harvesting

The most favorable regions for application of the SODIS method are located between latitude 15°N and 35°N, and also 15°S and 35°S. These regions have high levels of solar radiation, with limited cloud cover and rainfall, and with over 90% of sunlight reaching the earth's surface as direct radiation. The second most favorable region lies between latitudes 15°N and 15°S. these regions have high levels of scattered radiation, with about 2500 hours of sunshine annually, due to high humidity and frequent cloud cover.

Local education in the use of SODIS is important to avoid confusion between PET and other bottle materials. Applying SODIS without proper assessment (or with false assessment) of existing hygienic practices and diarrhea incidence may not address other routes of infection. Community trainers must themselves be trained first.

== Applications ==
SODIS is an effective method for treating water where fuel or cookers are unavailable or prohibitively expensive. Even where fuel is available, SODIS is a more economical and environmentally friendly option. The application of SODIS is limited if enough bottles are not available, or if the water is highly turbid. In fact, if the water is highly turbid, SODIS cannot be used alone; additional filtering is then necessary.

A basic field test to determine if the water is too turbid for the SODIS method to work properly is the newspaper test. For the newspaper test the user has to place the filled bottle upright on top of a newspaper headline and look down through the bottle opening. If the letters of the headline are readable, the water can be used for the SODIS method. If the letters are not readable then the turbidity of the water likely exceeds 30 NTU, and the water must be pretreated.

In theory, the method could be used in disaster relief or refugee camps. However, supplying bottles may be more difficult than providing equivalent disinfecting tablets containing chlorine, bromine, or iodine. In addition, in some circumstances, it may be difficult to guarantee that the water will be left in the sun for the necessary time.

Other methods for household water treatment and safe storage exist, including chlorination, flocculation/disinfection, and various filtration procedures. The method should be chosen based on the criteria of effectiveness, the co-occurrence of other types of pollution (e.g. turbidity, chemical pollutants), treatment costs, labor input and convenience, and the user's preference.

When the water is highly turbid, SODIS cannot be used alone; additional filtering or flocculation is then necessary to clarify the water prior to SODIS treatment. Recent work has shown that common table salt (NaCl) is an effective flocculation agent for decreasing turbidity for the SODIS method in some types of soil. This method could be used to increase the geographic areas for which the SODIS method could be used as regions with highly turbid water could be treated for low costs.

SODIS may alternatively be implemented using plastic bags. SODIS bags have been found to yield as much as 74% higher treatment efficiencies than SODIS bottles, which may be because the bags are able to reach elevated temperatures that cause accelerated treatment. SODIS bags with a water layer of approximately 1 cm to 6 cm reach higher temperatures more easily than SODIS bottles, and treat Vibrio cholerae more effectively. It is assumed this is because of the improved surface area to volume ratio in SODIS bags. In remote regions plastic bottles are not locally available and need to be shipped in from urban centers which may be expensive and inefficient since bottles cannot be packed very tightly. Bags can be packed more densely than bottles, and can be shipped at lower cost, representing an economically preferable alternative to SODIS bottles in remote communities. The disadvantages of using bags are that they can give the water a plastic smell, they are more difficult to handle when filled with water, and they typically require that the water be transferred to a second container for drinking.

Another important benefit in using the SODIS bottles as opposed to the bags or other methods requiring the water to be transferred to a smaller container for consumption is that the bottles are a point-of-use household water treatment method. Point-of-use means that the water is treated in the same easy to handle container it will be served from, thus decreasing the risk of secondary water contamination.

== Cautions ==
The PET recycling mark shows that a bottle is made from polyethylene terephthalate, making it suitable for solar water disinfection

If the water bottles are not left in the sun for the proper length of time, the water may not be safe to drink and could cause illness. If the sunlight is less strong, due to overcast weather or a less sunny climate, a longer exposure time in the sun is necessary.

The following issues should also be considered:

Bottle material
Some glass or PVC materials may prevent ultraviolet light from reaching the water. Commercially available bottles made of PET are recommended. The handling is much more convenient in the case of PET bottles. Polycarbonate (resin identification code 7) blocks all UVA and UVB rays, and therefore should not be used. Bottles that are clear are to be preferred over bottles that have been colored, for example green lemon/lime soda pop bottles.
Aging of plastic bottles
SODIS efficiency depends on the physical condition of the plastic bottles, with scratches and other signs of wear reducing the efficiency of SODIS. Heavily scratched or old, blind bottles should be replaced.
Shape of containers
The intensity of the UV radiation decreases rapidly with increasing water depth. At a water depth of 10 cm (4 inches) and moderate turbidity of 26 NTU, UV-A radiation is reduced to 50%. PET soft drink bottles are often easily available and thus most practical for the SODIS application.
Oxygen
Sunlight produces highly reactive forms of oxygen (oxygen free radicals and hydrogen peroxides) in the water. These reactive molecules contribute in the destruction process of the microorganisms. Under normal conditions (rivers, creeks, wells, ponds, tap) water contains sufficient oxygen (more than 3 mg/L of oxygen) and does not have to be aerated before the application of SODIS.
Leaching of bottle material
There has been some concern over the question of whether plastic drinking containers can release chemicals or toxic components into water, a process possibly accelerated by heat. The Swiss Federal Laboratories for Materials Testing and Research have examined the diffusion of adipates and phthalates (DEHA and DEHP) from new and reused PET-bottles in the water during solar exposure. The levels of concentrations found in the water after a solar exposure of 17 hours in 60 °C (140 °F) water were far below WHO guidelines for drinking water and in the same magnitude as the concentrations of phthalate and adipate generally found in high-quality tap water. Concerns about the general use of PET-bottles were also expressed after a report published by researchers from the University of Heidelberg on the release of antimony from PET-bottles for soft drinks and mineral water stored over several months in supermarkets. However, the antimony concentrations found in the bottles are orders of magnitude below WHO and national guidelines for antimony concentrations in drinking water. Furthermore, SODIS water is not stored over such extended periods in the bottles.
Regrowth of bacteria
Once removed from sunlight, remaining bacteria may again reproduce in the dark. A 2010 study showed that adding just 10 parts per million of hydrogen peroxide is effective in preventing the regrowth of wild Salmonella.
Toxic chemicals
Solar water disinfection does not remove toxic chemicals that may be present in the water, such as factory waste.

== Health impact, diarrhea reduction ==
According to the World Health Organization, more than two million people per year die of preventable water-borne diseases, and one billion people lack access to a source of improved drinking water.

It has been shown that the SODIS method (and other methods of household water treatment) can very effectively remove pathogenic contamination from the water. However, infectious diseases are also transmitted through other pathways, i.e. due to a general lack of sanitation and hygiene. Studies on the reduction of diarrhea among SODIS users show reduction values of 30–80%.

== Research ==
The effectiveness of the SODIS was first discovered by Aftim Acra, of the American University of Beirut in the early 1980s. Follow-up was conducted by the research groups of Martin Wegelin at the Swiss Federal Institute of Aquatic Science and Technology (EAWAG) and Kevin McGuigan at the Royal College of Surgeons in Ireland. Clinical control trials were pioneered by Ronan Conroy of the RCSI team in collaboration with Michael Elmore-Meegan.

A joint research project on SODIS was implemented by the following institutions:

- Royal College of Surgeons in Ireland (RCSI), Ireland (coordination)
- University of Ulster (UU), United Kingdom
- CSIR Environmentek, South Africa, EAWAG, Switzerland
- The Institute of Water and Sanitation Development (IWSD), Zimbabwe
- Plataforma Solar de Almería (CIEMAT-PSA), Spain
- University of Leicester (UL), United Kingdom
- The International Commission for the Relief of Suffering and Starvation (ICROSS), Kenya
- University of Santiago de Compostela (USC), Spain
- Swiss Federal Institute of Aquatic Science and Technology (Eawag), Switzerland

The project embarked on a multi-country study including study areas in Zimbabwe, South Africa and Kenya.

Other developments include a continuous flow disinfection unit and solar disinfection with titanium dioxide film over glass cylinders, which prevents the bacterial regrowth of coliforms after SODIS.

Research has shown that a number of low-cost additives are capable of accelerating SODIS and that additives might make SODIS more rapid and effective in both sunny and cloudy weather, developments that could help make the technology more effective and acceptable to users. A 2008 study showed that powdered seeds of five natural legumes (peas, beans and lentils)—Vigna unguiculata (cowpea), Phaseolus mungo (black lentil), Glycine max (soybean), Pisum sativum (green pea), and Arachis hypogaea (peanut)—when evaluated as natural flocculants for the removal of turbidity, were as effective as commercial alum and even superior for clarification in that the optimum dosage was low (1 g/L), flocculation was rapid (7–25 minutes, depending on the seed used) and the water hardness and pH was essentially unaltered. Later studies have used chestnuts, oak acorns, and Moringa oleifera (drumstick tree) for the same purpose.

Other research has examined the use of doped semiconductors to increase the production of oxygen radicals under solar UV-A. Recently, researchers at the National Centre for Sensor Research and the Biomedical Diagnostics Institute at Dublin City University have developed an inexpensive printable UV dosimeter for SODIS applications that can be read using a mobile phone. The camera of the phone is used to acquire an image of the sensor and custom software running on the phone analyses the sensor colour to provide a quantitative measurement of UV dose.

In isolated regions the effect of wood smoke increases lung disease, due to the constant need for building fires to boil water and cook. Research groups have found that boiling of water is neglected due to the difficulty of gathering wood, which is scarce in many areas. When presented with basic household water treatment options, residents in isolated regions in Africa have shown a preference for the SODIS method over boiling or other basic water treatment methods.

A very simple solar water purifier for rural households has been developed which uses 4 layers of saree cloth and solar tubular collectors to remove all coliforms.

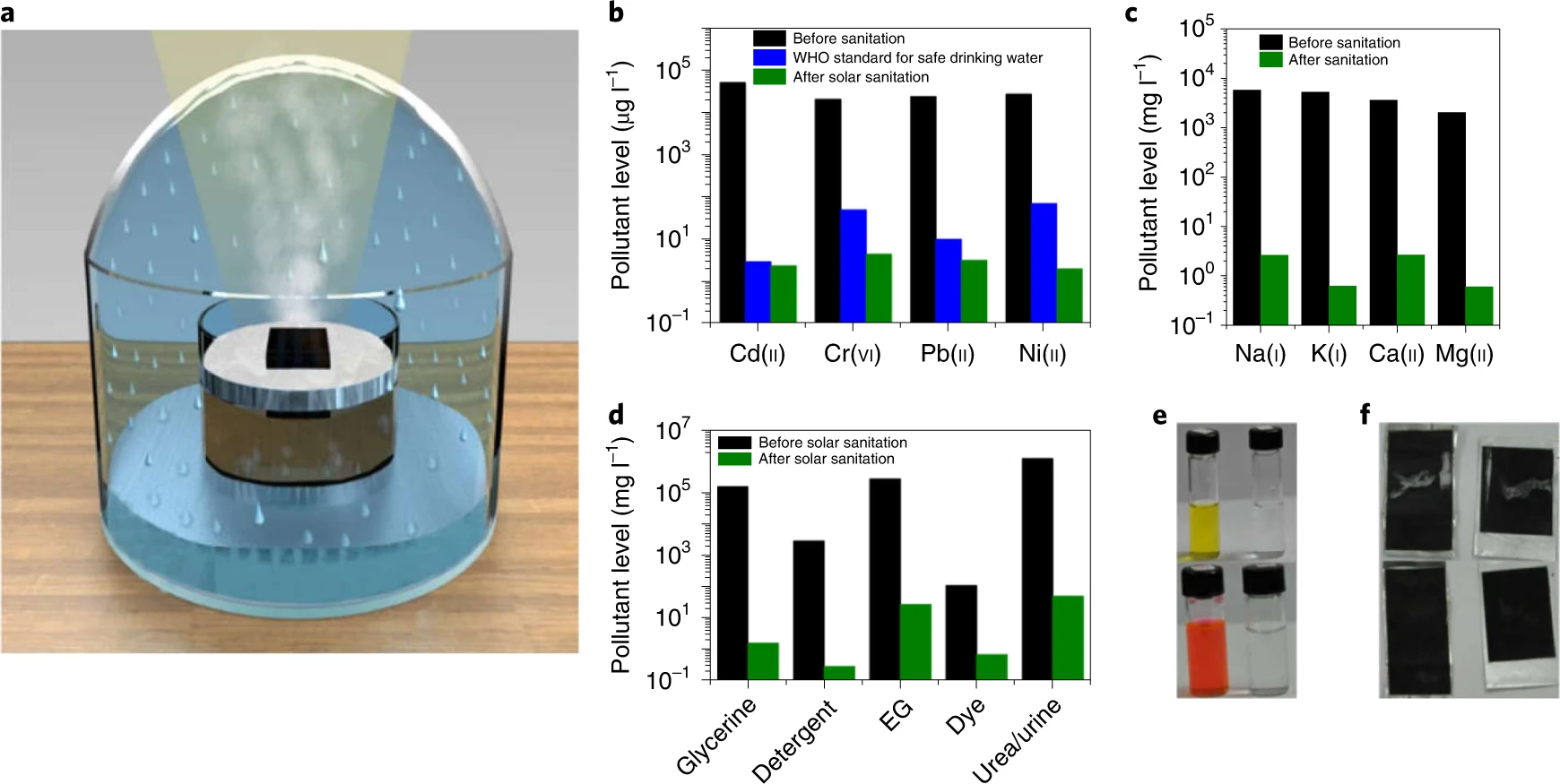

In July 2020 researchers reported the development of a reusable aluminium surface for efficient solar-based water sanitation to below the WHO and EPA standards for drinkable water.

== Promotion ==
The Swiss Federal Institute of Aquatic Science and Technology (EAWAG), through the Department of Water and Sanitation in Developing Countries (Sandec), coordinates SODIS promotion projects in 33 countries including Bhutan, Bolivia, Burkina Faso, Cambodia, Cameroon, DR Congo, Ecuador, El Salvador, Ethiopia, Ghana, Guatemala, Guinea, Honduras, India, Indonesia, Kenya, Laos, Malawi, Mozambique, Nepal, Nicaragua, Pakistan, Perú, Philippines, Senegal, Sierra Leone, Sri Lanka, Togo, Uganda, Uzbekistan, Vietnam, Zambia, and Zimbabwe.

SODIS projects are funded by, among others, the SOLAQUA Foundation, several Lions Clubs, Rotary Clubs, Migros, and the Michel Comte Water Foundation.

SODIS has also been applied in several communities in Brazil, one of them being Prainha do Canto Verde, Beberibe west of Fortaleza. Villagers there using the SODIS method have been quite successful, since the temperature during the day can go beyond 40 °C (104 °F) and there is a limited amount of shade.

One of the most important things to consider for public health workers reaching out to communities in need of suitable, cost efficient, and sustainable water treatment methods is teaching the importance of water quality in the context of health promotion and disease prevention while educating about the methods themselves. Although skepticism has posed a challenge in some communities to adopt SODIS and other household water treatment methods for daily use, disseminating knowledge on the important health benefits associated with these methods will likely increase adoption rates.

== See also ==
- Appropriate technology
- Ultraviolet germicidal irradiation
- Water Pasteurization Indicator
