= Cornelius Alfred Moloney =

British colonial administrator (1848-1913)

Sir Cornelius Alfred Moloney KCMG (1848 – 13 August 1913) was a British colonial administrator.

He served as British Administrator of The Gambia from 1884 to 1886, Governor of Lagos Colony from 1886 to 1890, Governor of British Honduras from 1891 to 1897, Governor of the Federal Colony of the Windward Islands from 1897 to 1900, and Governor of Trinidad and Tobago from November 1900 to 1904. It was during his term as governor of Trinidad and Tobago that the 1903 Water Riots took place. The riot resulted in the destruction of the Red House, the seat of government.

Moloney was made a Companion of the Order of St. Michael and St. George (C.M.G.) the 1882 Birthday Honours, later being promoted to Knight Commander (K.C.M.G.) in the 1890 New Year Honours.

Moloney was concerned that the economic value of products of colonies in general, and of those administered by him in his diplomatic roles in particular, should be better propagated, and he believed that this would encourage the economy and provide instruction to the natives. To this end he established an exemplary botanical garden, in 1883, at Kokoinaiko (possibly Okokomaiko), Lagos colony, for the growth of plants of marketable value, including rubber, kola, cotton, shea butter, gum, indigo cacao and others. In his words, "I thought to conduct this operation in such a manner as to encourage economy, replenishing, and the diffusion of useful and botanical knowledge of commercial importance". The garden fell into neglect after he was posted to the British Honduras.

Mimetillus moloneyi (Moloney's mimic bat) was named after him.

After the death of his first wife, he married on 2 March 1897 Frances Isabella Sophia Mary Lewis (1873–1959), daughter of Irish MP Henry Owen Lewis. They moved to Italy in 1911 when his health declined, and he died in Fiesole. His widow returned to Ireland, co-founded the Missionary Sisters of St. Columban, and became a nun.

== Publications ==
- "West African Fisheries, with Particular Reference to the Gold Coast Colony", Sir Cornelius Alfred Moloney, 1883, W. Clowes.
- "Sketch of the Forestry of West Africa with Particular Reference to Its Present Principal Commercial Products", Sir Cornelius Alfred Moloney, 1887, S. Low, Marston, Searle, & Rivington.
- "From a Silver to a Gold Standard in British Honduras", an article from The North American Review, Volume 163. 1896.
- "Preferential Tariff within the British Empire" is an article from The North American Review, Volume 187. 1908.

Government offices
Preceded by Valerius Skipton Gouldsbury	Administrator of The Gambia; 1884–1886	Succeeded by James Shaw Hay
Preceded by	Governor of Lagos; 1886–1890	Succeeded by Gilbert Thomas Carter
Preceded by Roger Tuckfield Goldsworthy	Governor of British Honduras; 1891–1897	Succeeded by David Wilson
Preceded by Sir Charles Bruce	Governor of the Windward Islands; 1897-1900	Succeeded by Sir Robert Baxter Llewelyn
Preceded by Hubert Edward Henry Jerningham	Governor of Trinidad and Tobago; 1900–1904	Succeeded by Henry Moore Jackson
