= Mary Anne Fitzgerald =

British journalist, aid worker, and author

- Born: 29 January 1954 (age 72); South Africa
- Citizenship: South Africa
- Occupation: Journalist
- Employer(s): Financial Times The Sunday Times, newspapers, UNICEF, NGO Refugees International, Financial Times, The Independent, The New York Times, The International Herald Tribune
- Known for: NGO ICROSS, SAIDIA, My Warrior Son, journeys from Samburu, Nomad, Thhrowing The Stick Forward, A very African journey
- Children: 2

Mary Anne Fitzgerald is a British journalist, development aid worker and author, best known for her international war reporting in Africa, and two successful books.

== Biography ==
Fitzgerald was born in South Africa. Some of her life is reported in Nomad (1992), an autobiographical account of her first period of residence and deportation from Kenya, where she had lived for 22 years and raised a family. In Nairobi she had two daughters and adopted a Samburu son, gained a divorce, and became a well-known journalist writing on African affairs, working for the Financial Times, The Sunday Times and other newspapers. She initially reported on economics, but became increasingly involved in political journalism and exposing corruption and human rights abuses. She also helped to establish a health clinic in a disused government building in Lesirikan, Samburu District, in northern Kenya. During this time she encountered the well known explorer Wilfred Thesiger, who was based near Maralal, but initially receiving a frosty reception. The clinic later became the highly successful NGO ICROSS, and she established SAIDIA after being removed from ICROSS, which has attracted worldwide acclaim for its health programs.

Fitzgerald attracted the ire of Daniel arap Moi's government in the 1980s. She was briefly imprisoned in 1987, in squalid conditions, for a minor foreign currency infraction. It is believed the charge was prosecuted because she had recently reported for The Sunday Times on illegal exports by two powerful Indian business partners directly connected with President Moi, (K. Somaia and N.Merali, exporting Kenyan coffee through the black market). Her court conviction was later exploited by the government to challenge her credibility as a journalist. In 1988, she published an article in The Sunday Times documenting how the Kenyan judiciary was directly manipulated by the government to curb political opposition, and how this had led to widespread and well documented human rights abuses. Returning at the end of 1988 to Nairobi on a flight from London she was stalked by the secret police and then deported. Without a home or money, and homesick for Kenya, she eventually settled in London with her daughters. They shared a flat with Kathy Eldon, former Kenya resident and mother of photojournalist Dan Eldon.

After working as a roving journalist (below), she next returned to Kenya for Dan Eldon's funeral in July 1993, by which time she was again allowed to enter the country. The Epilogue to Nomad (1994 version) said she planned to remain in London. Yet in 1997 she worked for UNICEF in New York, and a 2001 article in The New York Times stated that she had returned to Kenya after that, where she spent several years as Africa Representative for the NGO Refugees International. She also published another book on her adoption of a Maasai boy (My Warrior Son, 1998). Her change in direction from journalism to humanitarian relief work resulted in several strong press releases, reports and articles on the refugee crisis in Kenya and neighbouring countries (listed below). In 2000, she visited Eritrea forRefugees International to assess the forced recruitment of child soldiers, just when fighting broke out with Ethiopia – women, children and the elderly fled aerial and artillery attacks. In 2002, she published a book on the plight of women in Southern Sudan and the refugees from that region living in camps in Kenya. She is still on the Boards of SAIDIA and ACE Kenya.

== Journalism ==
As an established journalist and fluent in Swahili and French, after her deportation in 1988 Fitzgerald was able to secure press assignments elsewhere in Africa with a number of newspapers. Already familiar with Ethiopia, she reported in January 1990 from the war zones in the north where the Tigray resistance was gradually breaking the brutal regime of Mengistu Haile Mariam, and she narrowly escaped bombs launched by the government's MiG fighters. Another assignment took her to Bangui in the Central African Republic to report on new game conservation initiatives and killings of poachers. She was then posted to Liberia to cover the First Liberian Civil War in 1990. She was one of the last journalists remaining in Monrovia before the final attacks and mass killings, witnessing atrocities as Charles Taylor and Prince Johnson approached the city and President Samuel Doe's armed forces tried to eliminate opposition by wiping out opposing clans. Scarred by this experience, she later travelled widely, and reported from parts of the francophone Sahel, Ivory Coast and Senegal, and again in Ethiopia. She also worked for the Financial Times, The Independent, The New York Times and The International Herald Tribune. In her work for Refugees International, she travelled widely from 1998 to 2000 and issued press releases to raise awareness of the crises affecting refugees in Eritrea, Ethiopia, Kenya, Somalia, Angola and Southern Sudan.

== Books ==
- Goodfield, June; Fitzgerald, Mary Anne, eds. (1991). Peace in Our Time?. London: Collins & Brown. ISBN 978-1-85585-091-0. A book to support the campaign of the International Committee of The Red Cross and Red Crescent to mobilise worldwide public opinion on the plight of war victims.
- Nomad: journeys from Samburu. London: Sinclair-Stevenson. 1992. ISBN 978-0-670-84846-1. Reprinted by Viking and Penguin in 1993 and Picador in 1994. The 1994 version was more evocatively titled Nomad: one woman's journey into the heart of Africa.
- My warrior son. Michael Joseph. 1998. ISBN 9780718139490. The story of Fitzgerald's struggle to bring up an adopted Samburu boy, before she was expelled from Kenya.
- Throwing the Stick Forward: The Impact of War on Southern Sudanese Women. UNIFEM & UNICEF. 2002. ISBN 978-9966-950-24-6. Contains detailed accounts of the abductions, rape, displacements and fear of women affected by the civil war in Sudan. Sponsored by Operation Lifeline Sudan.
- A very African journey: 50 years of the African Medical and Research Foundation (PDF). Nairobi: AMREF. 2007. Archived from the original (PDF) on 9 March 2012.

== Articles and reports ==
- Fitzgerald, Mary Anne. 1998.Angola : reconciliation is the only solution. Refugees International 15 December.
- Fitzgerald, Mary Anne. 1998. Helping the other 'Somalia' – In the north, Somaliland is forging an independent path to recovery. Christian Science Monitor 28 December.
- Fitzgerald, Mary Anne and Shep Lowman. 1999. Gender violence and kidnapping of women and children at Kakuma Refugee Camp. Refugees 2(115).
- Fitzgerald, Mary Anne. 1999. We keep silent until we die. Refugees 2(115)
- Fitzgerald, Mary Anne and Shep Lowman 1998. Protect refugee women as they gather firewood. The International Herald Tribune, 27 August 1998.
- Fitzgerald, Mary Anne. 1998. Firewood, violence against women and hard choices in Kenya. Refugees International, August 1998.
- Fitzgerald, Mary Anne. 2000. Safe haven for women opened at Kakuma Refugee Camp. 26 April 2000. Refugees International
- Fitzgerald, Mary Anne. 2000. Dying To Be Safe: Get the Minors Out of Kakuma. Refugees International
- Fitzgerald, Mary Anne. 2002. African Medical and Research Foundation Annual Report, 2002. Nairobi: AMREF
- Fitzgerald, Mary Anne. 2003. African Medical and Research Foundation Annual Report, 2003. Nairobi: AMREF
