= John Alexander (MP) =

Irish politician

Member of Parliament for Carlow
- In office 20 January 1853 – 6 May 1859
- Preceded by: John Sadleir
- Succeeded by: John Dalberg-Acton

Personal details
- Born: 26 July 1802
- Died: October 1885 (aged 83)
- Party: Conservative

John Alexander (26 July 1802 – October 1885) was an Irish Conservative politician.

Alexander was the son of his namesake, John Alexander, and Christian née Izod. In 1848, he married Esther Brinkley, daughter of Matthew Brinkley; the couple had six children: John Alexander (born 1850); William Cranstoun Alexander (born 1851); Lorenzo Alexander (1853–1942); Charles Henry Alexander (born 1856); George Alexander (1858–1930); and Harriet Lucia Alexander.

After holding the office of High Sheriff of Carlow in 1824, Alexander was elected as the Conservative Member of Parliament (MP) for Carlow at a by-election in 1853, defeating John Sadleir who had been required to stand in a by-election after he was appointed a Lord Commissioner of the Treasury. He held the seat until his defeat at the 1859 general election.

Parliament of the United Kingdom
Preceded by John Sadleir	Member of Parliament for Carlow; 1853–1859	Succeeded by John Dalberg-Acton
