= Carlow (UK Parliament constituency) =

UK parliamentary constituency in Ireland, 1801–1885

- Former borough constituency for the House of Commons
- County: County Carlow; Queen's County
- Borough: Carlow

1801–1885
- Seats: 1
- Created from: Carlow
- Replaced by: County Carlow; Queen's County Leix

Carlow was a parliamentary constituency in Ireland, represented in the House of Commons of the United Kingdom by one Member of Parliament (MP) from 1801 to 1885.

== History and boundaries ==
This constituency was the parliamentary borough of Carlow on the border of County Carlow and Queen's County. Prior to 1801, Carlow was a two-seat borough constituency in the Irish House of Commons. Under the Acts of Union 1800, which united the Kingdom of Ireland with the Kingdom of Great Britain to form the United Kingdom of Great Britain and Ireland, it was one of 33 boroughs to retain representation, but was reduced to one MP. Its first MP in 1801 was chosen by lot.

Following a report of boundary commissioners, the parliamentary borough was defined by the Parliamentary Boundaries (Ireland) Act 1832 as:

"From the Point below the Town at which the River Barrow is met by the Southern Wall of the Grounds of the House belonging to Mr. Carey, Adjutant to the Carlow Militia, Eastward, along the said Wall to the Point at which the same meets the Kilkenny Road; thence in a straight Line to the Southern Corner of the Infirmary; thence in a straight Line to the Point a little above the Barracks at which the River Burren is joined by a small Stream; thence up the said Stream, and across the Tullow Road, to the Point at which the same Stream is met by a Hedge which runs down thereto from opposite the Southern End of the Plantation attached to the House on the Baltinglass Road which belongs to Mr. Hunt and is occupied by Mr. Butler; thence along the said Hedge to the Point at which the same meets the Baltinglass Road; thence in a straight Line in the Direction of the Cupola of the Lunatic Asylum to the Point at which such straight Line cuts a Road which runs between the Baltinglass Road and the Dublin Road; thence in a straight Line to a Gate on the Eastern Side of the Dublin Road which is distant about One hundred Yards to the North of the North-eastern Corner of the Enclosure Wall of the Lunatic Asylum; thence in a straight Line to the Point at which the Road to Athy is met by the North Boundary of the Demesne of the Roman Catholic Bishop; thence along the said Boundary till it meets the River at the Point; thence along the River to the North Corner of the Wall of the Burial Ground; thence in a straight Line to the Spire of Graigue Church; thence in a straight Line to the Summer House in Mr. Wilson's Garden; thence in a straight Line to the Point first described."

It was disfranchised by the Redistribution of Seats Act 1885, becoming part of the constituencies of County Carlow and Queen's County Leix.

== Members of Parliament ==
Notable MPs for Carlow included F. J. Robinson, later Prime Minister of the United Kingdom as Viscount Goderich, the zoologist Nicholas Aylward Vigors, and the historian and writer John Dalberg-Acton, later known as Lord Acton.

Election	Member	Party	Note
1801	Hon. Henry Prittie		Succeeded as the 2nd Baron Dunalley
1801 b	Hon. Francis Aldborough Prittie		Resigned (appointed Escheator of Munster)
1801 b	Charles Ormsby	Tory	Appointed Recorder of Prince of Wales Island
1806	Michael Symes		
1806	Hon. F. J. Robinson	Pittite	
1807	Andrew Strahan	Tory	
1812	Frederick Falkiner		
1818	Charles Harvey-Saville-Onley	Tory	
1826	Charles Bury	Tory	
1830	Charles Bury	Tory	
1831	Charles Bury	Tory	
1832	Nicholas Aylward Vigors	Repeal	
1835	Francis Bruen	Conservative	
1837	William Henry Maule	Whig	Appointed a Baron of the English Court of Exchequer
1839 b	Francis Bruen	Conservative	Unseated on petition
1839	Thomas Gisborne	Whig	Seated on petition
1841	Brownlow Layard	Whig	
1847	John Sadleir	Whig	
1852	John Sadleir	Independent Irish	Accepted an office. Defeated for re-election as a Liberal.
1853 b	John Alexander	Conservative	
1859	Sir John Dalberg-Acton, Bt	Liberal	
1865	Thomas Stock	Liberal	
1868	William Fagan	Liberal	
1874	Henry Owen Lewis	Home Rule	
1880	Charles Dawson	Home Rule	Member of the Parnellite faction
1885		Divided between County Carlow and Queen's County Leix	

== Elections ==
=== Elections in the 1830s ===
General election 1830: Carlow
Party	Candidate	Votes	%
Tory	Charles Bury	Unopposed	
Registered electors		13	
Tory hold			

General election 1831: Carlow
Party	Candidate	Votes	%
Tory	Charles Bury	Unopposed	
Registered electors		13	
Tory hold			

General election 1832: Carlow
Party	Candidate	Votes	%
Repeal	Nicholas Aylward Vigors	145	54.7
Tory	Francis Bruen	120	45.3
Majority		25	9.4
Turnout		265	95.3
Registered electors		278	
Repeal gain from Tory			

1835 general election: Carlow
Party	Candidate	Votes	%	±%
Conservative	Francis Bruen	150	52.8	+7.5
Repeal (Whig)	Nicholas Aylward Vigors	134	47.2	−7.5
Majority		16	5.6	N/A
Turnout		284	92.5	−2.8
Registered electors		307		
Conservative gain from Repeal		Swing	+7.5	

General election 1837: Carlow
Party	Candidate	Votes	%	±%
Whig	William Henry Maule	180	52.9	+5.7
Conservative	Francis Bruen	158	46.5	−6.3
Ind. Conservative	Philip Bagenal	2	0.6	New
Majority		22	6.4	N/A
Turnout		340	61.3	−31.2
Registered electors		555		
Whig gain from Conservative		Swing	+6.0	

Maule was appointed as Baron of the Exchequer in England, requiring a by-election.

By-election, 27 February 1839: Carlow
Party	Candidate	Votes	%	±%
Conservative	Francis Bruen	167	50.5	+4.0
Whig	Thomas Gisborne	164	49.5	−3.4
Majority		3	1.0	N/A
Turnout		331	c. 59.6	c. −1.7
Registered electors		c. 555		
Conservative gain from Whig		Swing	+3.7	

After meeting 59 times, an election committee amended the poll to 160 for Gisborne and 159 for Bruen and, in July 1839, Gisborne was declared elected.

=== Elections in the 1840s ===
General election 1841: Carlow
Party	Candidate	Votes	%	±%
Whig	Brownlow Layard	Unopposed		
Registered electors		417		
Whig hold				

General election 1847: Carlow
Party	Candidate	Votes	%	±%
Whig	John Sadleir	164	61.9	N/A
Whig	Brownlow Layard	101	38.1	N/A
Majority		63	23.8	N/A
Turnout		265	40.9	N/A
Registered electors		648		
Whig hold		Swing	N/A	

=== Elections in the 1850s ===
General election 1852: Carlow
Party	Candidate	Votes	%	±%
Independent Irish	John Sadleir	112	54.1	−7.8
Conservative	Robert Clayton Browne	95	45.9	New
Majority		17	8.2	−15.6
Turnout		207	87.3	+46.4
Registered electors		237		
Independent Irish gain from Whig		Swing	N/A	

Sadleir was appointed a Lord Commissioner of the Treasury, requiring a by-election.

By-election, 20 January 1853: Carlow
Party	Candidate	Votes	%	±%
Conservative	John Alexander	97	51.6	+5.7
Whig	John Sadleir	91	48.4	−5.7
Majority		6	3.2	N/A
Turnout		188	90.4	+3.1
Registered electors		208		
Conservative gain from Independent Irish		Swing	+5.7	

General election 1857: Carlow
Party	Candidate	Votes	%	±%
Conservative	John Alexander	127	61.7	+15.8
Whig	Arthur Edward Valette Ponsonby	79	38.3	N/A
Majority		48	23.4	N/A
Turnout		206	85.8	−1.5
Registered electors		240		
Conservative gain from Independent Irish		Swing	+15.8	

General election 1859: Carlow
Party	Candidate	Votes	%	±%
Liberal	John Dalberg-Acton	117	53.2	+14.9
Conservative	John Alexander	103	46.8	−14.9
Majority		14	6.4	N/A
Turnout		220	93.2	+7.4
Registered electors		236		
Liberal gain from Conservative		Swing	+14.9	

=== Elections in the 1860s ===
General election 1865: Carlow
Party	Candidate	Votes	%	±%
Liberal	Thomas Stock	126	54.1	+0.9
Conservative	Horace Rochfort	107	45.9	−0.9
Majority		19	8.2	+1.8
Turnout		233	91.4	−1.8
Registered electors		255		
Liberal hold		Swing	+0.9	

General election 1868: Carlow
Party	Candidate	Votes	%	±%
Liberal	William Fagan	174	53.7	−0.4
Conservative	Horace Rochfort	150	46.3	+0.4
Majority		24	7.4	−0.8
Turnout		324	92.0	+0.6
Registered electors		352		
Liberal hold		Swing	−0.4	

=== Elections in the 1870s ===
General election 1874: Carlow
Party	Candidate	Votes	%	±%
Home Rule	Henry Owen Lewis	Unopposed		
Registered electors		303		
Home Rule gain from Liberal				

=== Elections in the 1880s ===
General election 1880: Carlow
Party	Candidate	Votes	%	±%
Parnellite Home Rule League	Charles Dawson	149	52.5	N/A
Conservative	Henry Thomas Butler	135	47.5	New
Majority		14	5.0	N/A
Turnout		284	94.0	N/A
Registered electors		302		
Home Rule hold		Swing	N/A	
