= Tom Stock (weightlifter) =

American weightlifter

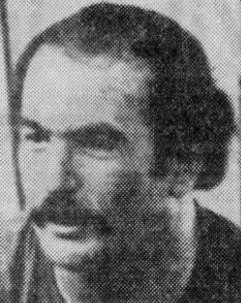
- Stock in 1981

Personal information
- Born: 1951 or 1952 (age 73–74)

Sport
- Country: United States
- Sport: Weightlifting
- Coached by: Ted Frank

Achievements and titles
- Personal bests: Snatch: 335 kg (1978); Clean and jerk: 420 kg (1978); Total: 755 kg (1978)
Medal record
Representing United States
Weightlifting
Pan American Games
Gold medal – first place	1979 San Juan	+110 kg

Tom Stock (born 1951/1952) is an American weightlifter. He competed at the 1979 Pan American Games, winning the gold medal in the +110 kg event.
