= William Fagan (MP) =

Irish politician

William Fagan MP

Member of Parliament for Carlow
- In office 20 November 1868 – 3 February 1874
- Preceded by: Thomas Stock
- Succeeded by: Henry Owen Lewis

Personal details
- Born: 15 December 1832
- Died: 14 March 1890 (aged 57)
- Party: Liberal
- Spouse: Frances Mahony (m. 1871)
- Parent(s): William Trant Fagan; Mary Addis

William Addis Fagan (15 December 1832 – 14 March 1890) was an Irish Liberal politician.

He was elected as the Member of Parliament (MP) for Carlow at the 1868 general election but stood down at the next general election, in 1874.

At some point, Fagan was also Captain of the 12th Royal Lancers.

== Family ==
Fagan was the son of Cork City MP William Trant Fagan. In 1832, he married Frances Mahony, daughter of Daniel Mahony, and together they had two children: Maureen Elizabeth Fagan (born 1875), and William Charles Trant Fagan (born 1877).

Parliament of the United Kingdom
Preceded by Thomas Stock	Member of Parliament for Carlow; 1868 – 1874	Succeeded by Henry Owen Lewis
