= Missionary Sisters of St. Columban =

Irish religious institution

- Formation: 4 October 1922; 103 years ago
- Founders: Sr. Frances Moloney
- Leader: Sr. Anne Carbon, S.S.C.
- Patron saint: Saint Columban
- Website: www.columbansisters.org

The Missionary Sisters of St. Columban (commonly referred to as the Columban Sisters, abbreviated as S.S.C.) are a religious institute of religious sisters dedicated to serve the poor and needy in the underdeveloped nations of the world. They were founded in Ireland in 1924 to share in the work of the priests of the Missionary Society of St. Columban.

== Foundation ==
The origins of the Columban Sisters lay in the work of the Reverend Edward J. Galvin, a priest from County Cork, Ireland. Long desiring to serve in the Chinese missions, he finally was able to go there in 1916 to serve in the missions. He was quickly overwhelmed by the needs of the Chinese people, both materially and spiritually. By 1918, he had founded the Columban Fathers, who quickly developed to the point where they could establish their own mission in China within two years.

Seeing the need for the help of women in the work, especially to care for women and children, one of the founders, John Blowick, recruited several women for this endeavour. Among them was Lady Frances Moloney, a widow, Mary Martin, who had gained nursing experience on the battle lines of Somme, and Agnes Ryan, a schoolteacher. The latter two had joined the new endeavour through their mutual spiritual director, the Reverend Thomas Ronayne. The women then began medical training in England under individual programs to prepare for service in China.

Just as Martin was about to take a course in obstetrics, she was called home to care for her ailing mother. While back in her hometown, Ronayne introduced her to a newly named bishop for Africa, who was also recruiting women to serve in his territory. Martin decided to sign up for this effort instead of China. She was joined in this by Ryan. Moloney continued with the training and became the founder of the Columban Sisters. Martin went to Africa, where she founded the Medical Missionaries of Mary in 1937.

A novitiate for the new congregation was opened on 1 February 1922 for the candidates in Cahiracon, County Clare. That first class numbered nine women, and included Moloney (now known as Sister Mary Patrick) as well as a candidate from Australia. Upon completion of the novitiate in 1924, Moloney was professed and the new congregation of the Missionary Sisters of St. Columban was canonically established, with Mother Mary Patrick being appointed as the Superior General. By September 1926 the congregation had developed to the point where a community of six Sisters could be sent to China, departing from the port of Cobh. They travelled to the Hanyang District of China, which had been entrusted to the Columban Fathers by the Holy See, and began their work in collaboration with the Fathers in that region.

== Mission to China ==
The Sisters continued their work in China for three decades, during an era of massive social instability in that nation. They arrived in the middle of the civil war between the Nationalist Army and the Chinese Communist Party. Relief ships were looted regularly and famine and disease was widespread. They worked to the point of exhaustion nursing the victims of a disastrous flood of the Yangtze River in 1934. The invasion of China by Japan in 1937 had them nursing both civilians and soldiers from a massive outbreak of cholera. The outbreak of World War II forced the Sisters from the Allied nations either to leave the country or face house arrest.

With the victory of the Communist forces in 1949, all institutions of the Columban missionaries were seized by the government, and by 1952, all the Columban Sisters, as well as the Fathers, had been expelled from the country.

== New missions ==
Today the Columban Sisters continue to serve globally. They continue to work in medical care, but have expanded their work to provide pastoral care, education and the promotion of social issues in the countries where they serve.

== Notable Members ==
- Mother Mary Patrick(Frances Moloney), founder
- Sr. Catherine Lillis, missionary, counsellor and founder of the addiction rehabilitation centre,Tabor House.
