= John Sadleir =

Irish financier and politician

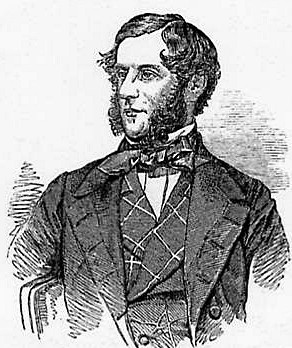
John Sadleir in about 1856

John Sadleir (1813 – 17 February 1856) was an Irish financier and politician, who became notorious as a political turncoat, and committed suicide after the failure of his financial speculations. He served as the model for several fictional portrayals of speculators who come to ruin.

== Biography ==
He was the third son of Clement William Sadleir, a tenant farmer of Shrone Hill, County Tipperary, and his wife, a daughter of James Scully, who founded a private bank in Tipperary town. He was educated at Clongowes College. He qualified as a solicitor, and took over a lucrative practice in Dublin from his uncle. About 1846 he abandoned the law to enter politics, and to join his brother James and their cousin, the younger James Scully, in a disastrous banking venture, the Tipperary Joint Stock Bank.

He entered the House of Commons of the United Kingdom of Great Britain and Ireland in 1847 as a Member of Parliament for Carlow. Sadleir co-founded the Catholic Defence Association in 1851 and was one of the leading figures in the Independent Irish Party which held the balance of power in the House of Commons when it formed in 1852.

He went on to hold minor office in Lord Aberdeen's coalition government from 1852 through 1854: since he had been elected on an explicit pledge not to take office, his decision caused outrage in Ireland, and he was never forgiven for what was seen as a shameless betrayal of his principles. He resigned his ministerial position in 1854 when he was found guilty of being implicated in a plot to imprison a depositor of the Tipperary Bank because the individual in question had refused to vote for him.

By February 1856 the Tipperary Bank was insolvent, owing to Sadleir's overdraft of £288,000. His own financial affairs were ruinous, and in his efforts to solve his problems he milked the London Bank, ruined a small Newcastle upon Tyne bank, sold forged shares of the Swedish Railway Company, raised money on forged deeds, and spent rents of properties he held in receivership and money entrusted to him as a solicitor. In this way, he disposed of more than £1.5 million, mainly in disastrous speculations. Unable to face the consequences, he committed suicide near Jack Straw's Tavern on Hampstead Heath on 17 February 1856 by drinking prussic acid. The Times reported that "[t]he body of Mr J. Sadleir M.P. was found on Sunday morning, February 17 on Hampstead Heath, at a considerable distance from the public road. A large bottle labelled "Oil of Bitter Almonds" and a jug also containing the poison (prussic acid) lay by his side." The body was identified by Edwin James QC MP and Thomas Wakley MP, editor of The Lancet. His brother James Sadleir, also an MP, was found to be deeply implicated in the fraud, having conspired with his younger brother. He was expelled from the House of Commons on 16 February 1857. He fled to the Continent, settling in Zurich and then Geneva. He was murdered there in 1881 while being robbed of his gold watch.

John Sadleir was buried in an unmarked grave in Highgate Cemetery.

== Legacy ==
Charles Dickens based the character of the great financier Mr. Merdle (who goes bankrupt and commits suicide) in Little Dorrit (1857) on John Sadleir. The central character of Anthony Trollope's The Way We Live Now (1875), Melmotte (also a swindling financier who goes bankrupt and commits suicide) may have been based on Sadleir, as well. W. S. Gilbert based part of his 1869 play An Old Score on the story of Sadleir's suicide. The 1885 novel (and later play and silent film) John Needham's Double by Joseph Hatton is also based on Sadleir.

Because the Independent Irish Party were pledged not to take office, the decision of Sadleir and his friend and colleague William Keogh to do so was considered by the Irish public to be an unforgivable betrayal. To "be another Sadleir or Keogh" entered the Irish political vocabulary as being synonymous with being a political turncoat: the phrase was still in use in Ireland as late as the 1950s.

Parliament of the United Kingdom
| Preceded by Brownlow Villiers Layard | Member of Parliament for Carlow; 1847–1853 | Succeeded by John Alexander |
| Preceded by Charles Towneley | Member of Parliament for Sligo; 1853–1856 | Succeeded by John Wynne |
Political offices
| Preceded by Marquess of Chandos; The Lord Henry Lennox; Thomas Bateson | Junior Lord of the Treasury; 1853–1854 | Succeeded by Chichester Fortescue |
