= Michael Elmore-Meegan =

British-born Irish humanitarian

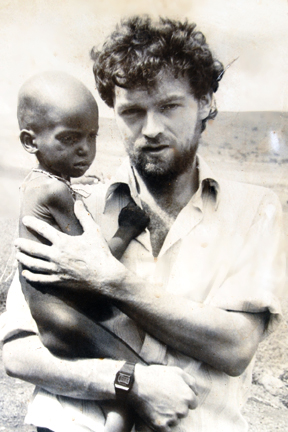
Michael Elmore-Meegan holding a child

Thomas Michael Kevin Elmore-Meegan (born 26 March 1959, in Liverpool), also known as Michael Meegan or Mike Meegan, is a British-born Irish humanitarian and the founder of several charities and non-governmental organisations, specialising in anti-hunger and community health care programmes. His brother, Simon Elmore, is a Munich-based musician.

Elmore-Meegan co-founded the International Community for Relief of Starvation and Suffering (ICROSS), an International aid agency operating in East Africa that describes itself as "a small international organisation working to fight poverty and disease in the poorest parts of the world.

ICROSS Ireland closed in 2012, causing ICROSS International, based in Kenya, to extend its own programmes.

== Background ==
Born in Liverpool of Irish and French parentage, Elmore-Meegan was baptised by John Carmel Heenan (later John Cardinal Heenan). He spent his childhood between Grenoble in the French Alps, Freshfield, Lancashire, and at Rishworth, Yorkshire. He was influenced by the Mill Hill Missionaries in Freshfield. He spoke French and Latin by the age of ten.

In 1971, he moved to Dublin, attending Terenure College, Dublin, run by the Order of the Brothers of Our Lady of Mount Carmel (the Carmelites), where he graduated in 1977. He entered the Roman Catholic Society of White Fathers -- the Missionaries of Africa/Les Pères Blanc -- hoping to become a missionary. Due to a serious burn injury and keloid damage he left the White Fathers, instead completing a degree in Philosophy at the Jesuit Milltown Institute of Theology and Philosophy (awarded by the Holy See), following which he entered the Jesuit novitiate. Later, in 1989, he took an MSc in Community Health from Trinity College Dublin.

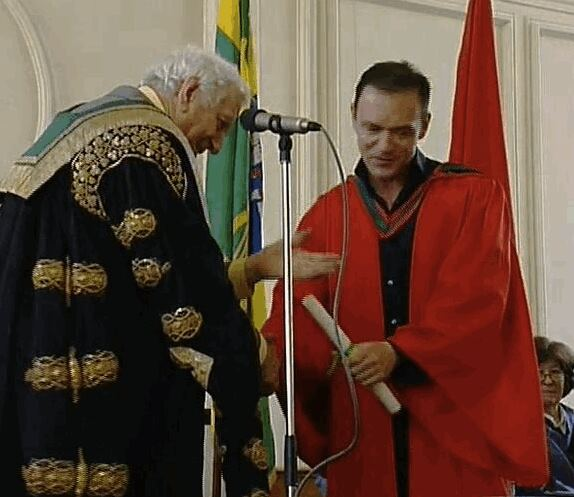
Michael Elmore-Meegan receiving an honorary doctorate in Ireland

After Ecclesiastical training earning an Honours degree in Philosophy from the Holy See, Elmore-Meegan moved to Kenya at aged 20, where he settled in the Northern territories of the Great Rift Valley and began to perform development aid work among the local people. This was largely funded by his own inheritance and by close personal friends. In 1978 his early drafts of spiritual axioms, All Shall be Well, later to be a series of reflections on poverty was published by Collins in 1986 (Fount Religious paperbacks). He began sculpting at an early age, mostly working in clay and bronze. He still does private commissions in bronze.

Since 1980, he suffered a series of serious illnesses in Africa, ranging from cerebral malaria and amoebic and bacillic dystentry to cholera. In 1992, and again in 1999 and 2019, he received the Catholic last rites on three occasions. He handed over his position in ICROSS during his illness in 2019. He never married, being a Catholic Celibate adhering to the divine Office, and in the mid-1980s he adopted two Kenyans; a Samburu, Lemoite Lemako and a Maasai, Saruni OleKoitee OleLengeny, later to become assistant CEO of ICROSS Kenya, a role he held until July 2014.

== Career ==
Elmore-Meegan's first involvement in Africa was in Karamoja, Uganda and then with a number of health and development projects with Dr Robbie McCabe MD in Turkana. He then expended his work into sections of northern Mogadishu in Somalia, developing and interest in infant health and nutrition. He began to work among the Samburu and Maasai people to address villages devastated by diseases such as malaria and tuberculosis and the effects of repeated drought. He spent the 1980s mostly living amongst pastoral nomadic Turkana, Maasai and Samburu tribesmen in Uganda and Northern Kenya. A long-time friend of Wilfred Thesiger, he worked closely with traditional Samburu primarily north of Maralal.

In 1979, Elmore-Meegan, with Dr Joseph Barnes, founded the Community for the Relief of Starvation and Suffering (CROSS) which, by 1984, he renamed the International Community for Relief of Starvation and Suffering (ICROSS), which began funding health projects in Africa and India. He was supported in this work by Dr Wilfred Koinange, Director of Medical Services of the Kenyan Ministry of Health. Together with Fr Paul Cunningham CSSp, Fr Brendan O'Brien CSSp, and Dr Evan Sequeira, he established a series of community health programmes. After 32 years Dr Sequeira retired from the Board of Directors and was replaced by Dr Allan Soita.

By 1985 he had built health clinics and development programmes serving three pastoralist communities. Learning local tribal languages, Elmore-Meegan created a unique approach to community development, insisting that any planning had to be done by the members of the local communities in the local languages, not by others. He pioneered a series of grassroots locally appropriate health interventions as part of integrated community health strategies in close collaboration with leading research institutions including the Institute of Child Health, London. He developed a series of locally appropriate methods for reducing infectious diseases which have been widely adopted. In 1984, he established a branch of his charity in the USA. ICROSS East End expanded with the support of Norman Jaffe and Dr Kenneth Cairns MD, in Suffolk County, New York. ICROSS in Tanzania was established and quickly became self-supporting.

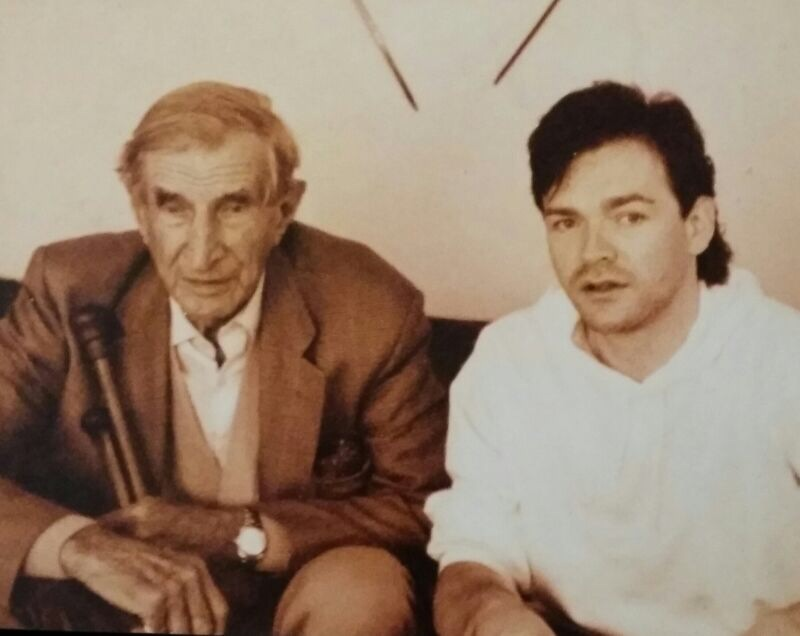
Sir Wilfred Thesiger (left) seated beside Michael Elmore-Meegan

His work extended into reproductive health and eventually HIV/AIDS programmes.

Under Elmore-Meegan's leadership, ICROSS worked with a number of other organisations on a Royal College of Surgeons in Ireland led project, to develop a Solar water disinfection system that could be used by village households.

By the early 2000s, Elmore-Meegan had become a prominent, if sometimes controversial, figure in Ireland whose fundraising activities for ICROSS attracted the public support of former Irish Taoiseach (Prime Minister) Garret FitzGerald and entertainment celebrities, including Elton John, Chris de Burgh, Caroline Corr, and Andrea Corr.

His writing and charitable activity brought him Ireland's well-regarded 2003 International Person of the Year Award presented in a nationally televised ceremony by the Irish charity Rehab.

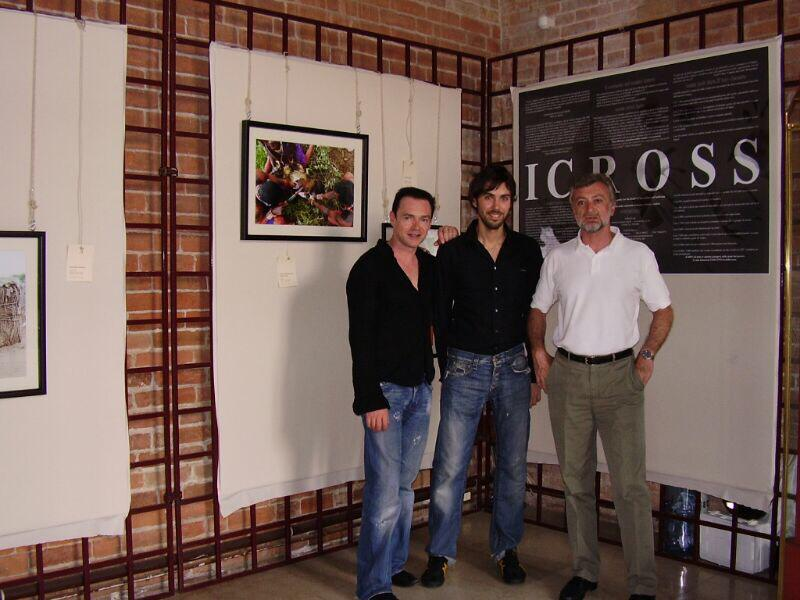
Michael Elmore-Meegan and Manuel Scrima

There has been much media coverage of Elmore-Meegan. In May 2005, Ireland's RTÉ televised a documentary, When You Say 4000 Goodbyes. After the broadcast, Elmore-Meegan's charity ICROSS received some 400,000 euros in donations.

On 19 November 2005, When You Say 4000 Goodbyes was shown at Harvard University's prestigious Magners Irish Film Festival.

On 5 May 2006, the documentary won the Radharc Award 2006 for the "documentary programme of outstanding quality which addresses a national or international topic of social justice, morality or faith."

Elmore-Meegan worked with photographer and video maker Manuel Scrima on several projects and exhibited across Europe sharing Africa Awakes for ICROSS. The awareness advocacy exhibitions have been seen in 12 countries, Italy, Spain, Finland, Ireland, UK, Germany, Hungary, and France, as well as Kenya, Tanzania, Uganda, and South Africa.

== Controversies ==
ICROSS has attracted controversy, in part because of concerns raised by Elmore-Meegan about the distribution of funds raised in Western countries in recent years by charities founded by him. The Irish branch of the organisation has been wound up as a result of his concerns. His qualifications have been questioned and those complaints disproved.

Elmore-Meegan litigated successfully against The Irish Daily Mail in 2010. The apology, read before the High Court Judge and Jury, stated ""The newspaper ought not to have published these allegations and had agreed not to do so. We apologise without reservation to Mr Meegan for the damage and distress caused to him as a result." He later won a civil suit and received a settlement for damages and costs.

In November 2014, Elmore-Meegan launched further defamation actions resulting from other publications in Ireland in the same year, which were successfully settled out of court. In July 2015, the Irish Examiner paid further settlement to avoid pending litigation. In July 2006, it was reported that Elmore-Meegan had misrepresented his credentials in a funding proposal when Duke University (USA) was attempting to secure a multimillion-dollar grant in the United States.

== Awards ==
- 2008 Premio internazionale Exposcuola 2008 per l'impegno civile
- 2008 Angelo della Pace
- 2006 Fellow, Royal Academy of Medicine in Ireland
- 2006 Graves Medal Dublin
- 2006 Honorary Doctor of Medicine (DMed), National University of Ireland
- 2003 International Person of the Year, ESB/Rehab People of the Year Awards
- 1988 Past Pupil of the Year Award, Terenure College, Dublin (Note: Terenure College lists the 1988 award winners as Michael Meighan which may be a variant spelling of "Meegan.")

== Publications ==
=== Books ===
- Elmore-Meegan, Michael & Julius Konttinen, May 2016, ICROSS, A Celebration in Images
- Elmore-Meegan, Michael & Colin Meagle. 2016. Tribe of One: A Guide to Personal Happiness, London: Eye Books; ISBN 978-1-903070-63-5/ISBN 978-1-903070-45-1
- Elmore-Meegan, Michael. 2016. 100 Ways to Change the World, London: Eye Books; ISBN 978-1-903070-45-1.
- Elmore-Meegan, Michael & Sharon Wilkinson. 2008. Take My Hand.
- Elmore-Meegan, Michael. 2007. Changing the World from the Inside Out: Connecting Your Intelligence, London: Eye Books.
- Elmore-Meegan, Michael. 2004. All Will Be Well London: Eye Books; ISBN 978-1-903070-27-7.
- Elmore-Meegan, Michael. 2006. Surprised by Joy: Out of the Darkness - Light, a Story of Hope in the Midst of Tragedy, Dunboyne, Ireland: Maverick House; ISBN 978-1-905379-05-7.
- Elmore-Meegan, Michael. 1986. All Shall Be Well: On Compassion and Love, London: Fount; ISBN 978-0-00-627006-5.

=== Articles ===
- Conroy, Ronan M.; Ligondo, Sophie; Hennessy, James; Elmore-Meegan, Michael; Soita, Allan; McGuigan, Kevin G. (2011). "Randomized Intervention Study of Solar Disinfection of Drinking Water in the Prevention of Dysentery in Kenyan Children Aged under 5 Years". Environmental Science & Technology. 45 (21): 9315–23. Bibcode:2011EnST...45.9315D. doi:10.1021/es2018835. PMID 21936492.
- Elmore-Meegan, Michael; Conroy, Ronán M.; Agala, C. Bernard (2004). "Sex workers in Kenya, numbers of clients and associated risks: an exploratory survey". Reproductive Health Matters. 12 (23): 50–57. doi:10.1016/S0968-8080(04)23125-1. PMID 15242210.
- Elmore-Meegan, Michael; Conroy, Ronán M.; Lengeny, Sarune Ole; Renhaul, Kate; Nyangole, J (2001). "Effect on neonatal tetanus mortality after a culturally-based health promotion programme". The Lancet. 358 (9282): 640–41. doi:10.1016/S0140-6736(01)05787-7. PMID 11530155. S2CID 41426401.
- Conroy, Ronán M.; Elmore-Meegan, Michael; Joyce, Tina M.; McGuigan, Kevin G.; Barnes, Joseph (2001). "Solar disinfection of drinking water protects against cholera in children under 6 years of age". Archives of Disease in Childhood. 85 (4): 293–95. doi:10.1136/adc.85.4.293. PMC 1718943. PMID 11567937.
- Conroy, Ronán M.; Elmore-Meegan, Michael; Joyce, Tina M.; McGuigan, Kevin G.; Barnes, Joseph (1999). "Solar disinfection of water reduces diarrhoeal disease: an update". Archives of Disease in Childhood. 81 (4): 337–38. doi:10.1136/adc.81.4.337. PMC 1718112. PMID 10490440.
- Meegan, Michael; Morley, David (1999). "Growth monitoring: family participation: effective community development". Tropical Doctor. 29 (1): 23–27. doi:10.1177/004947559902900109. PMID 10418276. S2CID 11411017.
- McGuigan, Kevin G.; Joyce, Tina M.; Conroy, Ronán M.; Gillespie, J.B.; Elmore-Meegan, Michael (1998). "Solar disinfection of drinking water contained in transparent plastic bottles: characterizing the bacterial inactivation process". Journal of Applied Microbiology. 84 (6): 1138–48. doi:10.1046/j.1365-2672.1998.00455.x. PMID 9717300.
- Elmore-Meegan, Michael; Morley, David; Chavasse, Desmond (1997). "Fly Traps". The Lancet. 349 (9055): 886. doi:10.1016/S0140-6736(05)61803-X. PMID 9121298.
- Conroy, Ronán M.; Elmore-Meegan, Michael; Joyce, Tina M.; McGuigan, Kevin G.; Barnes, Joseph (1996). "Solar disinfection of drinking water and diarrhoea in Maasai children: a controlled field trial". The Lancet. 348 (9043): 1695–97. doi:10.1016/S0140-6736(96)02309-4. PMID 8973432. S2CID 10341637.
- Joyce, Tina M.; McGuigan, Kevin G.; Elmore-Meegan, Michael; Conroy, Ronán M. (1996). "Inactivation of fecal bacteria in drinking water by solar heating". Applied and Environmental Microbiology. 62 (2): 399–402. Bibcode:1996ApEnM..62..399J. doi:10.1128/aem.62.2.399-402.1996. PMC 167810. PMID 8593045.
- Conroy, Ronán M.; Elmore-Meegan, Michael (1994). "Dwindling donor aid for health programmes in developing countries". The Lancet. 343 (8907): 1228–29. doi:10.1016/S0140-6736(94)92440-6. PMID 7909895. S2CID 26712214.
- Elmore-Meegan, Michael; Morley, Donald C.; Brown, R. (1994). "Child weighing by the unschooled: a report of a controlled study of growth monitoring over 12 months of Maasai children using direct recording scales". Transactions of the Royal Society of Tropical Medicine and Hygiene. 88 (6): 635–37. doi:10.1016/0035-9203(94)90202-x. PMID 7886753.
- McCormick, James; Elmore-Meegan, Michael (1992). "Maasai diet". The Lancet. 340 (8826): 1042–43. doi:10.1016/0140-6736(92)93060-Z. PMID 1357434. S2CID 31523997.
- Elmore-Meegan, Michael (1992). "Rethinking famine relief". The Lancet. 340 (8830): 1293–94. doi:10.1016/0140-6736(92)92998-U. PMID 1359352. S2CID 35576673.
- Konings, E.; Anderson, R. M.; Morley, Donald; O'Riordan, T.; Elmore-Meegan, M. (1989). "Rates of sexual partner change among two pastoralist southern Nilotic groups in east Africa". AIDS. 3 (4): 245–47. PMID 2500961.
- Elmore-Meegan, Michael; McCormick, James (1988). "Prevention of disease in the poor world". The Lancet. 332 (8603): 152–53. doi:10.1016/S0140-6736(88)90696-4. PMID 2899199. S2CID 44256673.
- Elmore-Meegan, Michael (1983). "Starvation and suffering". The Lancet. 322 (8365): 1506. doi:10.1016/S0140-6736(83)90857-7. PMID 6140600. S2CID 1927548.
- Elmore-Meegan, Michael (1981). "The reality of starvation and disease". The Lancet. 317 (8212): 146. doi:10.1016/S0140-6736(81)90722-4. PMID 6109812. S2CID 19151210.
