= Thomas Stock (MP) =

Thomas Stock MP

Member of Parliament for Carlow
- In office 15 July 1865 – 20 November 1868
- Preceded by: John Dalberg-Acton
- Succeeded by: William Fagan

Personal details
- Born: 1822
- Died: 17 November 1875 (aged 52–53)
- Party: Liberal

Thomas Osborne Stock (1822 – 17 November 1875) was an Irish Liberal politician.

He was elected as the Member of Parliament (MP) for Carlow at the 1865 general election but stood down at the 1868 general election.

Parliament of the United Kingdom
Preceded by John Dalberg-Acton	Member of Parliament for Carlow; 1865 – 1868	Succeeded by William Fagan
