= International Community for the Relief of Suffering and Starvation =

International Community for the Relief of Suffering and Starvation (ICROSS) is an international non-governmental organisation that provides health and development services for pastoral communities in East Africa.

The organisation was formerly known as CROSS between 1979 and 1982, standing for Community for the Relief of Suffering and Starvation. ICROSS, a Kenya-based international non-governmental organization, charity, and private voluntary organization founded by Dr. Michael Elmore-Meegan and Dr.Joseph Barnes. The organisation was formally established in Kenya, East Africa with the support of the Irish priests Paul Cunningham and John Hughes, both C.S.Sp. ICROSS specialises in a long term primary health, community healthcare and public health programmes. The organisation's headquarters are in Ngong, Rift Valley, Kenya. ICROSS has an established research programme ( for 40 years ) with a number of different partners and research collaborators.

According to the ICROSS Annual Report 2014, Dr. Elmore-Meegan is the International Director. ICROSS closed in Ireland in 2010. The Board of Directors includes: Sally Mukwana, Dr Allan Soita, Dr. Ngwiri Ndwaru, P. NgaNga, Edwin Chege, LLB, with Dr. E. Sequeira, Emeritus Chairman, Ex Officio Dr Elmore-Meegan.

== ICROSS areas of programming ==
ICROSS is as an International development NGO, registered under the Kenyan NGO act and regulated by the Kenyan Government, with a focus in the field of health, with key international lectures including the Red Future shocks lecture. ICROSS has most recently lectured at International conferences in the Nordic countries, Cambodia and Nepal.

ICROSS is responsible for a large terminal care programme and a series of public health programmes. One of ICROSS's key research streams has been investigating means of solar disinfection (SODIS) of contaminated drinking water, and has helped conduct a number of control trials of SODIS.

ICROSS stresses traditional tribal values, building development programmes through the existing decision systems and creating locally driven agendas. In 2015-16 the key areas of ICROSS programming are:

- Community-based primary health care
- Training traditional birth attendants, reduction of maternal deaths, gender rights awareness, commercial sex workers support, female circumcision harm reduction, safe motherhood education and girls.
- Poverty reduction
- Training health workers in desert areas, trachoma blindness control, diarrhoea control, tribal community health programmes, surgical training, desertification projects.
- Children's rights and gender and development
- Child-to-child sanitation and hygiene, pediatric disease control, child survival, immunisation, primary health care, infant mortality control, AIDS orphans and vulnerable children's rights, child health promotion.
- Community strengthening
- Disease surveillance, women group developments, technical support to small organisations, legal and material support, water and sanitation projects, ICROSS resource leverage, partnership development and networking.
- HIV/AIDS, TB and Malaria prevention
- Homecare of terminally ill, AIDS orphans and vulnerable children, TB awareness, detection and control, malaria control, maternal transmission education, voluntary counseling and testing, training in disease control.

== International profile ==
ICROSS campaigns since 1979 have included Africa awakes which tries to change the stereotypes and negative perceptions of Africa. These exhibitions have received wide media coverage in Italy and France. ICROSS public health work has been cited internationally, medical work has appeared in key scientific journals since 1981.

([Elmore-Meegan]), currently International Director, was featured in BBC's Hardtalk current affair's programme for his work for ICROSS while in 2006 the organisation was the subject of an award-winning documentary by Irish Television. ICROSS and its Founders have received widespread recognition for their work, especially in long term public health and creating lasting community development programmes.

In 2013 ICROSS extended its programmes internationally building on over three decades of disease control experience. It established a new Overseas Internship programme extending its 25-year history of Internship support. In May 2013 it extended its localisation strategy and began a radical low cost innovation plan with local tribal communities. In Fall 2014 ICROSS launched its radical Strategic plan 2015–20 that has seen dynamic changes in its Global direction. ICROSS work is widely cited and the administration is entirely Africanized since August 2000. The International Director Dr ([Michael Elmore-Meegan]), a specialist in International health, has supervised the Public health Research programme publishing in major Peer review journals since 1983. Together with Dr E Sequeira, Dr A. Soita and D.Ngwiri, ICROSS continues to implement long term public health innovations.

=== ICROSS Published Articles ===
- Conroy Ronan M., Ligondo Sophie, Hennessy James, Elmore-Meegan Michael, Soita Allan, McGuigan Kevin G. (2011). "Randomized Intervention Study of Solar Disinfection of Drinking Water in the Prevention of Dysentery in Kenyan Children Aged under 5 Years". Environmental Science & Technology. 45 (21): 9315–23. doi:10.1021/es2018835. PMID 21936492.
- Elmore-Meegan Michael, Conroy Ronán M., Agala C. Bernard (2004). "Sex workers in Kenya, numbers of clients and associated risks: an exploratory survey". Reproductive Health Matters. 12 (23): 50–57. doi:10.1016/S0968-8080(04)23125-1. PMID 15242210.
- Elmore-Meegan Michael, Conroy Ronán M., Lengeny Sarune Ole, Renhaul Kate, Nyangole J (2001). "Effect on neonatal tetanus mortality after a culturally-based health promotion programme". The Lancet. 358 (9282): 640–41. doi:10.1016/S0140-6736(01)05787-7. PMID 11530155.
- Conroy Ronán M., Elmore-Meegan Michael, Joyce Tina M., McGuigan Kevin G., Barnes Joseph (2001). "Solar disinfection of drinking water protects against cholera in children under 6 years of age". Archives of Disease in Childhood. 85 (4): 293–95. doi:10.1136/adc.85.4.293. PMC 1718943. PMID 11567937.
- Conroy Ronán M., Elmore-Meegan Michael, Joyce Tina M., McGuigan Kevin G., Barnes Joseph (1999). "Solar disinfection of water reduces diarrhoeal disease: an update". Archives of Disease in Childhood. 81 (4): 337–38. doi:10.1136/adc.81.4.337. PMC 1718112. PMID 10490440.
- Meegan Michael, Morley David (1999). "Growth monitoring: family participation: effective community development". Tropical Doctor. 29 (1): 23–27. doi:10.1177/004947559902900109. PMID 10418276.
- McGuigan Kevin G., Joyce Tina M., Conroy Ronán M., Gillespie J.B., Elmore-Meegan Michael (1998). "Solar disinfection of drinking water contained in transparent plastic bottles: characterizing the bacterial inactivation process". Journal of Applied Microbiology. 84 (6): 1138–48. doi:10.1046/j.1365-2672.1998.00455.x. PMID 9717300.
- Elmore-Meegan Michael, Morley David, Chavasse Desmond (1997). "Fly Traps". The Lancet. 349 (9055): 886. doi:10.1016/S0140-6736(05)61803-X. PMID 9121298.
- Conroy Ronán M., Elmore-Meegan Michael, Joyce Tina M., McGuigan Kevin G., Barnes Joseph (1996). "Solar disinfection of drinking water and diarrhoea in Maasai children: a controlled field trial". The Lancet. 348 (9043): 1695–97. doi:10.1016/S0140-6736(96)02309-4. PMID 8973432.
- Joyce Tina M., McGuigan Kevin G., Elmore-Meegan Michael, Conroy Ronán M. (1996). "Inactivation of fecal bacteria in drinking water by solar heating". Applied and Environmental Microbiology. 62 (2): 399–402. PMC 167810. PMID 8593045.
- Conroy Ronán M., Elmore-Meegan Michael (1994). "Dwindling donor aid for health programmes in developing countries". The Lancet. 343 (8907): 1228–29. doi:10.1016/S0140-6736(94)92440-6. PMID 7909895.
- Elmore-Meegan Michael, Morley Donald C., Brown R. (1994). "Child weighing by the unschooled: a report of a controlled study of growth monitoring over 12 months of Maasai children using direct recording scales". Transactions of the Royal Society of Tropical Medicine and Hygiene. 88 (6): 635–37. doi:10.1016/0035-9203(94)90202-x. PMID 7886753.
- McCormick James, Elmore-Meegan Michael (1992). "Maasai diet". The Lancet. 340 (8826): 1042–43. doi:10.1016/0140-6736(92)93060-Z. PMID 1357434.
- Elmore-Meegan Michael (1992). "Rethinking famine relief". The Lancet. 340 (8830): 1293–94. doi:10.1016/0140-6736(92)92998-U. PMID 1359352.
- Konings E., Anderson R. M., Morley Donald, O'Riordan T., Elmore-Meegan M. (1989). "Rates of sexual partner change among two pastoralist southern Nilotic groups in east Africa". AIDS. 3 (4): 245–47. PMID 2500961.
- Elmore-Meegan Michael, McCormick James (1988). "Prevention of disease in the poor world". The Lancet. 332 (8603): 152–53. doi:10.1016/S0140-6736(88)90696-4. PMID 2899199.
- Meegan Michael (1983). "Starvation and suffering". The Lancet. 322 (8365): 1506. doi:10.1016/S0140-6736(83)90857-7. PMID 6140600.
- Meegan Michael (1981). "The reality of starvation and disease". The Lancet. 317 (8212): 146. doi:10.1016/S0140-6736(81)90722-4. PMID 6109812.

== Controversy ==
Doubts were expressed about ICROSS Ireland financial accountability, resulting in an inquiry about how Irish Aid's money was being allocated. Key donors became unsatisfied with the organisation's financial probity. Finally, the Irish ICROSS (separate from the Kenyan ICROSS) was wound up in 2010 after returning E97,000 "omitted from its accounts" to Irish Aid. Meegan personally instituted court proceedings in Ireland, winning the last one in November 2012. ICROSS Kenya, the main Organisation remains fully compliant with the Kenyan Government NGO regulators (including and up to March 2017). In July 2019, ICROSS extended its Results based Management programmes and launched its new Awareness strategy as part of the new Five year Strategic plan 2020 - 2024 available on https://www.icrossinternational.org/
