= Nkalagu =

Nkalagu is a town in Ishielu Local Government Area of Ebonyi State, Nigeria. It is notable for having a large deposit of limestone which provided the raw material for the large cement plant of the Nigerian Cement Company (Nigercem). Nkalagu is the first town to be entered, when going into Ebonyi State through the Enugu-Abakaliki Expressway. It is the headquarters of Ishielu West Development Centre and has five major villages: Ishiagu, Uwule, Imeoha, Amanvu and Akiyi. The village head in Nkalagu is also known as Onyidzi. Each village has its own Onyidzi which must be the eldest son of the village patriarch, not necessarily the oldest male of the village because there are some visitors that later became part and parcel of the village...kindred/umunna. The major market is Nkwo Nkalagu which is located along the Enugu-Abakaliki Expressway.

== Origin of Nkalagu ==
Nkalagu was the second son of Odeke who migrated from Nkanu and settled around the present Amazu Town. Odeke gave birth to Amazu Odeke and Nkalagu Odeke the second son. Nkalagu was a hunter and traveled from place to place hunting. After hunting each day he usually went home to his father's house until he found the present place called Nkalagu. He settled there and sent message to his family that he had found a fertile place and would settle there with his family and would never come home again.

== Climate/Temperature ==
Nkalagu as part of Ebonyi state Nigeria has both dry Savannah and Tropical wet climate. The yearly Temperature of Nkalagu is 30.78 °C (87.4 °F),which is a little bit higher than Nigeria Normal average temperature. The annual Rainfall in this district is above 60% and that is 220 days above yearly. The season that is dry most in this Town is during the December month which is (6.02mm / 0.24in).And the cold month is during August which is (23.85 °C / 74.93 °F).
