= Medical Missionaries of Mary =

Religious institute of the Catholic Church

- Founder: Mother Mary of the Incarnation Martin, M.M.M.
- Founded at: Ireland
- Affiliations: Roman Catholic Church
- Website: https://mmmworldwide.org

The Medical Missionaries of Mary are a religious institute of the Catholic Church dedicated to providing health care to the underdeveloped regions of the world. They follow a Benedictine spirituality, with its focus on life in community, shared prayer and hospitality.

Founded in Ireland in 1937 by Mother Mary Martin, they were originally dedicated to serve the missions in Africa. Today they serve in both North and South America as well.

== History ==
=== Origins ===
Martin grew up in an affluent home raised by her mother after the premature death of her father. Upon the outbreak of the First World War, Martin joined the Voluntary Aid Detachment, a division of the Red Cross, and helped with the nursing of wounded soldiers. After completing her period of service, she returned home to Ireland. There, she was inspired by the Reverend Thomas Roynane, a new curate assigned to her parish, to serve as a missionary in China as part of the proposed new religious congregation of the Missionary Sisters of St. Columban. In the meanwhile, she was called upon to help in nursing victims of the Spanish flu, which had begun to devastate populations around the world. To prepare for her missionary service, she went to England in January 1919 for further medical training. She was scheduled to undertake training in midwifery the following year. Her mother's severe illness prevented her from taking that training, however, as she had to return home to care for her.

By chance, Joseph Shanahan, C.S.Sp., a member of the missionary Holy Ghost Fathers, had just been named Vicar Apostolic for the new Vicariate Apostolic of Southern Nigeria, then still a British colony. He received permission to recruit among the secular clergy to serve there on contracts of five-years duration. Roynane received permission from his own bishop to volunteer for this work.

In April 1920, Roynane arranged for Martin to meet the new bishop, and she volunteered her services as a lay missionary to work in his jurisdiction. She advised him that she was about to commence training as a midwife. Agnes Ryan, another initial candidate for the Columban Sisters and by now in her fourth year of medical training, advised Martin that she wished to join her in the African mission. She completed that training in February 1921.

=== Africa ===
In April of that same year, Martin left Ireland for Nigeria, with Ryan, who had left her studies. They set sail for Africa from Liverpool on 25 May on the S.S. Elmina, a ship of the African Steamship Company. They arrived in the port of Calabar on 14 June. They arrived prepared to provide medical care, only to learn that they were expected to run a school which had been staffed by French Religious Sisters until two years prior. To give the parents and children of the school a sense of continuity, the two women were addressed as "Sisters" by the priests and treated as if they were already members of an established religious congregation.

By October, Ryan had contracted malaria and developed a heart condition, which required her return to Ireland. Forced to fill in as Acting Headmistress, Martin determined to confer directly with the bishop in his headquarters at Onitsha, a journey of 100 miles (160 kilometers), for which she brought along three of the oldest girls at the school. Meeting with the bishop, Martin was advised that caution was needed in providing medical care to the people of her mission, so as not to provoke objections by other missionaries in the region. Further, before leaving Ireland, the bishop had organized a support group of Catholic mothers to provide assistance to the missions, of which Martin's own mother had become the president. They agreed that a religious congregation was needed to meet the needs of the mission. Upon her return to Calabar, Martin made a 30-day-long retreat following the Spiritual Exercises of Ignatius of Loyola, in an effort to clarify where she was being led.

In April 1922 the bishop traveled there and held two weeks of consultations with Martin, Roynane and another missioner, during which the Rule and Constitutions of a new congregation were hammered out, with the understanding that Martin would be the foundress. Martin was not to see the bishop again for two years. During this time she learned that the bishop was working to establish the new congregation in Ireland, a direction she felt would focus the congregation on teaching rather than the medical care to which she felt called. An Irish Sister of Charity, Sister Magdalen Walker, was released from her congregation to help in this new work. She arrived in Calabar in October 1923. The following January Martin was directed by the bishop to return to Ireland to make a novitiate period which would be recognized under new Church law. In March she joined Agnes Ryan, another volunteer at the mission, Elizabeth Ryan, and an American candidate, Veronica Hasson, as they started their time of postulancy, prior to admission to the novitiate year. After 18 months, however, upon completion of the novitiate year she left the community, as the training provided by the Dominican Sisters providing their formation had not been oriented toward medical care.

=== New paths ===
In this formal step of forming the new congregation, Martin had encountered the prohibition in the new Code of Canon Law of 1917 of the Catholic Church against members of religious orders practicing medicine. Facing this barrier, Martin still felt a call to consecrated life and considered following the example of the recently canonized Carmelite nun, Thérèse of Lisieux (coincidentally also bearing the family name of Martin). In 1927 she applied to the monastery of that Order in Dublin, but her application was declined, solely on the decision of the prioress who overrode a unanimous vote by community, feeling that Martin was called to a different path in life. She then went through a new period of confusion until she was requested to consider again serving the missions. She then formed a small group of women to provide the domestic service for the preparatory school run by the Benedictine monks of Glenstal Abbey.

Following a long period of illness in 1932, the following year Martin approached the new Apostolic Nuncio to Ireland, Archbishop Paschal Robinson, O.F.M. The nuncio was supportive of her goals and encouraged her continually over the next years. Finally, in February 1936, the Holy See lifted prohibition against Religious Sisters serving as doctors or midwives. Martin then sought a diocese which would accept a new congregation, without success. In October of that same year, Robinson's former secretary, Antonio Riberi, was named Apostolic Delegate in Africa, based in Kenya. He gave his support to having the congregation established in Calabar, which at that time was under a new Vicar Apostolic, James Moynagh, S.P.S., whose own sister Sr. Mary Joseph Moynagh, was a member of the new community eventually serving as the fourth superior of the congregation.

=== Foundation ===
While still negotiating to purchase a house in Ireland to serve as a local base there—which complicated by the fact that they were not yet a formal congregation—the small community sailed for Nigeria at the end of 1936. Upon their arrival Martin suffered a heart attack and was hospitalized at Port Harcourt. It was there that she was allowed to profess religious vows on 4 April 1937. With that the Medical Missionaries of Mary became formally established as a congregation.

== Current status ==
=== Religious Sisters ===
Today the Medical Missionaries of Mary number some 400 women from 20 countries, who serve in 14 different countries around the world. These are: Ireland, England, Angola, Benin, Kenya, Malawi, Nigeria, Rwanda, South Sudan, Tanzania, Uganda, Brazil, Honduras, Taiwan Taitung and the United States. The Sisters are trained in a variety of health-related professions. Their special concern is the care of the medical needs of mothers and children and the fostering of family life.

=== Associate members ===
As well as sisters with lifelong religious vows, there are about 100 associate members, both men and women, who feel drawn to the spirituality of the congregation and to apply its values in their daily lives, making an annual covenant to live it out in their daily lives. MMM associates can be found in 12 different countries.

== Bibliography ==
- Deidre M. Bryan, A 'Peculiarly Fitting Institute': The Origins of the Marie Martin's Medical Missionaries of Mary, Ph.D dissertation, Boston University, December, 2007
- E.M. Dailor, "A History of Development of Medical Missions and Catholic Evangelization in Sub-Saharan Africa From the Early Twentieth Century to the Present: Tracing Some Representative Founders and Orders in the Context of the Twentieth Century Church", Linacre Quarterly, 88(4), 2021, pp.381-390. doi: 10.1177/00243639211024578.
