= Mary Martin (missionary) =

Irish Catholic missionary

Mother Mary of the Incarnation Martin, M.M.M. (24 April 1892 – 1975) was the Irish foundress of the Catholic religious institute of the Medical Missionaries of Mary.

== Early life ==
She was born Marion Helena Martin in Glenageary, County Dublin, Ireland, then part of the United Kingdom of Great Britain and Ireland, on 24 April 1892, the second of the twelve children her parents Thomas Martin and Mary Moore were to have. In 1904, while attending classes for her First Holy Communion, Martin contracted rheumatic fever, which was to affect her heart permanently. Tragedy hit the family on St. Patrick's Day 1907, as her father was killed in what was presumed to be an accidental shooting. Later her mother sent her to schools in Scotland, England and Germany, all of which she left as quickly as possible.

Upon the outbreak of the First World War, Martin joined the Voluntary Aid Detachment, a division of the Red Cross, and helped with the nursing of wounded soldiers brought back from the front. Her own brother, Charles, was soon sent to fight in the campaign of Gallipoli. In October 1915, she was assigned to work in Malta. Here she helped there for the thousands of soldiers being brought back from that battle. Learning that her brother had been declared missing in action, she sought to gain information about his fate from the returning soldiers. Learning little of use added to her stress and she began to long to return home. The family finally learned that Charlie had been killed in the conflict, dying of wounds received at the battle. She returned to Ireland in April 1916. While she was at sea, the Easter Uprising took place in Dublin, which was to lead to the establishment of the Republic of Ireland.

Martin was called to serve again a month later at Hardelot, France, in a field hospital near the front lines of the Battle of the Somme. There she cared for soldiers suffering from gas poisoning. This assignment lasted until December of that year, followed by a brief stint in Leeds, England. All this time, she tried to discern her future. Shortly after the end of the War, she was called up to help nursing victims of the Spanish flu, which had begun to devastate populations around the world.

In 1917, a new curate came to the parish which Martin attended, the Reverend Thomas Roynane, to whom she turned for guidance. Roynane had an interest in missionary work, bringing together two fellow members of the clergy who were going to and found the Missionary Society of St. Columban. They soon conceived of the idea of a congregation of Religious Sisters to provide medical care in the missions of China to which they had planned to go. Roynane recruited two women to commit themselves to this work, Lady Frances Moloney and Agnes Ryan, a local schoolteacher.

== Training for the missions ==
Roynane had also inspired Martin with an interest in pursuing this calling. To this end, she went to England in January 1919 for further medical training. She was scheduled to undertake training in midwifery the following year. Her mother's severe illness prevented her from taking that training, however, as she had to return home to care for her. By chance, Joseph Shanahan, C.S.Sp., an Irish member of the missionary Holy Ghost Fathers, had just been named Vicar Apostolic for southern Nigeria, then still a British colony. He received permission to recruit among the secular clergy to serve there on contracts of five-years duration. Roynane received permission from his own bishop to volunteer for this work.

In April 1920, Roynane arranged for Martin to meet the new bishop, and she volunteered her services as a lay missionary to work in his jurisdiction. She advised him that she was about to start training as a midwife. Ryan, by now in her fourth year of medical training, advised her that she wished to join her in the African mission. She completed that training in February 1921.

== Service in Africa ==
In April of that same year, Martin left Ireland for Nigeria, with Ryan, who had left her studies. They set sail for Africa from Liverpool on 25 May on the S.S. Elmina, a ship of the African Steamship Company. They arrived in the port of Calabar on 14 June. They arrived prepared to provide medical care, only to learn that they were expected to run a school which had been staffed by French Religious Sisters until two years prior. To give the parents and children of the school a sense of continuity, the two women were addressed as "Sisters" by the priests and treated as if they were already members of an established religious institute.

By October, Ryan had contracted malaria and developed a heart condition, which required her to return to Ireland. Forced to fill in as Acting Headmistress, Martin determined to confer directly with the bishop in his headquarters at Onitsha, a journey of 100 miles (160 kilometres), for which she brought along three of the oldest girls at the school. Meeting with the bishop, Martin was advised that caution was needed in providing medical care to the people of her mission, so as not to provoke objections by other missionaries in the region. Further, before leaving Ireland, the bishop had organized a support group of Catholic mothers to provide assistance to the missions, of which Martin's own mother had become the president. They agreed that a religious congregation was needed to meet the needs of the mission. Upon her return to Calabar, Martin made a 30-day retreat.

In April 1922, the bishop travelled there and held two weeks of consultations with Martin, Roynane and another missioner, during which the Rule and Constitutions of a new congregation were hammered out, with the understanding that Martin would be the foundress. Martin was not to see the bishop again for two years. During this time she learned that the bishop was working to establish the new congregation in Ireland, a direction she felt would focus the congregation on teaching rather than the medical care to which she felt called. An Irish Sister of Charity, Sister Magdalen Walker, was released from her congregation to help in this new work. She arrived in Calabar in October 1923. The following January Martin was directed by the bishop to return to Ireland to make a canonical novitiate. In March she joined Agnes Ryan, another volunteer at the mission, Elizabeth Ryan, and an American candidate, Veronica Hasson, as they started their time of postulancy, prior to admission to the novitiate year. After 18 months, however, upon completion of the novitiate year, she left the community as the training provided by the Dominican Sisters providing their formation had not been oriented toward medical care.

== New paths ==
In this formal step of forming the new congregation, Martin encountered the prohibition in the new Code of Canon Law of 1917 of the Catholic Church against members of religious orders practising medicine. Facing this barrier, Martin still felt a call to consecrated life and considered following the example of the recently canonized Carmelite nun, Thérèse of Lisieux (coincidentally also bearing the family name of Martin). In 1927 she applied to the community of that Order in Dublin, but her application was declined, solely on the decision of the prioress who overrode a unanimous vote by community, feeling that Martin was called to a different path in life. She then went through a new period of confusion until she was requested to consider again serving the missions. She then formed a small group of women to provide the domestic service for the preparatory school run by the Benedictine monks Glenstal Abbey.

Following a long period of illness in 1932, the following year Martin approached the new Apostolic Nuncio to Ireland, Archbishop Paschal Robinson, O.F.M. The nuncio was supportive of her goals and encouraged her continually over the next years. Finally, in February 1936, the Holy See lifted the prohibition against Religious Sisters serving as doctors or midwives. Martin then sought a diocese which would accept a new congregation, without success. In October of that same year, Robinson's former secretary, Antonio Riberi, was named Apostolic Delegate in Africa, based in Kenya. He gave his support to having the congregation established in Calabar, which at that time was under a new Vicar Apostolic, James Moynagh, S.P.S., whose own sister was a member of the new community.

== Foundation ==
While still negotiating to purchase a house in Ireland as a local base, complicated by the fact that they were not yet a formal congregation, the small community sailed for Nigeria at the end of 1936. Upon their arrival, Martin suffered a heart attack and was hospitalized at Port Harcourt. It was there that she professed religious vows on 4 April 1937. With that, the Medical Missionaries of Mary became established.

== Legacy ==
Martin's health was always a source of concern but she lived until 1975. Today the Medical Missionaries of Mary number some 400 women from 16 different nations, who serve in 14 different countries around the world.

== Sources ==
- "Our Foundress" in the Medical Missionaries of Mary international website (archived 20 December 2012)
